= List of instant noodle brands =

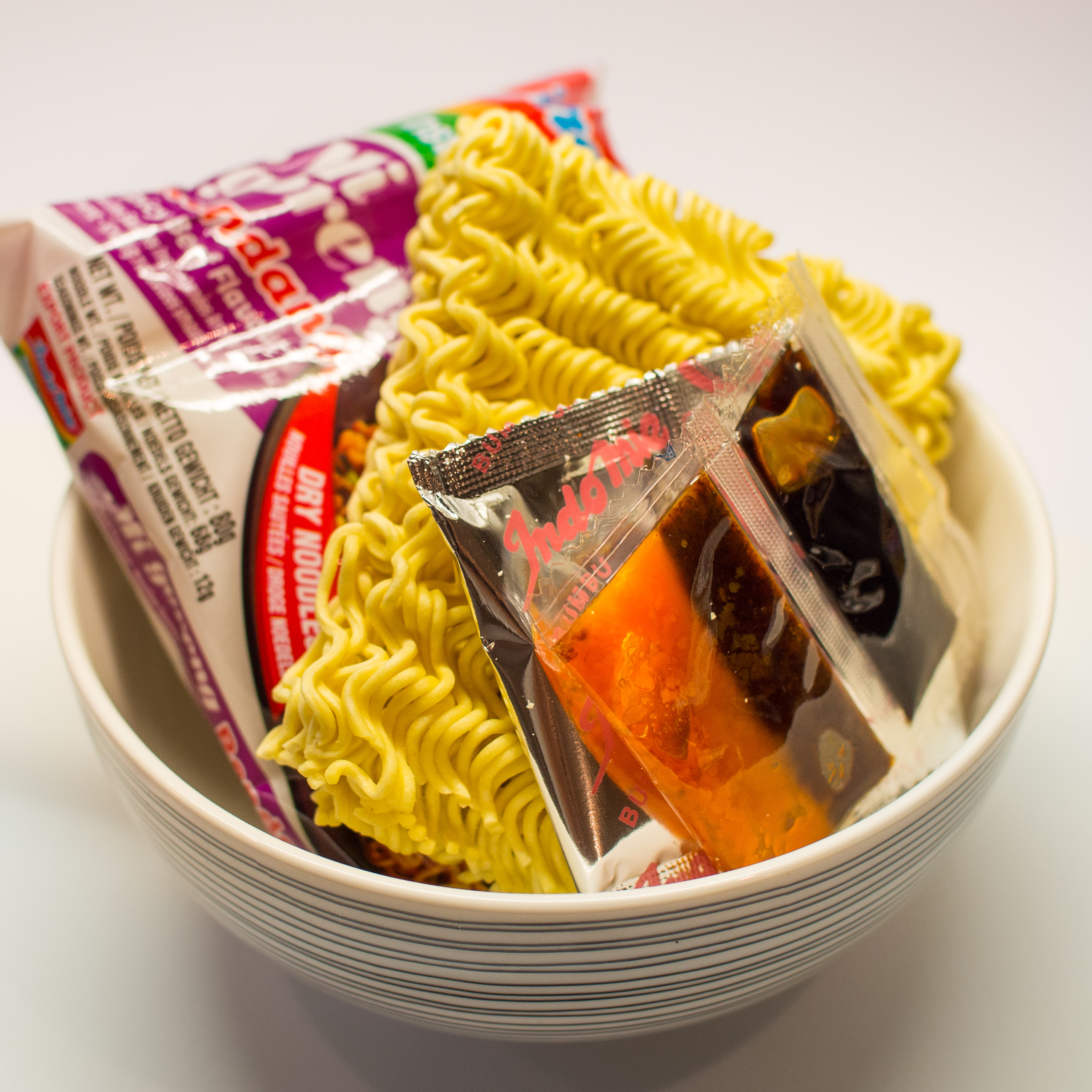
Close-up of Rendang Flavoured Indomie Noodles

This is a list of instant noodle brands. Instant noodles are a dried or precooked noodle block, usually sold with a packet of flavoring powder and/or seasoning oil. Dried noodles are usually eaten after being cooked or soaked in boiling water, while precooked noodles can be reheated or eaten straight from the packet/cup. The instant noodle was invented by Momofuku Ando of Nissin Foods in Japan. They were launched in 1958 under the brand name Chikin Ramen.

== Instant noodle brands ==
Name	Picture	Current owner	Description
Acecook		Acecook (エースコック)	Founded in 1948 and incorporated in 1954 in Osaka, Japan with subsidiaries in S.E. Asia, one of which is the largest instant noodle brand in Vietnam.
Ajinomen		Ajinomoto del Perú S.A.	Brand in Peru.
Amino		Unilever	Brand of instant noodles, ready-to-eat meals, and sauces. Founded in the 1970s and produced in Poland. The brand is now owned by Unilever.
Annie Chun's		CJ CheilJedang	
Ansungtangmyun		Nongshim	Brand of ramyeon produced in South Korea since 1983, and is the third highest-selling brand of noodles in South Korea as of 2014.
A-Sha Noodles		Asha Foods	Brand in Taiwan. A cult favorite in Taiwan for its dry noodles, A-Sha came to international attention in 2020 for being Duncan Robinson's favorite quick and fast meal. Some of A-Sha's most popular sauces include original and spicy soy, sesame scallion, and mala chili.
Bakmi Mewah		Mayora Indah	Asian-style noodle brand in Indonesia.
Buitoni Instant Noodles		Buitoni	Italian brand owned by Nestlé, now sold under the name Maggi Noodles.
Buldak Bokkeum Myun		Samyang Foods	Produced in South Korea since 2012, and also sold overseas, Buldak Bokkeum Myun is known for being one of the spiciest ramyeon brands in Korea.
Cham-ggae Ramyeon		Ottogi	A type of ramyeon sold in South Korea, the contents of the ramyeon are unique; it consists of a dried noodle block, seasoning, oil, sesame, and an "egg block" of egg and vegetables. It is served both in a cup and a "bag."
Chapagetti		Nongshim	Produced in South Korea since 1984. Chapagetti is the first instant Jajangmyeon in South Korea and is the second highest-selling brand of noodles in South Korea.
Chicken Ramen		Nissin Foods	Instant noodles were invented by Taiwanese-Japanese inventor Momofuku Ando in Japan, and his invention was first marketed on 25 August 1958 by Ando's company, Nissin, under the brand name Chikin Ramen. Also referred to as Nissin Chikin Ramen, it remains popular in Japan.
Ching's Secret		Capital Foods	An Indian brand of Indian Chinese cuisine ingredients, condiments and ready to eat meals. Ching's Secret is owned by the corporation Capital Foods.
Cup Noodles		Nissin Foods	Instant ramen, and the first to be exported from Japan, by Nissin Foods starting in 1971, bearing the name "Oodles of Noodles". One year later, it was re-branded "Nissin Cup Noodles" and packaged in a foam food container. Currently the largest instant noodle brand in Japan and sold in around 80 countries. Branded in China as Hé wèi dào, with the "Homestyle" brand also sold in the United States.
Demae Iccho		Nissin Foods	Demae Ramen or Demae Itcho was first introduced in Japan in 1969 and entered the market in Hong Kong the following year. As of 2016, it has the market share of approximately 60% of ramen, with "original Japanese style" and other flavors catered for the region.
Dosirac		Korea Yakult (Paldo)	A brand of ramyeon produced in South Korea since 1986. It has also become a popular brand in Russia.
Foodles		Haleon	Introduced in 2010 in India under the banner of GSK. The company separated its consumer division to form the independent brand, Haleon, in 2022.
Hot Chicken Flavor Ramen		Samyang Foods	Brand in South Korea.
Ho-Mi		Uni-President Philippines Corporation	Brand in the Philippines.
Imperial Big Meal ("滿漢大餐")		Uni-President Enterprises Corporation	Brand in Taiwan. Famous for its beef noodle soup line, Imperial Big Meal is one of the most popular instant noodles in Taiwan and boasts some actual chunks of meat in its sauce packet.
Indomie		Indofood	Brand by Indofood in Indonesia. Indomie has become the largest instant noodle producer in Indonesia. It has the largest market share in Southeast Asia and Nigeria. Indomie is sold in countries like Hong Kong, Taiwan, India, Australia, New Zealand, Nigeria, Turkey, Saudi Arabia, European countries, the United States, and Canada. In 2016, Kantal Worldpanel listed Indomie at the 8th spot on the list of most purchased brands in the world.
Intermi		Indofood Sukses Makmur	Brand by Indofood in Indonesia. Previously owned and produced by PT Pandu Djaya Abadi.
Jin Ramen		Ottogi	Brand in South Korea.
Kang Shi Fu		Master Kong	Brand in China.
KiKi Noodles		KiKi Fine Goods	Brand in Taiwan.
Knorr Instant Noodles, Asian Noodles, Cabuk Noodle, Snack Pot, Nudle		Unilever	Various flavours manufactured in Asia (India, Pakistan), Europe (Poland).
Koka Instant Noodles		Tat Hui Foods	Manufactured in Singapore, sold domestically and internationally.
La Choy Chow Mein Noodles		La Choy	Brand in the United States.
Lemonilo		Lemonilo	A healthy instant noodle brand from Indonesia established in 2016. The noodles have green color from the juice of spinach.
Lucky Me!		Monde Nissin	Lucky Me! is a Filipino brand that initially featured dry stir-fried noodles, and later expanded to making instant mami and other instant Filipino noodle dishes. As of 2020, it became the most popular instant noodle brand in the Philippines.
Maggi		Nestlé	Maggi instant noodles are popular in Bangladesh, Pakistan, Singapore, Malaysia, South Africa, Australia, New Zealand, and India. Nestle has 39% market share in Malaysia and 60% in India as of 2018.
Maggi Cuppa Mania		Nestlé	
MAMA		Thai President Foods	Thai President Foods is based in Bangkok since 1972. It is very famous in Thailand and its surrounding countries like Burma, Vietnam, Cambodia and Malaysia and others outside of South East Asia. It has also recently been awarded the 2019 Sustainability Disclosure Acknowledgement, 2019 Saha Group Innovation Contest, among others.
Mamee Chef		Mamee Double-Decker	MAMEE Chef is a brand in Malaysia.
Maruchan		Toyo Suisan	
Migelas		Mayora Indah	Brand in Indonesia.
Mie Oven		Mayora Indah	Pasta brand in Indonesia.
Mie Sedaap		Wings Food	Brand in Indonesia.
Mr. Noodles		Anderson Watts Limited	Imported by Anderson Watts Ltd. (Burnaby, BC, Canada) and made in China by Beltek Foods; manufactured by Beltek (Huizhou) Foods Co., Ltd. (Huizhou, Guangdong, China).
Neoguri		Nongshim	A brand of ramyeon produced in South Korea since 1982. It is exported to over 80 different countries, and is the fourth highest selling brand of noodles in South Korea.
Nissin Noodles		Nissin Foods	Brand sold in Kenya.
Paldo Bibim Men		Korea Yakult (Paldo)	A brand of brothless ramyeon (ramen) with sweet and spicy seasoning sauce to mix with noodles, produced since 1984. It is the oldest brothless ramyeon in Korea. In 2013, Paldo Bibim Men was the tenth-ranked for ramyeon sales in South Korea, with revenues of 47 billion won that year.
Patanjali Atta Noodles		Patanjali Ayurved	An Indian brand of Instant noodles made from wheat.
Payless		Universal Robina	Brand in the Philippines.
Pop Mie		Indofood	A popular brand of instant cup noodles by Indofood in Indonesia.
Pot Noodle		Unilever	
Prima Taste		Prima Food	Prima Taste instant noodles are a premium brand of noodles.
Prince Noodles ("小王子麵")		Ve Wong Corporation	Brand in Taiwan.
Quickchow		Zest-O Corporation	The second-generation instant noodle brand in the Philippines.
Rara Noodle		Gandaki Noodles (P.) Ltd.	Manufactured in Nepal since 1980.
Rollton		Mareven Food Central	Founded in 1999. A popular brand in Russia.
Saikebon		Star (company) (owned by Spanish company Gallina Blanca, now GBfoods).	A brand popular in Italy ("saikebon" is a word joke, it is Japanese-sounding, but it actually means "Sai che buono?" [Do you know it is so good?]).
Sakura		Indofood Sukses Makmur	Brand by Indofood in Indonesia.
Samyang ramen		Samyang Foods	Brand from South Korea.
Sapporo Ichiban		Sanyo Foods (サンヨー食品)	A brand of instant noodles with varieties such as ramen and instant yakisoba, Sapporo Ichiban has found a market outside its origin in Japan, most notably with consumers in Hong Kong, the United States, Mexico, Argentina and Canada.
Sarimi		Indofood Sukses Makmur	Brand by Indofood in Indonesia.
Science Noodles ("科學麵")		Uni-President Enterprises Corporation	Brand in Taiwan.
Shin Ramyun		Nongshim	A brand of instant noodle (including cup ramyeon) that is produced in South Korean since October, 1986. It is now exported to over 100 countries, and is the highest selling instant noodle brand in South Korea. Shin Ramyun is well known for its spicy flavor. It is produced in two kinds: Shin Ramyun, the original one, and Shin Ramyun Black.
Shoop Instant Noodles		Shan Foods	Manufactured in Pakistan since 2012.
Smith & Jones instant noodles		Capital Foods Ltd, India	Brand of instant noodles manufactured in India for domestic distribution and export.
Super Noodles		Premier Foods	
Tekki Shomen		Zest-O Corporation	Brand sold in the Philippines.
Tekki Yakiudon		Zest-O Corporation	Brand sold in the Philippines.
Tong Yi (统一) (Uni-President)		Uni-President Enterprises Corporation	Brand in Taiwan.
Top Ramen		Nissin Foods	Sold in the United States starting in 1972, in Nissin's first foray overseas.
TTL Hua Tiao Chicken Noodles		Taiwan Tobacco and Liquor Corporation	Brand in Taiwan.
Vifon		Vietnam Food Industries Joint Stock Company	Large instant noodle brand in Vietnam, speciality product are instant rice noodles and instant pho.
Wai Wai		Thai Preserved Food Factory, Co., Ltd., Chaudhary Group	Manufactured in Thailand since 1972 and in Nepal since 1984.
Wei Lih Men ("維力")		Wei Lih Food Industrial Co., Ltd.	Manufactured in Taiwan since 1973.

== By country ==
Instant noodles are a popular food in many parts of the world, undergoing changes in flavor to fit local tastes. In 2018, the World Instant Noodles Association (WINA) reported that 103,620 million servings were consumed worldwide. China (and Hong Kong) consumed 40,250 million servings and Indonesia consumed 12,540 million, the three areas dominating world instant noodle consumption. South Korea tops the world in per capita consumption at 75 servings per year. It is followed by Vietnam at 54 servings, and Nepal at 53.

=== Australia ===
The most popular manufacturer of instant noodles in Australia is San Remo Macaroni Company, whose Fantastic and Suimin brands hold a 30% market share. Other brands include Indomie, Indomie Mi Goreng, Maggi, Mr Lee's Noodles, Wai Wai, Nissin's Demae Ramen, and Nongshim's Shin Ramyun. Instant noodles are often referred to as "two-minute noodles" in Australia, a reflection of their preparation time.

=== China ===
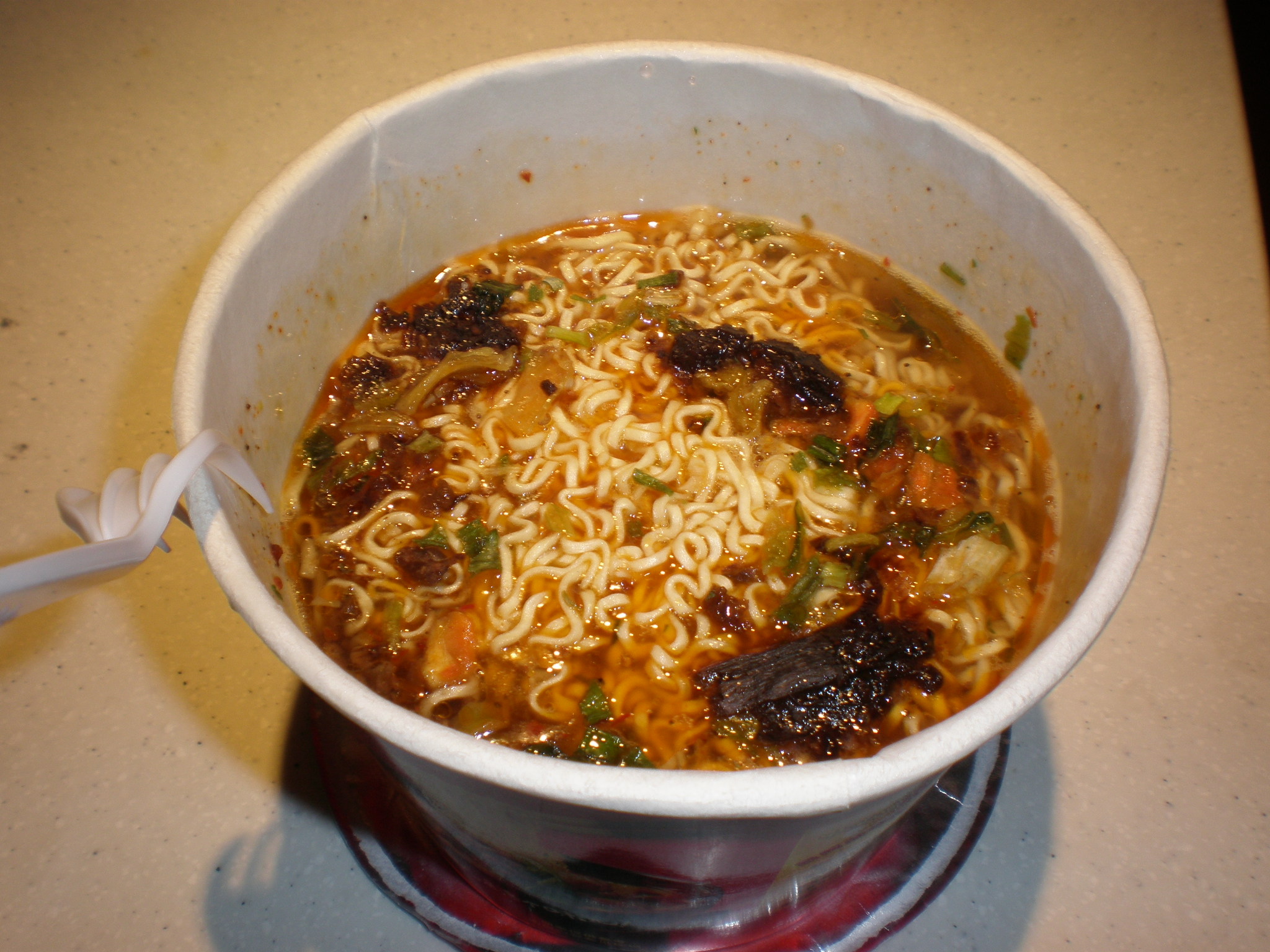
A cup of cooked roasted beef instant noodle sold in Shenzhen, China

According to industry trade group World Instant Noodles Association, China is the world's largest instant noodle market, with demand reaching 40.25 billion servings in 2018.

=== Colombia ===
Instant noodles were introduced to Colombia in 2010 by Nissin Foods. On 13 September 2013, Nissin Foods opened its commercial office in Bogotá, investing US$ 6 million in its corporate offices.

=== Hong Kong ===
Cantonese people have a long history of cooking yi mein, a noodle invented in the Qing Dynasty. However, modern instant noodles were only publicly introduced to Hong Kong in the late 1960s by Winner Food Products Ltd. as "Doll Noodles" (Chinese: 公仔麵). Although the company was bought out by Nissin in 1984, and other brands from many different countries have become widely available, the name "Doll Noodles" remains ubiquitous and has since become a synonym for instant noodles, irrespective of brands.

Most supermarkets offer a broad selection of both domestic and international brands, including Shin Ramyun of South Korea, Nissin Chikin and Demae Itcho of Japan, Indomie of Indonesia, Koka of Singapore, and Mama of Thailand. Besides instant wheat noodles, supermarkets also sell instant rice noodles and Cantonese egg noodles.

Some noodles are also marketed as a snack that does not need to be cooked; consumers eat the noodles directly out of the packaging, similar to crisps.

=== Hungary ===
Hungary is 43rd in the world in consumption of instant noodles, according to the World Instant Noodles Association (WINA), having consumed 20 million packages/cups of noodles in 2014.

Thai President Foods, manufacturer of MAMA noodles, opened an instant noodles factory in Hungary in 2013. The Hungarian factory's two production lines have a capacity of 4.5 million noodle packs per shift per month. It produces "Thai Chef" and "Asia Gold" brand noodles for the European market.

=== India ===
According to World Instant Noodles Association (WINA), in 2018, India was the third largest consumer of instant noodles after China/Hong Kong and Indonesia. This segment had total sales of $1,040.4 million in 2019 and is predicted to grow at a CAGR of around 5.6 per cent to $1,293.7 million in 2023.

On 5 June 2015, the Food Safety and Standards Authority of India (FSSAI) banned all nine approved variants of Maggi instant noodles from India, terming them "unsafe and hazardous" for human consumption.

As per FSSAI, Nestlé had launched the products without completing the process of risk assessment, and Nestlé committed three violations:

1. The presence of lead detected in Maggi Noodles was in excess of the maximum permissible levels of 2.5 ppm
2. Misleading labeling information on the package reading "No added MSG"
3. Releasing of a non-standardized food product in the market, "Maggi Oats Masala Noodles with Tastemaker", without risk assessment and grant of product approval

Despite a six-month ban on Maggi in 2015 for high monosodium glutamate (MSG) and lead content, Nestlé India regained strength and rallied 149 percent from lows of Rs 5,011 per share hit in March 2016.

India is Nestlé Maggi's largest market. Other brands of instant noodles in the country include Patanjali Ayurved, Ching's Secret, Knorr, Sunfeast Yippee,Too Yum,Haldiram,Top Ramen, Indomie, Joymee, Nissin, Maruchan, Horlicks, Wai Wai, Yumiraa Instant Noodle and several domestic and regional names. Many brands from East and Southeast Asia, such as Koka, Picnic, Nongshim, Samyang, Jin Ramen, and Yum Yum also started flooding the Indian market after various free-trade agreements.

=== Indonesia ===
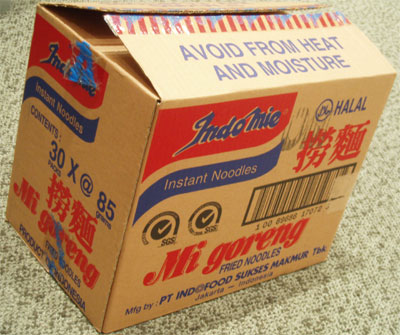
A box of Indomie Mie goreng

According to WINA, Indonesia is the world's second largest instant noodle market after China, with demand reaching 12.54 billion servings in 2018.

An early instant noodle brand in Indonesia was "Supermi", introduced in 1969 by PT Lima Satu Sankyo (later renamed PT Super Mi Indonesia in 1977 and PT Lambang Insan Makmur in 1989). After the success of Supermi, other instant noodle brands appeared: "Indomie", introduced in 1972 by PT Sanmaru Food Manufacturing Co. Ltd., and "Sarimi", introduced in 1982 by PT Sarimi Asli Jaya. In 1994, these brands (as well as factories) were merged into Indofood Sukses Makmur, one of the largest instant noodle producer in the world.

At least twenty instant noodle companies compete in the Indonesian market, with Indofood, Wings Group, Olagafood, ABC Holding, Jakarana Tama (Gaga and Arirang), Mayora, Lemonilo (Unifam), Tiptop, and Suprama thriving in the top nine. In 1999, the figure was about 90%; their market share declined following the introduction of "Mie Sedaap" by Wings Food in 2003. Strong local preferences contribute to the low volume of sales of Japanese and other foreign instant noodles in Indonesia.

Popular instant noodle flavours in Indonesia include chicken curry, onion and chicken, bakso (beef meatball), mie goreng, and chicken soto, a traditional Indonesian chicken soup. In the past, Indomie tried to produce thirty different flavours to reflect various traditional dishes of Indonesian cuisine, but the product line was discontinued after disappointing results, with only a few variants remaining in production. Indonesians usually add ingredients such as boiled Chinese green cabbage, boiled or fried eggs, corned beef, bottled sambal chili sauce, pepper, or fried shallots to their meals.

Most of the market share is owned by the product Indomie Mi goreng, a dry instant noodle meant to replicate traditional Indonesian mie goreng, or fried noodles. In November 2019, LA Times named Indomie Barbecue Chicken flavour and Indomie Mi Goreng as among the best-tasting ramen in the world.

Although originally targeted at families eating at home, nowadays instant noodles are also served in warung (simple shops). These shops serving instant noodles are customarily called warung indomie or warmindo, despite the fact that the brands of instant noodles served there are not necessarily Indomie.

=== Japan ===
Japan is the country of origin of instant noodles, and the dish remains a "national" light food. The average Japanese person eats forty packs of instant noodles per year.

After their invention by Momofuku Andō in 1958, instant noodles became very common in Japan. In the 1970s, makers expanded their flavors to include such examples as shio (salt), miso, or curry. Beginning in the 1980s, manufacturers also added dried toppings such as shrimp, pork, or eggs. Today, instant noodles are divided into two groups: "traditional" cheap (¥70 to ¥200) noodles with few toppings and expensive (¥150 to ¥350) noodles with many toppings, which are often packed into a pouch. Various kinds of instant noodles are produced, including ramen, udon, soba, yakisoba, and pasta.

Major instant noodle brands in Japan include:

- Nissin Foods 日清食品, whose products include "Chicken Ramen" and "Cup Noodles". The brand has a 40.4% market share as of 2005.
- Tōyō Suisan 東洋水産, under the brand name Maruchan, whose products include "Akai Kitsune" and "Midori no Tanuki"; 19.2% market share.
- Sanyō Foods サンヨー食品; "Sapporo Ichiban"; 11.5% market share.
- Myōjō Foods 明星食品, Charumera, has a 9.9% market share.
- Acecook エースコック; "Super Cup"; 8.3% market share.

=== South Korea ===
Ramyeon (라면), from Japanese ラーメン (rāmen), from Mandarin Chinese 拉麵 (拉面; lāmiàn) is the Korean equivalent of instant noodles. The first ramyeon brand in South Korea was Samyang. Shin Ramyun (신; 辛; lit. 'spicy') is the best-selling brand in South Korea; it is manufactured by Nongshim (농심; 農心; lit. 'farmer's heart'), the leading manufacturer of ramyeon in South Korea, which exports many of its products overseas. Nongshim also manufactures the second, third, and fourth best-selling brands from 2010 to 2013, Chapagetti, Ansungtangmyun, and Neoguri, with the fifth being Samyang. After Nongshim and Samyang, the best-selling manufacturers in 2013 were Ottogi, notable for Jin Ramen, and Paldo, notable for Paldo Bibimmen. In more recent years, Samyang's Buldak Ramen has gained large popularity in South Korea and overseas.

=== North Korea ===
In 2004, over 600,000 boxes of Shin Ramyun were sent to North Korea as part of the aid relief program when the Ryongchŏn train station exploded, injuring many people. Insider sources have said that most of the noodles were sold on black markets, making their way to Pyongyang instead of being distributed as aid. North Korean visitors to China also frequently purchase South Korean ramyeon, where Shin Ramyeon is known as "Korean Tangmi Ramyeon."

Local production of ramyeon in North Korea began in 2000. The first brand was "Kkoburang guksu", which literally means "curly noodles" in Korean. Later, a joint venture between North Korean and Hong Kong-based companies began producing "Jŭksŏk guksu" (Korean: 즉석 국수, 卽席 국수), which literally means "instant noodles". Ramyeon is popular among North Korean elites who live in Pyongyang and Nampo. In contrast to hot and spicy South Korean noodles, North Korean varieties have a much milder and brothier flavor. Tofu is commonly added, and accompanied with alcohol as a snack or meal. In accordance with party policy, prices for domestically produced ramyeon are significantly lower than imported Chinese and South Korean noodles, the latter of which is the most expensive.

=== Nepal ===
Per capita consumption of instant noodles in Nepal is the third highest in the world, at 53 servings. In the early 1980s, Gandaki Noodles of Pokhara city introduced Rara, an instant noodle brand named after the largest lake in Nepal. It was a success among urban populations. Around 1985, Chaudhary Groups entered the market with Wai-Wai, a Thai brand of instant noodles, which became a big hit. Over the years, the popularity of instant noodles has grown and consist of a major part of the dry foods sold in Nepal.

=== Nigeria ===
Since its introduction in 1988, Indomie is the most popular instant noodle brand in Nigeria. Instant noodles are now eaten in most households across the country. By 2008, nine other brands of noodles had appeared in Nigeria. Affirming Indomie's hold on the market, Christopher Ezendu, a distributor at the popular Oke-Arin market on Lagos Island, reported that these other brands are aspiring to be like the market leader. In 2013, a wholly owned and managed Nigerian company based in Abuja, Royal Mills and Foods limited, launched a new brand of instant noodles, De-Royal Instant Noodles, with two flavors, chicken and onion chicken.

According to the World Instant Noodle Association, Nigeria was the eleventh largest consumer of instant noodles in the world in 2019.

=== Pakistan ===
Instant noodles are not a traditional part of Pakistani cuisine but have become popular in flavors such as masala and chicken. There are three prominent brands of instant noodles in Pakistan: Nestlé's Maggi was the first to enter the market in 1992, followed by Knorr of Unilever in 1993; in 2012, Shan Food Industries introduced "Shoop". Knorr is the leader, with 55% market share; Maggi's market share is 45%.

=== Philippines ===
Instant noodles were introduced in 1989 by Monde Nissin, with the introduction of Lucky Me!, the leading instant noodle brand in the Philippines. A year later, Zest-O Corporation also introduced their own instant noodle brand, Quickchow in 1990, followed by Payless in 1995 and Ho-Mi in 2002.

In 1997, Universal Robina partnered with Japanese company Nissin Foods to form the joint venture Nissin-Universal Robina Corporation with Nissin Cup Noodles as their first product.

=== Poland ===
Instant noodles began appearing on Polish store shelves during the early 1990s. Despite being called "Chinese soup", the first brands on the market were produced in Vietnam and had a somewhat spicy, garlic-flavored taste. The noodle packages contained pouches of flavored soup base, spicy oil, dried vegetables, or even minuscule shrimps.

The product gained particular popularity among students due to its affordability and convenience. "Kaczka łagodna" ("Mild duck"), "Kurczakowa łagodna" ("Mild chicken"), and "Krewetkowa ostra" ("Spicy shrimp") were the most common flavors. Today, the local Kim Lan and international Knorr brands offer varieties ranging from cheese-and-herb-flavored noodles to local Polish specialties like barszcz czerwony or żurek.

Ngoc Tu Tao, who emigrated to Poland from Vietnam and established the Tan-Viet Group in 1990, is credited with introducing instant noodles to Poland. His Vifon brand holds a 35% share of the Polish instant soup market, selling over 100 million packages a year. Ngoc Tu Tao has appeared in Wprost magazine's annual ranking of the 100 most wealthy Polish citizens.

=== Russia ===
Russia's most popular instant ramen are from local brand Rollton and the Korean Doshirak. Instant noodles have been popular in Russia's eastern regions since the late 1980s and made their way west in the early 1990s. In Russia, like most noodle products, they are still considered a lesser-quality option to turn to in lean economic times and are popular among college students.

=== Sri Lanka ===
A variety of instant noodles are available in Sri Lanka and appeal to local tastes. Examples include rice noodles or kurakkan noodles, as well as curry-flavoured and kottu-flavoured noodles.

Over 8,000 tonnes of instant noodles are consumed in Sri Lanka each year. Maggi, Sera, Harischandra are some the biggest brands in Sri Lanka.

=== Taiwan ===
Instant noodle inventor Momofuku Ando was born in Japanese Taiwan. According to statistics from the International Ramen Manufacturers Association, Taiwan is the world's twelfth-largest instant noodle market, with an annual NT$10 billion (US$300 million) in sales. This translates into an annual total of 900 million packs, or forty per person. Uni-President (aka President or Tong-Yi, 統一) takes the largest market share of instant noodles in the country, and is a major player in the global instant noodle market.

Major makers Taiwanese instant noodle manufacturers include:

- Uni-President is the first instant noodle maker in Taiwan. In 1970, the company launched their original product. Uni-President has the greatest market share in Taiwan and is also one of the largest instant noodle makers in mainland China.
- VEDAN (味丹; Pinyin: Wei Dan) is a Taiwanese food company headquartered in Shalu District, Taichung City. Vedan started its business mainly by producing sodium glutamate (MSG). It is currently one of the top ten MSG manufacturers in the world. In addition, the company has successively invested in instant noodles, beverages, and many other food products since 1973.
- Wei Lih (維力) is a well-known food company in Taiwan founded in 1970. It is headquartered in Changhua County. Its main product is instant noodles, and it also produces snacks, beverages, seasonings, and biotech products. Wei Lih is famous for its Zhajiangmian (炸醬麵) and Good Good Eat Noodles (張君雅小妹妹).

=== Thailand ===
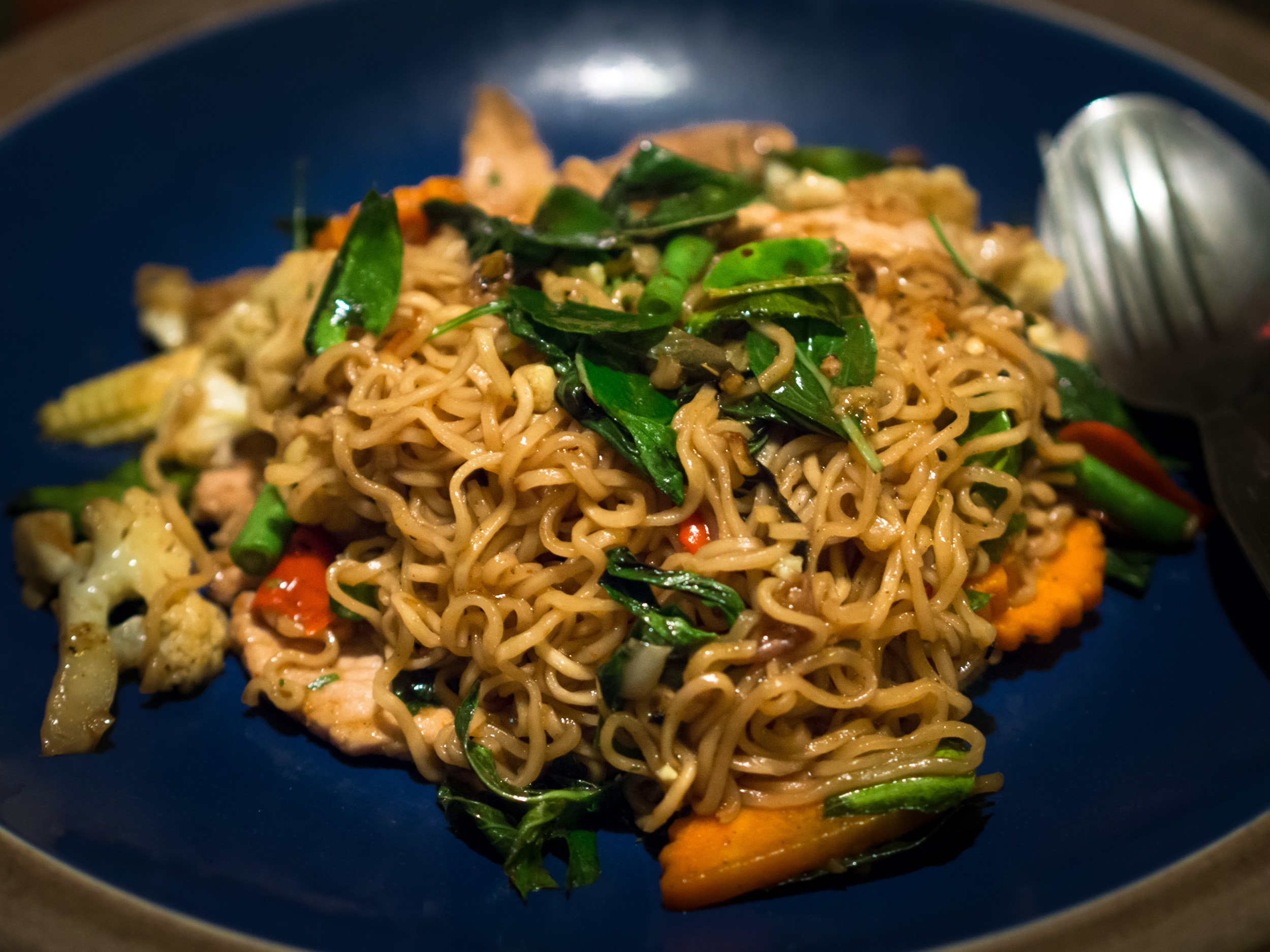
Phat mama (stir-fried instant noodles) is a popular dish in Thailand.

Thailand's instant noodle market in 2019 was estimated to be worth 17 billion baht. The market leader is the MAMA (Thai: มาม่า) brand, produced by Thai President Foods. MAMA got its start in 1972 as a joint venture between Taiwan's President Enterprise and Thailand's Saha Pathanapibul PLC. The brand controls about half the Thai instant noodle market, and "Mama" has become a generic name for instant noodles in Thailand. Thai people consume an average of 45 packs of noodles per person per year, fourth in the world after Indonesia, Vietnam, and Malaysia.

In second place is the Wai Wai brand from Thai Preserved Food Factory at 23–24 percent, followed by Ajinomoto's Yum Yum brand at 20–21 percent.

Due to their ubiquity, instant noodles were chosen as a vehicle for dietary fortification by a joint effort of the Federation of Thai Industries, instant noodle producers, and the Ministry of Public Health about ten years ago. The vitamins and minerals added are iron, iodine, and vitamin A.

=== Ukraine ===
The first time instant noodles appeared in the Ukrainian market in the 1990s, and quickly became iconic food. The first Ukrainian brand of instant noodles was Mivina (Ukrainian: Мівіна) created in 1995 by Technocom (Ukrainian: Техноком) - the company founded in 1993 by Vietnamese entrepreneur Phạm Nhật Vượng. The name of the brand comes from vietnamese "mì Việt Nam", which translates as "Vietnamese noodles". Due to popularity of the brand, the name "Mivina" became a household name for instant noodles among Ukrainian consumers.

From the start, instant noodles was often eaten in raw as a snack in Ukraine. It was especially popular among schoolchildren. Knowing that, Mivina created the child-oriented sweet instant noodles with cinnamon and vanilla flavour. Later it was replaced with orange, pineapple, coconut, banana and strawberry flavours. Despite its popularity, the sweet Mivina was discontinued, but was returned for short period in 2017 under the name Mivina Fruktel (Ukrainian: Мівіна Фруктель), with banana and strawberry flavours only.

Instant noodles are also often used as an ingredient in various recipes.

In 2010, Technocom and Mivina was sold to Nestlé. The diversity of products decreased with time. In the late 2010s the brand became focused on more expensive products.

Other brands available in Ukrainian market are Rollton and Big Bon produced by Mareven Food Europe LLC (Ukrainian: ТОВ Маревен Фуд Європа), Golden Dragon, Tanuki (Ukrainian: Танукі), Rooltick and Ukrainian Star (Ukrainian: Українська Зірка) produced by LLC Kuhovar (Ukrainian: ТОВ Куховар). Most supermarket chains have their own instant noodles brands.

=== United Kingdom ===
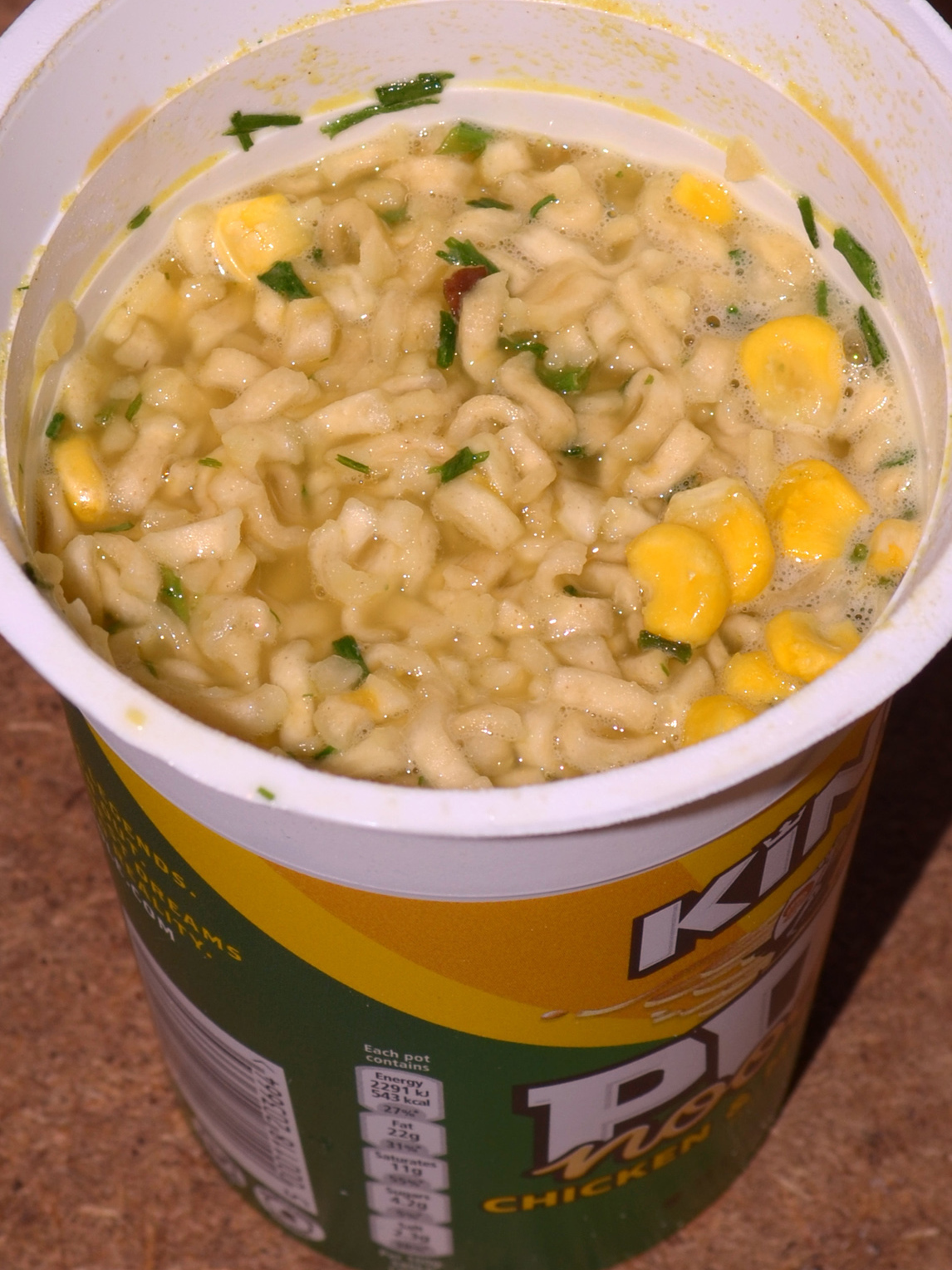
Chicken and mushroom flavor Pot Noodle

A common form of instant noodles in Britain is Pot Noodle, a cup noodle launched by Golden Wonder in the 1977 and acquired by Unilever in 1995.

Packet noodles such as Batchelors' Super Noodles, which were originally made by Kellogg's, have been sold since 1979. Bigger supermarkets also sell foreign brands, such as Nissin, Koka noodles, and Shin Ramyun, which once could only be found in Asian groceries. Larger retail chains may offer their own brand in basic packaging and a variety of flavors, e.g., Asda, Maggi. Kabuto Noodles, launched in 2010, was the UK's first up-market instant noodle brand, followed by Itsu and Mr Lee's Noodles.

=== United States ===
In the United States, instant noodles were first made available by Nissin Foods in 1971. In 1972, the company introduced "Nissin Cup Noodles" in a foam food cup, which led to an upsurge in popularity. Soon after, many other competing companies were offering similar instant noodle products.

Today in the U.S., instant noodles are commonly known as "ramen", after the Japanese dish on which they were originally based, and they come in a variety of flavors such as beef, chicken, and shrimp. Ramen has become synonymous in America for all instant noodle products. Some prominent brands are Top Ramen (originally Top Ramen's Oodles of Noodles), Maruchan, and Sapporo Ichiban. A wide range of popular brands imported from other countries are available at many Asian grocery stores and some supermarkets. Instant ramen noodles are popular among students and people of low income, due to their ease of preparation, versatility, and low cost.

According to research by Michael Gibson-Light, a doctoral candidate at the University of Arizona School of Sociology, in the US prison system, by 2016 ramen packets had become a form of commodity currency, comprising a mainstay of the informal economy there and supplanting cigarettes.

=== Vietnam ===
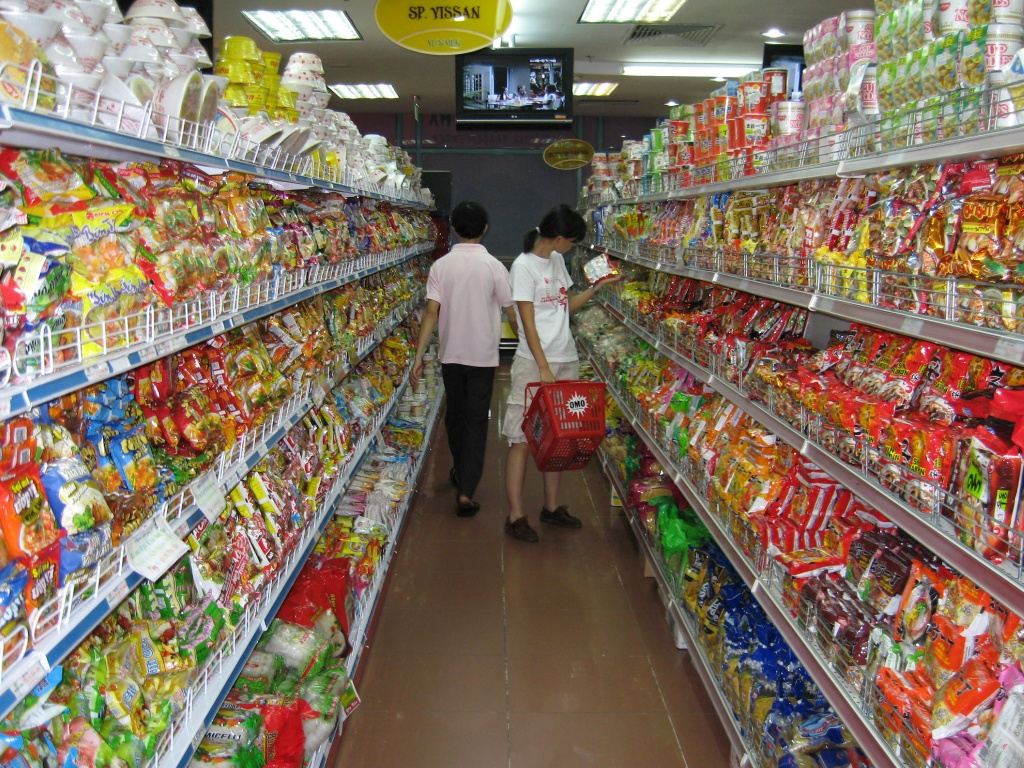
Instant noodle aisle in a supermarket at the Saigon Tax Trade Center, Ho Chi Minh City, Vietnam

Instant noodles are popular in Vietnam, where they are often eaten as a breakfast food. Per capita consumption in 2018 was 54 servings per year. Both wheat and rice noodles are common. Acecook Vietnam, Masan Food, and AsiaFoods are leading producers of instant noodles.

== Gallery ==
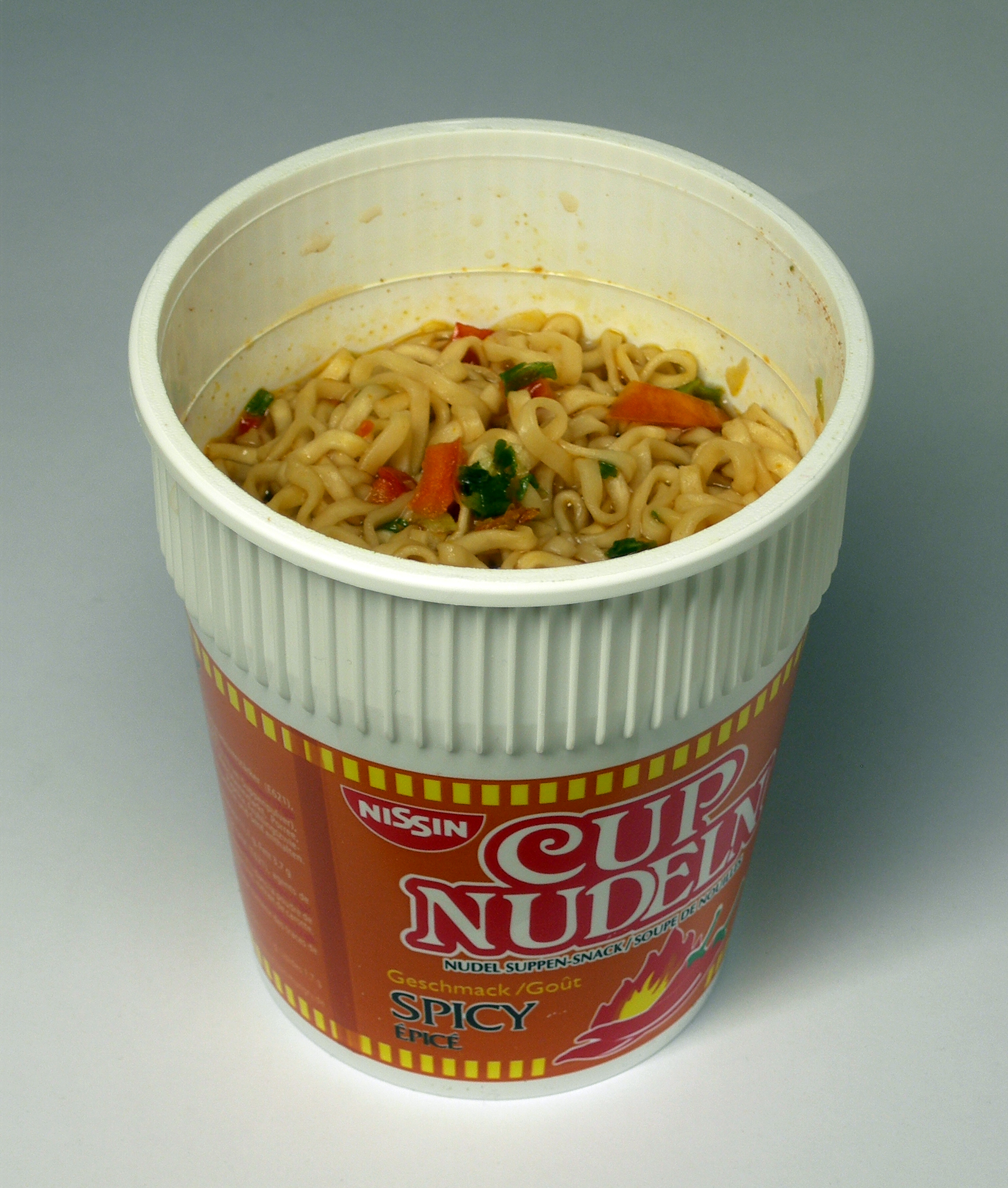
German Cup Nudeln (Cup Noodles), spicy flavor

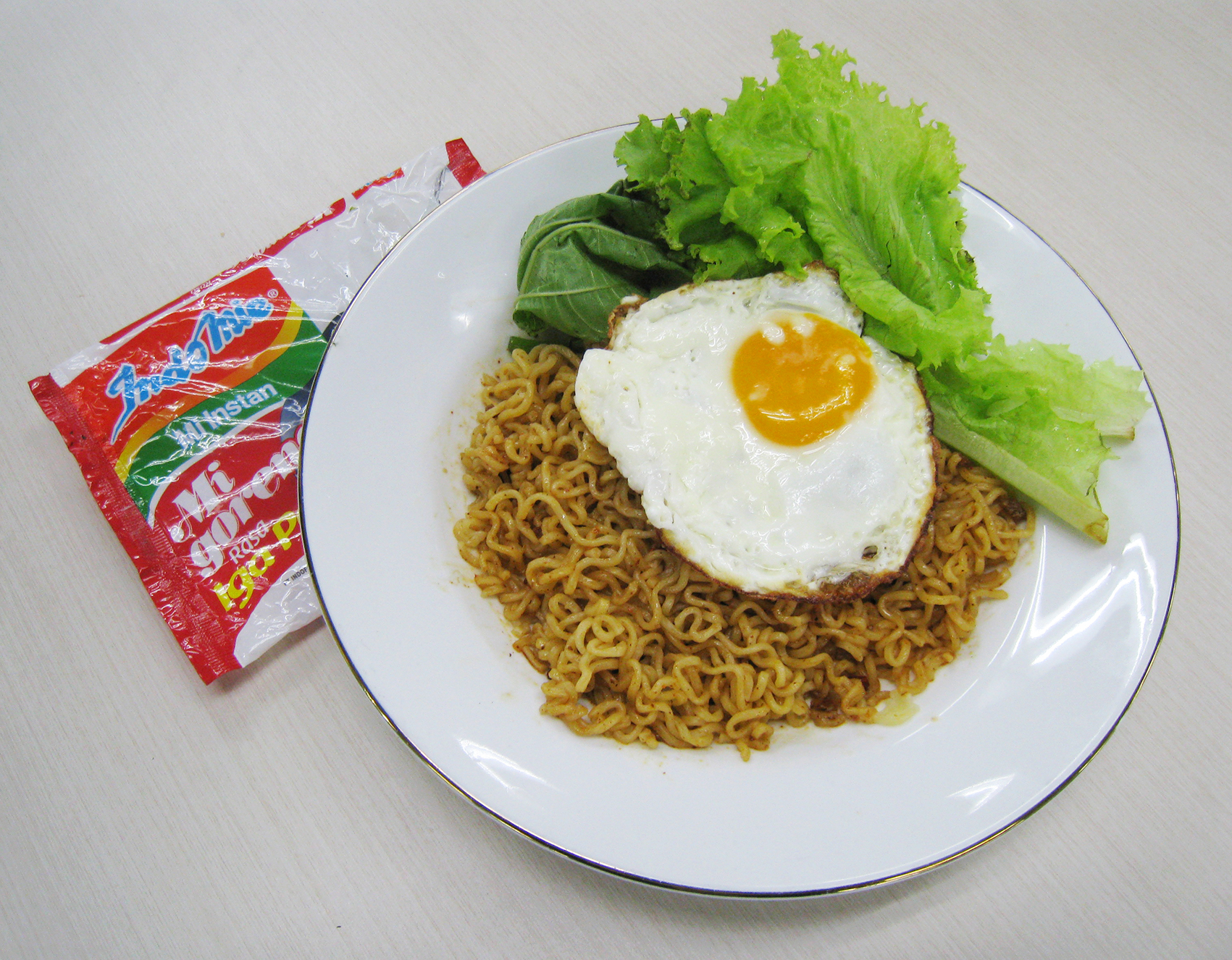
Indomie Mi goreng served with fried egg and vegetables

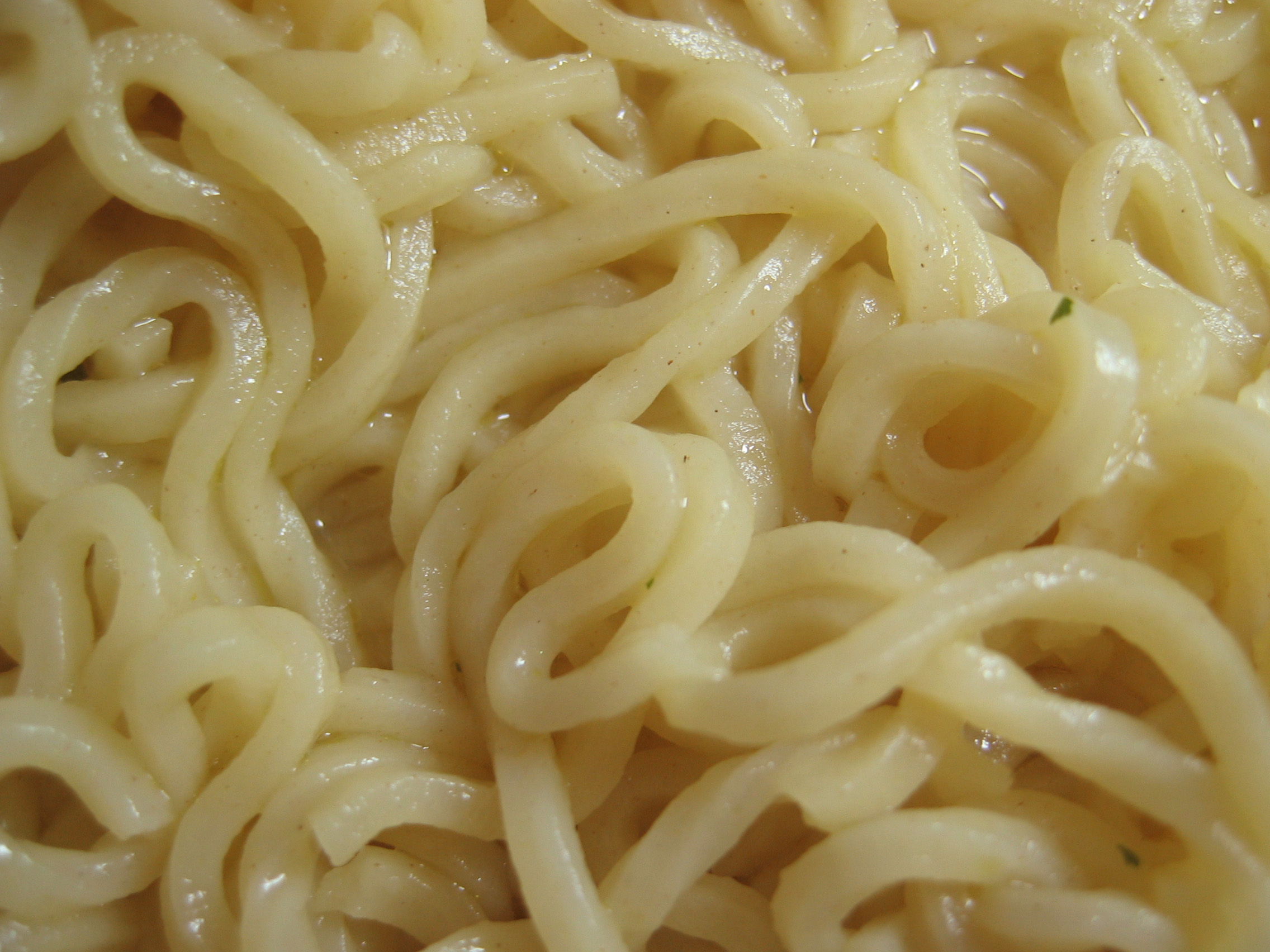
Cooked Super Noodles

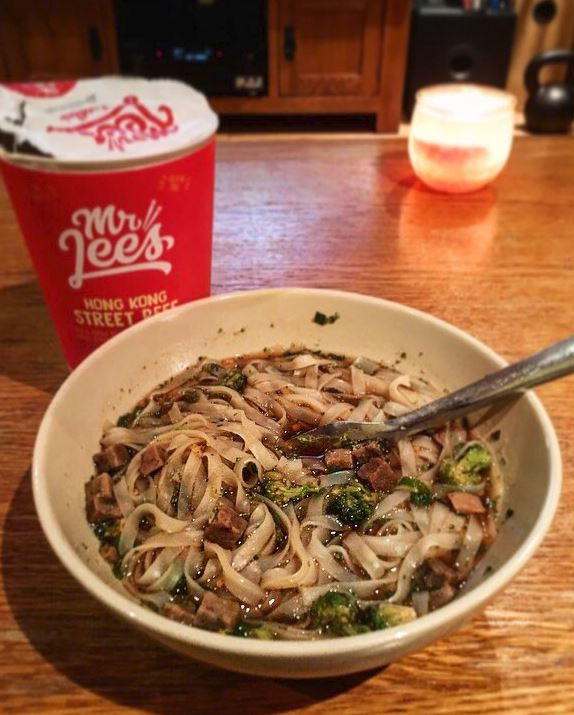
Mr Lee's Noodles Hong Kong Street Beef decanted into the bowl

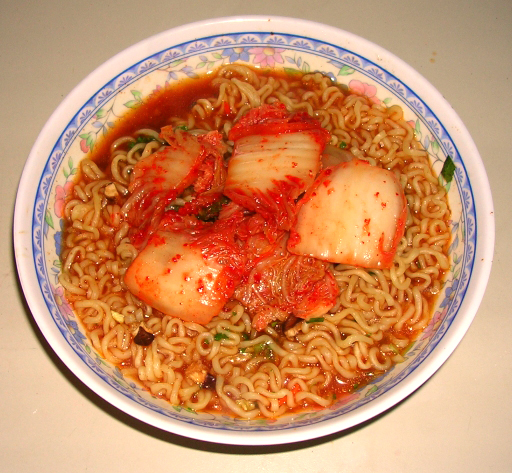
Shin Ramyun is often drunk with kimchi as a topping or on the side.

== See also ==
- List of brand name food products
- List of instant foods
- List of noodles
- List of noodle dishes
- List of pasta
