= Super Noodles =

British brand of instant noodle snack

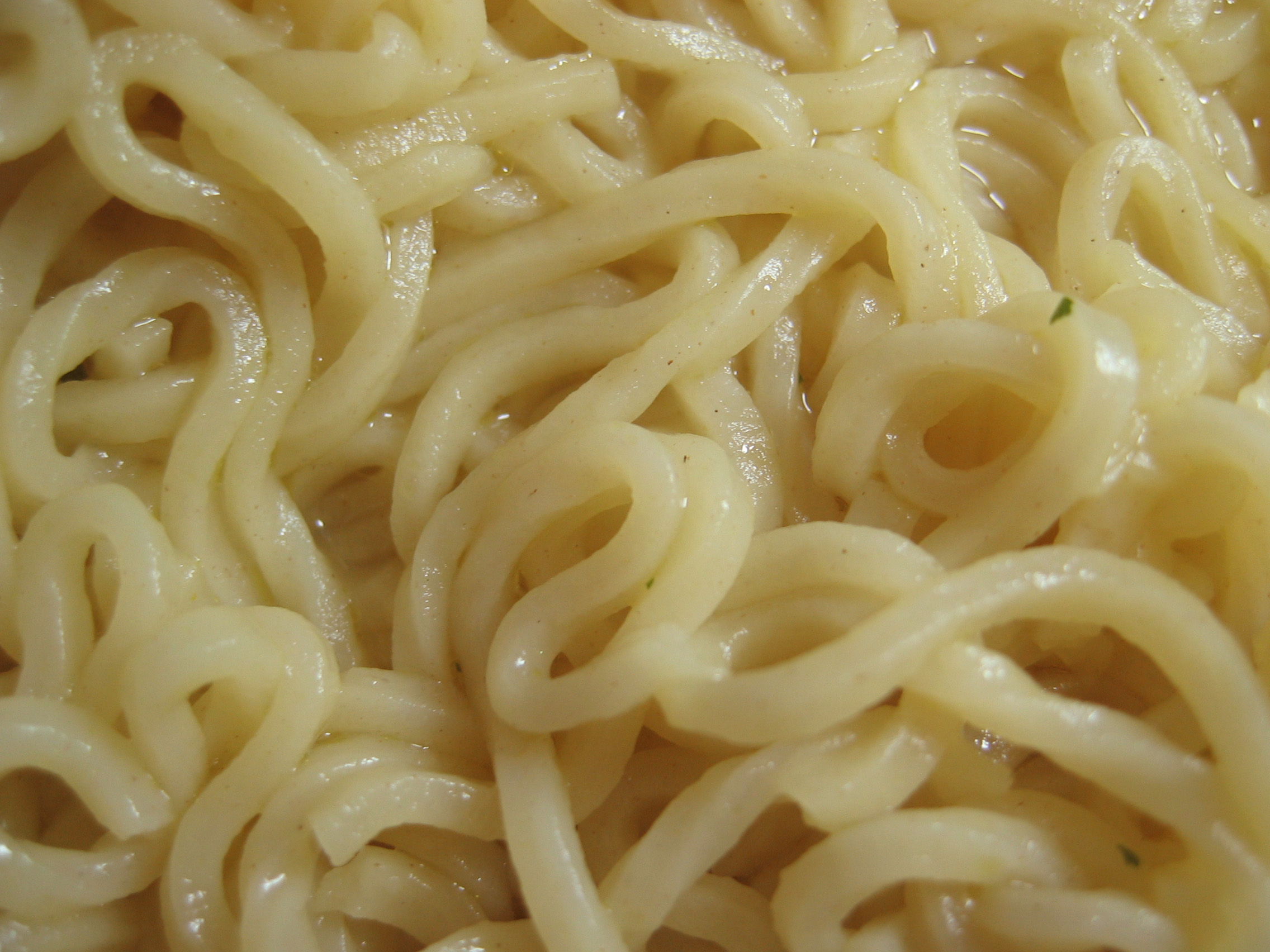
Cooked Super Noodles

Super Noodles is the brand name of a dehydrated instant noodle snack, made by Batchelors in the United Kingdom (previously made by Kellogg's) and sold under the McDonnells brand in Ireland. They are prepared by being placed in a pot of boiling water, adding the sachet of flavouring, and stirring. Super Noodles can also be cooked and prepared using a microwave oven.

The brand is currently owned by Premier Foods in the United Kingdom, and Boyne Valley Group in Ireland. In February 2017, Premier released Super Noodles pots. The line up has "exceeded expectation", selling over 13 million units giving Premier its "strongest growth in five years".

== Super Noodles To Go ==
Super Noodles To Go is a cup noodle sister product, competing with Pot Noodle. Rather than preparing the noodles in a saucepan of boiling water, the consumer pours boiling water into the cup of noodles and stirs. Flavours include Roast Chicken, however, the flavour differs from the standard Super Noodle range.

== Commercials ==
The convenience of the product targeted a male demographic in UK television commercials during the late 1990s. It featured the early performances of Martin Freeman, Peter Serafinowicz and Jake Wood in humorous situations reflecting British “Lad culture” of the era.

In June 1999, 59 viewers complained to the Independent Television Commission (ITC) regarding one advert, showing a baby's father wiping his mouth on a clean shirt and pretending the baby was responsible for the mess, causing the baby to cry. Complainants were worried that the baby had been deliberately upset during filming; however advertising agency Mother said they caused the baby no distress and that the commercial compiled with child performer legislation. The ITC said the ad did not fall short of their guidelines and that the lighthearted commercial should not be taken too seriously.

== Restaurant ==
In October 2018, new restaurant Frankie's Toasties, opened on Portland Street in Manchester and began serving "32 fillings including Mars Bars and Super Noodles". The "Salford Super Noodle Butty" includes Super Noodles with instant chicken flavour noodles.

== See also ==
- Cup Noodles
- Indomie
- Koka noodles
- List of instant noodle brands
- Maggi noodles
