= Jjapaguri =

Korean instant noodle dish

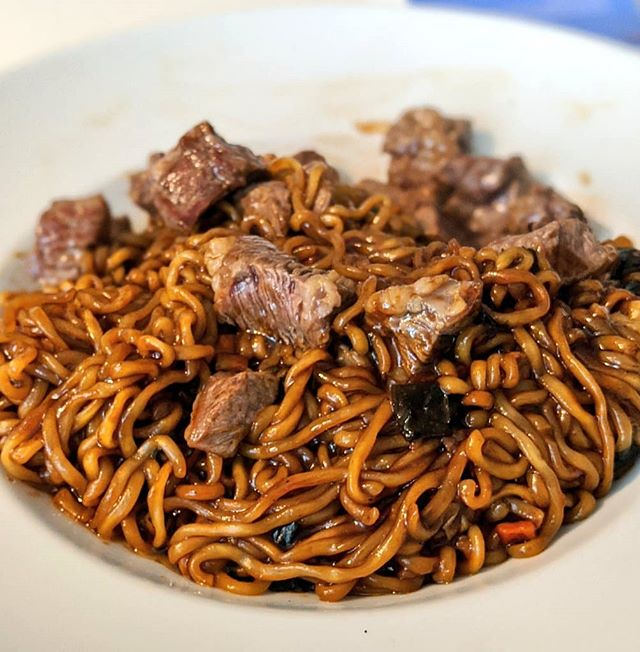
Jjapaguri (ram-don) with beef, as featured in Parasite

Jjapaguri or Chapaguri (Korean: 짜파구리), also known in English as ram-don, is a South Korean noodle dish that is a combination of Chapagetti and Neoguri, two types of instant noodles produced by Nongshim. Irene Jiang of Insider described it as "comfort food". University of California East Asian studies professor Jennifer Jung-Kim described it as, as paraphrased by Sarah Coughlin, "a budget comfort food", and Coughlin herself described it as "a uniquely Korean dish".

== History ==
Jjapaguri gained prominence on the internet and in South Korean pojangmachas when it was featured on an episode of Dad! Where Are We Going? (2013; S01 E06).

Darcy Paquet, the translator of the critically acclaimed, Oscar winning film Parasite (2019), rendered the dish, featured in the film, as ram-don, meaning ramen-udon. The English version of the film shows packages labelled in English "ramyeon" and "udon" to highlight to English speakers how the name was created. Paquet believed the word ram-don did not previously exist as he found no results on Google.

People began posting videos on how to make the dish on YouTube after the film was distributed. The popularity of the dish led to Nongshim, the manufacturer of both products, selling a "Spicy Chapaguri" instant noodle package combining both products.
