= Mr. Noodles =

Canadian instant noodle brand

- Current logo
- Type: Private
- Industry: Food manufacturing
- Founded: 1970s
- Founder: Anderson Watts Limited
- Headquarters: Vancouver, B.C., Canada
- Area served: Canada
- Owner: Beltek Foods; Anderson Watts Limited

Mr. Noodles is the brand name of a Canadian instant noodles product, dating back to the 1970s. Packages are imported by Canadian products supplier Anderson Watts Ltd. of Vancouver and manufactured by partner Beltek Foods of Huizhou, China, the Mr. Noodles brand is sold in packages the same size of traditional ramen. Mr. Noodles is sold in instant ramen packs (single, dual or multi-pack), instant ramen cups or instant ramen bowls. It is sold at grocery and convenience stores, and sometimes in vending machines.

Vice magazine's article “The Definitive Ranking of the Best Late-Night Snacks for Canadian Students” considered mixing a box of Kraft Dinner and Mr. Noodles as “God-Level Drunk Food Tier”.

== See also ==
- Maruchan
- Cup noodles
- Pot Noodle
- Sapporo Ichiban
- List of instant noodle brands
