= Dasha Doshik =

Russian-Kazakhstani blogger (born 2004)

Darya Perova
- Дарья Перова
- Born: March 6, 2004 (age 22); Talgar, Kazakhstan
- Years active: 2020-present

Darya Vadimovna Perova (Russian: Да́рья Вади́мовна Перо́ва; born March 6, 2004) known professionally as Dasha Doshik, is a Russian-speaking TikToker, YouTuber, singer, actress, and erotic model from Kazakhstan.

== Early life and education ==
She was born on March 6, 2004, in Talgar, Kazakhstan. She grew up with her older sister Anastasia. After completing nine grades, she enrolled in an architectural and construction college. During her studies, she talked on social media about her entrance exam in drawing and a coursework project in which she built a model of a house in Minecraft based on real architectural blueprints.

During her school years, she received the nickname "Doshik" related to her light hair color and curly hairstyle, named after the instant noodle product "Dosirac" (Доширак in Cyrillic) She later used it as the basis for her stage name.

== Career ==
As a teenager, she began streaming on Twitch and posting stream highlight clips on YouTube. At the age of 16, she started creating short videos on the Musical.ly app, which was later absorbed by TikTok. Her first popularity came from stories about school, exams, and her personal life, as well as everyday humorous videos. Her parents opposed her passion for blogging and her move to Moscow; her mother threw away filming equipment, including cosmetics and ring lights. She said she received support from her older sister Anastasia and her boyfriend Nikita.

In 2021, she took part in the filming of the music video "Swipe" by rapper and TikToker Rakhim, in which she appeared as a Samsung company consultant, and also took part in Egor Kreed's show "Squid Game in Real Life." In December of the same year, she became the fifth person from the CIS to reach one billion likes on TikTok. Early in her career, Dasha faced hate and criticism from her audience, including over her appearance; in particular, the girl was compared to the character Gollum from The Lord of the Rings film trilogy.

In January 2022, the news portal Zakon.kz included Dasha in the top 5 most famous Kazakhstani TikTokers. In February of the same year, Dasha Doshik became the host of the romantic show "Crush" on the Bubblegun channel. A few months later, she started a new YouTube channel, publishing as her first video a clip in which she does her makeup with children's cosmetics. On March 8 of the same year, she launched a community on VKontakte. The community reached 950,000 subscribers, and the materials published in it garnered 1,300,000,000 views on VK Clips. Dasha later began posting lifestyle content about fashion and beauty on VK Video, including makeup videos.

In 2023, she made her acting debut in the film Yolki 10, playing a girl named Katya. That same year, on her birthday, during a stream with her boyfriend and TikToker Tenderlybae, she announced the release of her debut song.

In 2026, she began selling her erotic photographs in a private Telegram channel and on OnlyFans, as a result of which her TikTok account was soon blocked. In August of the same year, she obtained a Russian residence permit.

== Personal life ==
In October 2020, Dasha announced her relationship with a young man named Nikita. In the summer of 2023, they announced their breakup, explaining it by saying they had "simply outgrown the relationship." She later spoke about a short-term relationship with a man ten years her senior. According to her, the romance lasted about two weeks.

=== Health problems ===
Dasha spoke about the surgical removal of a tumor in the area of a mole on her back. According to her, the growth had penetrated deep into the tissue, and its removal required an operation carried out in four stages. In March 2026, it emerged that she suffers from bipolar and obsessive-compulsive disorders.

== Filmography ==
- Yolki 10 (The Christmas Trees 10)

== Discography ==
Year	Title
2024	"Lisa"
2024	"Dengi, Zay"
2024	"Siniy Iney"
2024	"Charodeyka"
2025	"Lisa (Harddope & Phonkdope Remix)"
2025	"Luchshaya byvshaya"
2025	"Dlya tebya"
