= Rara noodle (food brand) =

Thai brand of instant noodles

Rara Noodles
- Product type: Instant noodles
- Produced by: Gandaki Noodles (P.) Ltd.
- Country: Nepal
- Introduced: 1980
- Markets: Worldwide

Rara Noodle (रारा चाउचाउ or रारा तयारी चाउचाउ) manufactured by Gandaki Noodles (P.) Ltd. in Pokhara is the first instant noodle of Nepal and also the SAARC nations. The product was introduced in the 1980s. The noodle was named after the largest lake of Nepal, the Rara Lake. The noodle held as the first position in the noodle market until Wai-Wai was introduced in 1984. Currently, it is produced by Him-Shree Foods. The company also created an iconic marketing catchphrase आर् ए आर् ए रारा, मीठो भन्छन् सारा (trans. R A R A RARA, Everyone says it's delicious.) which is the theme jingle for the product.

The noodle is pre-cooked and flavoured and it can be eaten straight from the packet or cooked.

== History ==
According to the founder and CEO of company Krishna Acharya and Phanindra Man Shrestha, the company first started by purchasing Chinese noodle-making machines to produce the Cinke Chaumin (सिन्के चाउमिन). To make the production in large scale, they contacted the Japanese machine manufacture and purchased machine in NPR 3,500,000.

To get permission from the government, they applied for a license but it was declined saying the market is small and big industries are not feasible. Later the licence was agreed, but they were asked to set up the factory in Kathmandu instead of Pokhara. However, after a meeting with King Birendra in his visit to Pokhara, permission was granted to open the factory in Pokhara.

While paying for the machine, the company had to face a charge of money laundering because the office in charge thought NPR 3.5 million was too large for a Needle manufacturing machine. This was settled after it was explained that it was a Noodle making machine.

After about six months of the launch of RARA noodles, Maggi was launched in India.

== Price chart ==
- Launching price in 1980, NPR 3.50 per piece
- Price in 2020, NPR 20 per piece

== Recognition ==
- IX International Food Award (1986)in Barcelona, Spain

== See also ==
- Wai Wai Noodle
- Maggi Noodle
