= Chapagetti =

South Korean brand of instant noodle

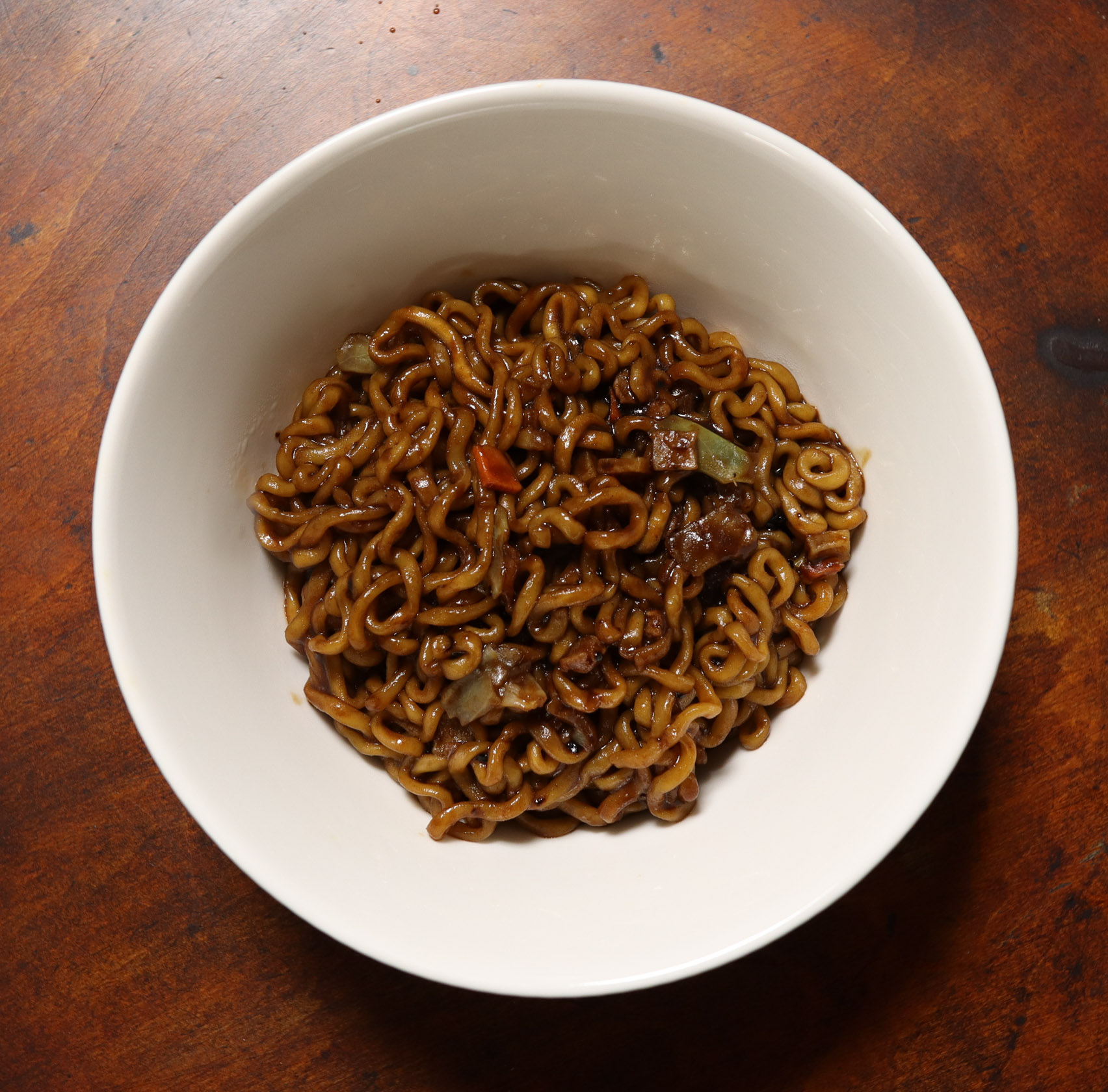
- Product type: Instant noodles (jajangmyeon)
- Produced by: Nongshim
- Country: South Korea
- Introduced: 19 March 1984; 42 years ago
- Website: nongshimusa.com/product-detail?pid=4

Chapagetti (Korean: 짜파게티) is a brand of ramyeon produced by Nongshim. It was first released in South Korea on 19 March 1984. Chapagetti is the first instant noodle product to resemble the Chinese dish jjajangmyeon (炸醬麺) in South Korea and is the second highest-selling brand of instant noodles in South Korea, behind Shin Ramyun. Its name is a portmanteau of jajangmyeon (which is also romanized as chajangmyŏn) and spaghetti. It is one of Nongshim's leading brands, with sales greater than 200 billion won per year.

== History ==
Chapagetti was first released in South Korea on March 19, 1984. The product soon gained popularity and established itself as one of Nongshim's leading brands, with sales of 200 billion won per year.

Shrimp Chapaghetti was launched in 1986, but it was discontinued due to sluggish sales. On September 6, 2004, Sichuan cuisine (Korean: 사천; Hanja: 四川; RR: Sacheon) Chapaghetti was launched.

In April 2024, to celebrate the 40th anniversary of Chapagetti, a temporary "Chapagetti Snack Shop" pop-up store was created in Seongsu-dong, Seoul. Various tasting events and games were held at the store.

A new product called "Chapagetti the Black" was also released to commemorate the brand's anniversary. A Nongshim official described the new product as having "a chewier and stronger taste while lowering calories by more than 20% with dry noodles".

== In popular culture ==
In the Academy Award-winning South Korean film Parasite, a dish called Jjapaguri (짜파구리) is cooked by one of the characters, which is a mix of Chapagetti and Neoguri. The English version of the film calls this "ram-don", an expression created by the translator, and the footage shows packages labelled in English "ramyeon" and "udon" to highlight to English speakers how the name was created. Nongshim, which manufactures both brands of noodle, published an "official" recipe for chapaguri on their YouTube channel.

== See also ==
- List of noodles
- List of instant noodle brands
- Zha Wang
