= Sesame Ramen =

Brand of ramyeon sold by Ottogi

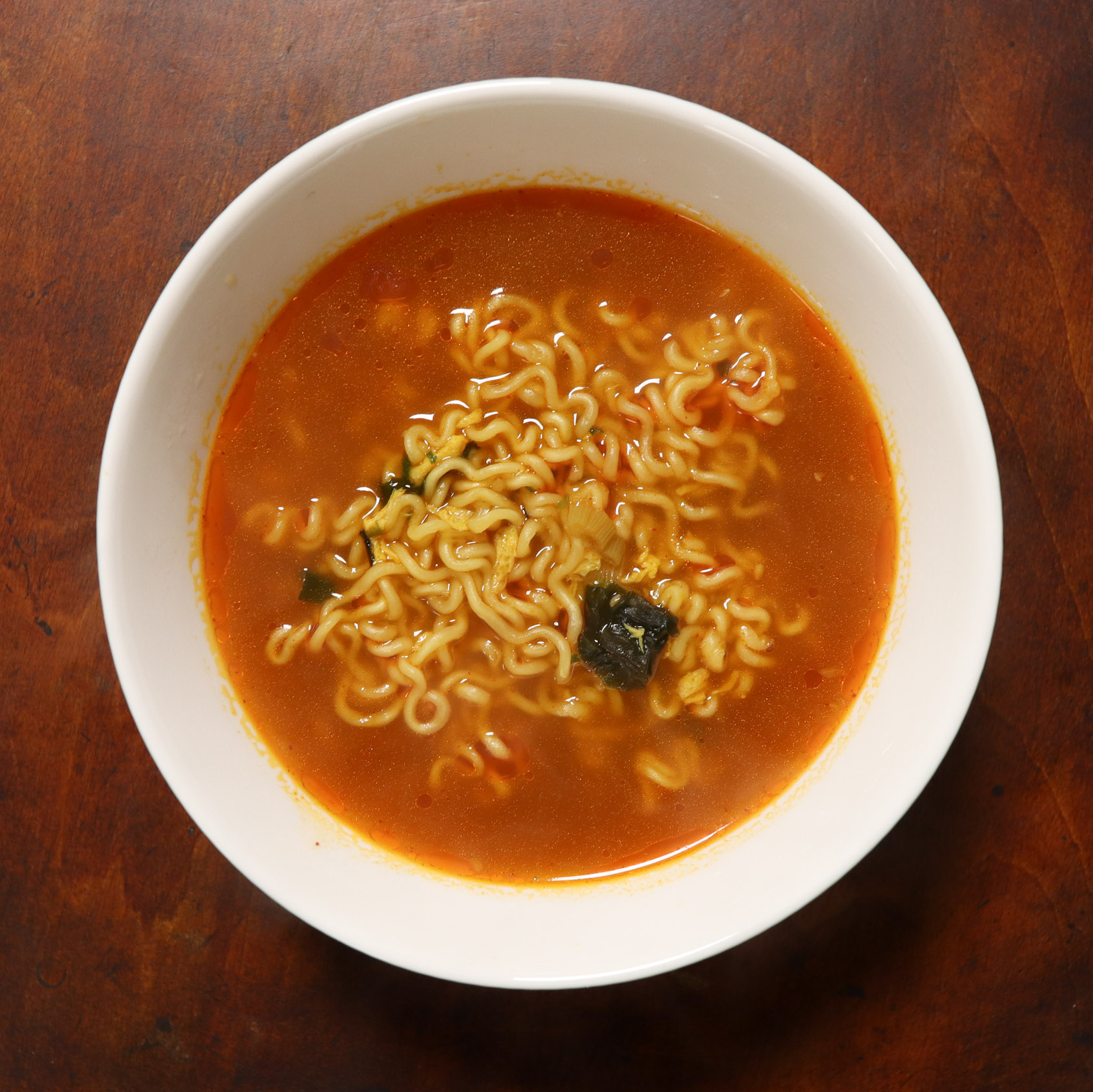
- Alternative names: 참깨라면
- Type: Noodle
- Place of origin: South Korea
- Created by: Ottogi
- Main ingredients: Dried or precooked noodle, seasoning, egg block, oil
- Food energy (per serving): 490 kcal (2,100 kJ)

Sesame Ramen (Korean: 참깨라면; RR: Chamkkae ramyeon) is a brand of ramyeon (instant noodles) sold by South Korean company Ottogi. The contents of the ramyeon are unique; it consists of a dried noodles block, seasoning, oil, sesame, and an "egg block," which is made of egg and vegetables. It is served both in a cup and a packet. In English, it means "sesame instant noodles."

== See also ==
- List of noodles
- List of instant noodle brands
