= Dosirac =

South Korean brand of instant noodles

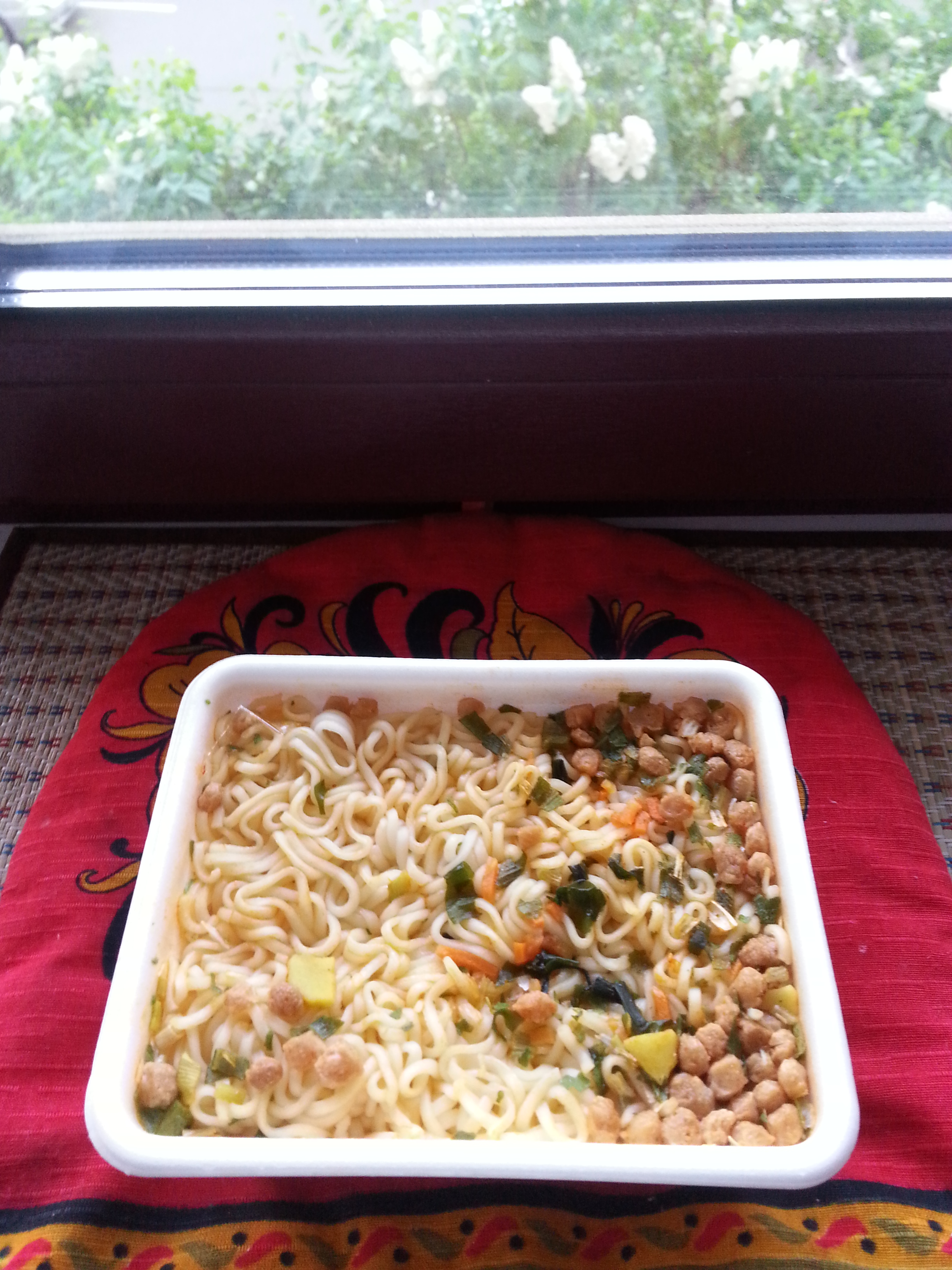
- Product type: Ramyeon
- Produced by: Paldo
- Country: South Korea
- Introduced: 1986
- Website: Official website (Russian)

Dosirac (Korean: 도시락, Russian: Доширак) is a brand of cup ramyeon produced by Paldo in South Korea since 1986. The brand is sold in 30 countries and annual sales exceed $1.5 billion. The literal translation of 도시락 means "lunchbox".

Since being introduced to the market in the 1990s, Dosirac has become one of the most popular brands of instant noodles in Russia and Central Asian nations such as Kazakhstan and Uzbekistan, albeit slightly rebranded as Doshirak (Доширак in Cyrillic). It was first introduced to Russians through sellers who visited Korea via the port of Busan. To facilitate its growing popularity in the country, Paldo opened a subsidiary in Russia in 2002. It makes up over 60% of the instant noodle market in Russia and its immense popularity has led people in the country to refer to all instant noodles as Doshirak. In June 2019, Paldo applied to register Doshirak as a trademark with Russia's patent office; after being rejected, the application sparked a court case that Paldo eventually won in 2021.

During the 2010s, the Доширак brand name was also used for simplified (no-box) instant noodles, initially known as "Kvisti", a smaller 70-gram (2.5 oz) brick of instant noodles with similar texture and similar spices. The cup-less packet was only one-third of the price of the classic box of instant noodles.

== See also ==
- Dosirak as a Korean equivalent of a lunchbox
- List of noodles
- List of instant noodle brands
