= Seoul Milk =

South Korean food and dairy cooperative

Seoul Dairy Cooperative Ltd.
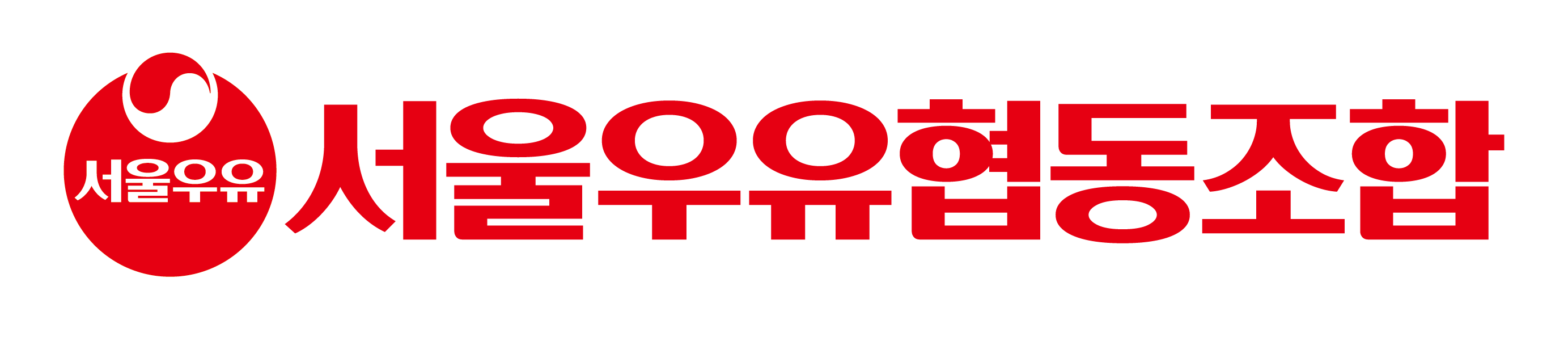
- Trade name: Seoul Milk
- Type: Private
- Industry: Dairy
- Founded: July 11, 1937; 89 years ago
- Headquarters: Seoul, South Korea
- Area served: Worldwide
- Key people: Moon Jin-sub (Chairman and CEO)
- Products: Milk; Cheese; Butter; Yogurt
- Revenue: ▲KRW 13.8 billion (2024)
- Number of employees: 1,800
- Website: www.seoulmilk.co.kr

Seoul Dairy Cooperative Ltd. (Korean: 서울우유협동조합; RR: Seoul-uyuhyeopdongjohap) is a food and dairy cooperative headquartered in Seoul, South Korea.

== Background ==
Established in 1937, Seoul Dairy produces milk, yogurt and beverage products at facilities in Yangju, Yongin, Ansan and Geochang. It is the oldest supplier of dairy products in South Korea.

In 1937, the forerunner of Seoul Milk, the Gyeongseong Milk Trade Association, was established in Jeong-dong in central Seoul. In September 1954, it was renamed the Seoul Milk Trade Association. In 1962, when Seoul Milk registered as a corporation, it became the Seoul Dairy Cooperative as its now.

The company has exported to a number of cities in China, including Qingdao, Beijing, Shanghai, Dalian and Yanji.

In December 2016, Seoul Milk launched CU Big Yogurt of convenience store chain CU.

In 2017, Seoul Milk released a milk product for pets.

In May 2021, Seoul Milk released mint-flavored chocolate milk (Mint Chocolate Latte). As "Mint chocolate group (민초단)" has become a trend in South Korea, expectations are high for the new product.

== Incidents ==
=== Nude performance incident ===
On January 26, 2003, Seoul Milk hosted a nude performance at the Insa-dong art plaza with nude models that involved pouring yogurt over their bodies to promote their new yogurt product "edible yogurt miz (먹는 요구르트 美's')" and let the customers know that the new yogurt is safe to eat and good for their skin. The performance went for an hour and out of the full performance, the performance that was conducted in three minutes was considered problematic by the legal authorities. The people who planned the event were investigated for performative obscenity charges in 2006 and the head of marketing department for Seoul milk was liable to a 5 million won fine and the nude models each was liable to a fine of 500,000 won.

== See also ==
- Korea Yakult
- Economy of South Korea
