= Neoguri (instant noodle) =

South Korean brand of ramyeon

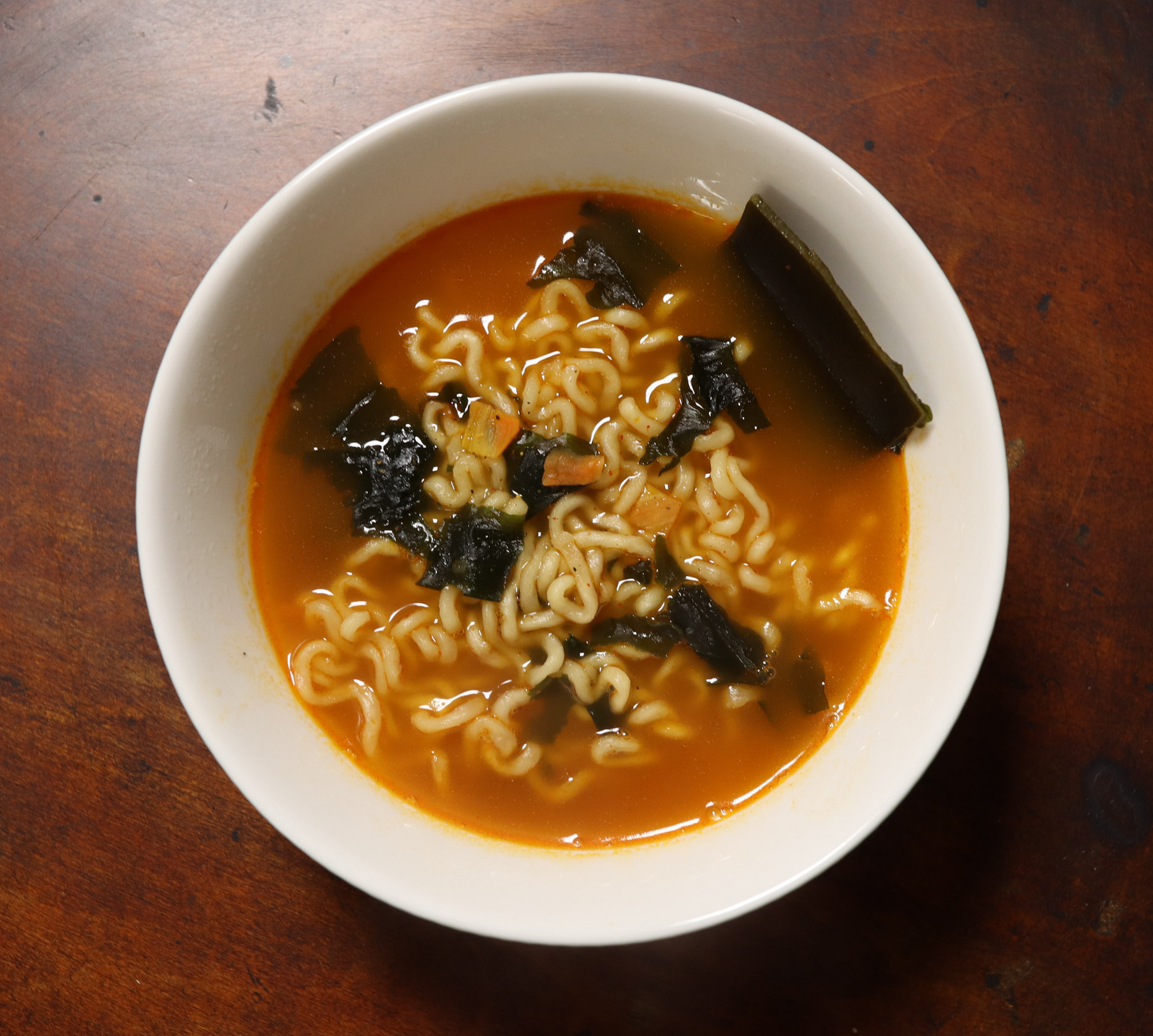
- Neoguri Ramyeon
- Product type: Instant noodles
- Produced by: Nongshim
- Country: South Korea
- Introduced: 1982; 44 years ago
- Website: Official website

Neoguri (Korean: 너구리; lit. 'raccoon dog') is a brand of ramyeon produced by South Korean company Nongshim since 1982. It is exported to over 80 countries, and is the fourth highest selling brand of noodles in South Korea. It is well known for its thick noodles and its spicy seafood flavour. The Korean version has a big piece of kombu, while the U.S. version does not have the kombu in it.

== Types of Neoguri ==
- Mild
- Hot
- Stir-fry
- 62 g cup
- 75 g cup
- Neoguri Big Bowl
- Neoguri Mild Big Bowl
- Neoguri Stir-fry Big Bowl

== In popular culture ==
In the Academy Award-winning South Korean film Parasite one of the characters prepares a dish called Jjapaguri (짜파구리) or "ram-don", a portmanteau which combines Neoguri with a second instant noodle product, the jajangmyeon-based Chapagetti (짜파게티).

== See also ==
- List of noodles
- List of instant noodle brands
- List of storms named Neoguri
