= Prima Taste =

Singaporean food and beverage brand

- Product type: Food
- Current owner: Prima Food
- Country: Singapore
- Introduced: 1998; 28 years ago in Singapore, Singapore
- Website: www.primataste.com

Prima Taste (Chinese: 百胜厨; pinyin: Bǎishèngchú; lit. 'hundred victory kitchen'), is a Singaporean food and beverage brand managed by Prima Food Pte Ltd, a wholly owned subsidiary of Prima Limited. The brand was designed for Singaporean expatriates living abroad. Its Laksa sauce kits were recommended by Singaporean chef, Janice Wong, as foodie souvenirs to take home during the 2018 North Korea–United States summit.

== History ==
Prima Taste launched in 1998, and is managed by Prima Food Pte Ltd, a subsidiary of Prima Limited which specializes in flour milling. The brand is available internationally in over 40 countries.

== Products ==
In 2011, Prima Taste launched its Singapore Laksa LaMian, a premium instant noodle product.

In 2013, Prima Taste Laksa LaMian and Prima Taste Curry LaMian were rated No. 1 and No. 2 instant noodles of all time by The Ramen Rater. Prima Taste's Wholegrain Laksa LaMian was ranked best instant noodles by The Ramen Rater from 2016 to 2018. Prima Taste also launched new Wholegrain LaMian flavours such as Prawn Soup Wholegrain LaMian.

In 2015, Prima Taste launched its Ready Meals. Ready Meals feature rice-and-protein dishes that are sealed in reheatable pouches.

In 2017, Talking Point tested three vending machine meals for "salt, fat and MSG" as the Health Promotion Board (HPB) "advises against having too much of". Prima Taste claims to have no added MSG. While Prima does not add MSG "it might be naturally present in some of the ingredients used". Charlotte Ng, head chef of Mamak Malaysian Cafe in Auckland, New Zealand recommends using Prima Taste instant noodles to get a similar taste to authentic ramen.

== Restaurants ==
A Prima Taste concept restaurant was established in Orchard Centrepoint in 2000, serving Prima Taste dishes. By 2003, two more restaurants opened at One Fullerton and The Atrium Orchard. A restaurant at Changi Airport Terminal 3 was operational between 2011 and January 2014. Eight overseas Prima Taste restaurant franchises were opened between 2003 and 2005, including in Jakarta, Indonesia and a flagship in Shanghai, China. A number of overseas restaurants have been closed and the concept restaurants are no longer mentioned on the Prima Taste corporate website.

== See also ==
- List of instant noodle brands
