= Ansungtangmyun =

South Korean ramen brand

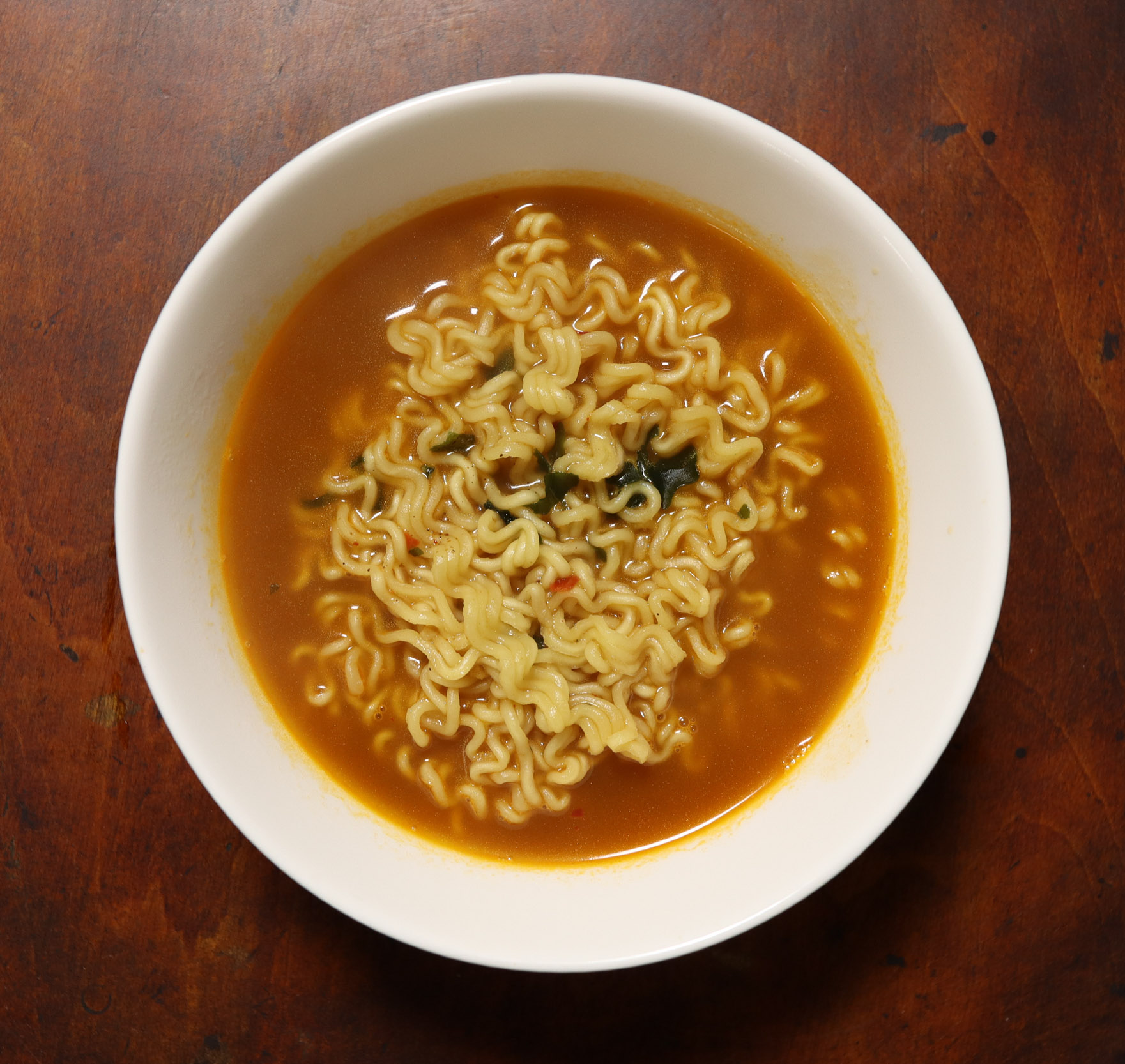
- Picture of the ramyeon, prepared
- Product type: Instant noodles
- Current owner: Nongshim
- Produced by: Nongshim
- Country: South Korea
- Introduced: 1983; 43 years ago
- Website: Official Website

Korean name
- Hangul: 안성탕면
- Hanja: 安城湯麵
- RR: Anseongtangmyeon
- MR: Ansŏngt'angmyŏn

Ansungtangmyun (Korean: 안성탕면) is a brand of ramyeon produced by Nongshim in South Korea since 1983, and is the third highest-selling brand of noodles in South Korea. It is made with beef stock from cows in Anseong. In 1992, V Ansungtangmyun and in 1996, Shrimp Ansungtangmyun was launched. On June 22, 2005, Ansungtang noodles bowl made of pop-shaped container noodles was released, but it was discontinued due to sluggish sales, and 66g Ansungtang noodles cup was released on September 11, 2010. On September 10, 2018, to mark the 35th anniversary of the sale of Ansungtangmyun, a new seafood Ansungtangmyun was launched.

== See also ==
- List of noodles
- List of instant noodle brands
