= Paldo Bibimmen =

South Korean brand of instant noodle

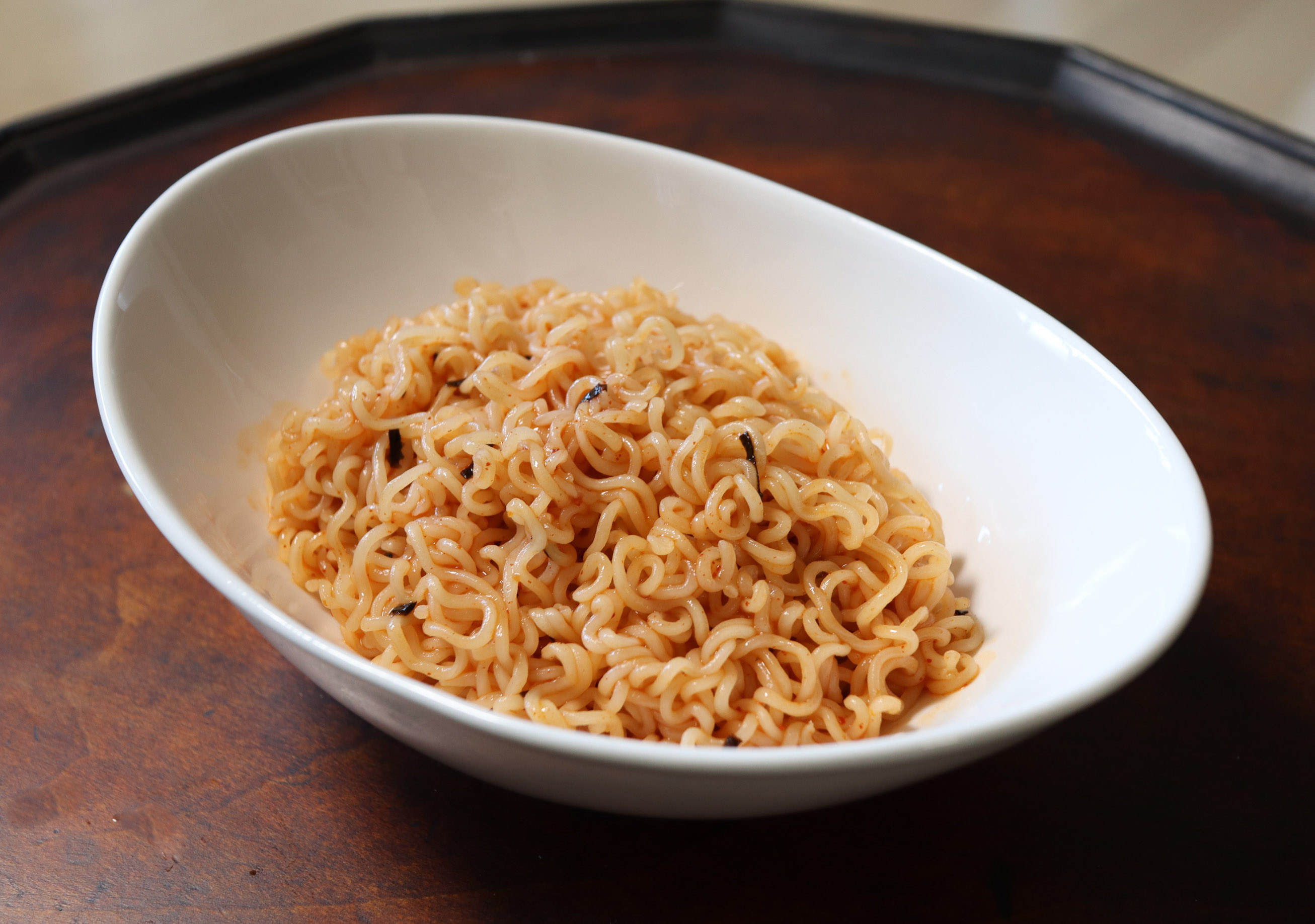
- Product type: Instant noodle (brothless ramyeon)
- Produced by: Paldo
- Country: South Korea
- Introduced: 1984
- Website: The official website of Paldo (English)

Korean name
- Hangul: 팔도 비빔면
- Hanja: 八道 비빔麵
- RR: Paldo bibimmyeon
- MR: P'alto pibimmyŏn

Paldo Bibimmen (Korean: 팔도 비빔면), formerly Paldo Bibim Men, is a brand of brothless spicy ramyeon produced by the company Paldo) since 1984. It is the oldest brothless ramyeon brand in South Korea. In 2013, Paldo Bibim Men was the tenth-ranked for ramyeon sales in South Korea, with revenues of 47 billion won that year. Paldo Bibimmen noodles are typically cooked in hot water, rinsed in cold water, and mixed with the sauce. The generic product represented by the combination of noodles with sauce is known as bibimmyeon, a combination of bibimjang (a variant on gochujang sauce) and ramyeon.

Paldo released a new variant on their standard noodle, called Bibimmen The Blue, in 2026. The product has thicker noodles than the original.

== See also ==
- List of instant noodle brands
