= Mie Sedaap =

Brand of instant noodles in Indonesia

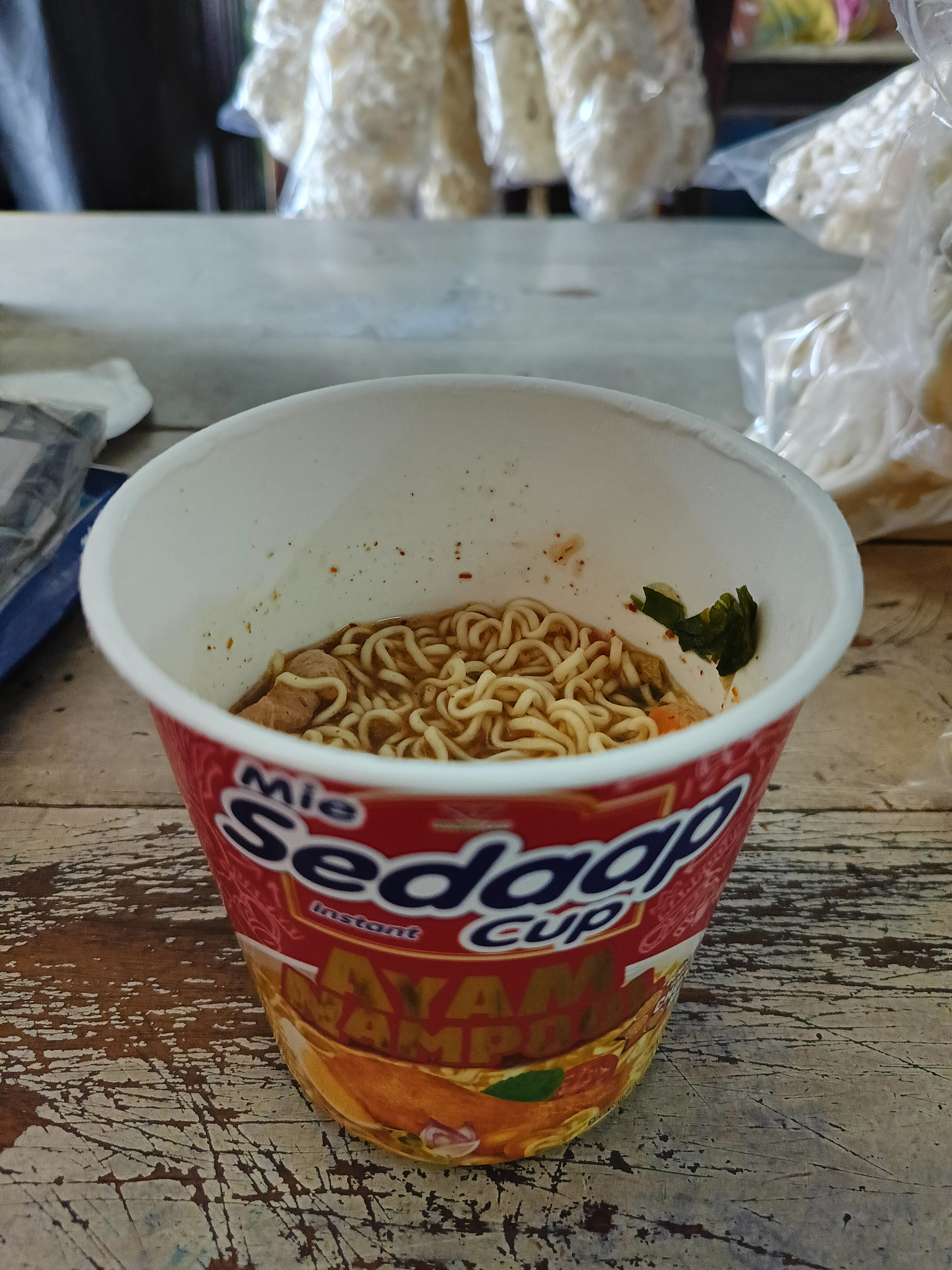
- A cup of Mie Sedaap
- Product type: Instant noodle
- Current owner: Wings Food
- Country: Indonesia
- Introduced: 2002
- Markets: Worldwide
- Tagline: "Jelas Terasa Sedapnya" lit. 'Clearly Tastes Delicious'
- Website: wingscorp.com/brand-detail/mie-sedaap/

Mie Sedaap (a.k.a. Mi Sedaap lit. 'Tasty Noodles' for export sales) is an instant noodle brand produced by Wings Food. This instant noodle product was launched in 2002 and is currently the second most popular instant noodle in Indonesia. This product is claimed to be the only instant noodle on the market that has an ISO 22000 certificate.

== Variety of flavors ==
- Mie Sedaap Goreng (since 2002)
  - Goreng
  - Krispi
  - Mi Ayam Istimewa
  - Sambal Goreng
- Mie Sedaap Kuah (since 2002)
  - Ayam Bawang
  - Ayam Bawang Telur
  - Ayam Spesial
  - Baso Spesial
  - Kari Ayam
  - Kari Spesial
  - White Curry
  - Soto
  - Kaldu Ayam (discontinued)
- Mie Sedaap Cup (since 2013)
  - Goreng
  - Ayam Bawang Telur
  - Baso Spesial
  - Kari Spesial
  - Soto
  - Selection Korean Spicy Chicken
  - Selection Korean Spicy Soup
  - Rawit Bingit Ayam Jerit
  - Rawit Bingit Baso Bleduk
- Mie Sedaap Tasty (since 2018)
  - Bakmi Ayam Daging Ayam Asli
  - Ayam Geprek Matah
  - Beef Yakiniku
- Mie Sedaap Selection (since 2019)
  - Korean Cheese Buldak
  - Korean Spicy Chicken
  - Korean Spicy Soup
  - Singapore Spicy Laksa
- Mie Sedaap Nikmat HQQ (since 2020)
  - Goreng Salero Padang
  - Goreng Ayam Bakar Limau
  - Soto Madura

== See also ==
- Indomie
- Pop Mie
- Sarimi
