= Maruchan =

Instant noodle brand

Maruchan マルちゃん
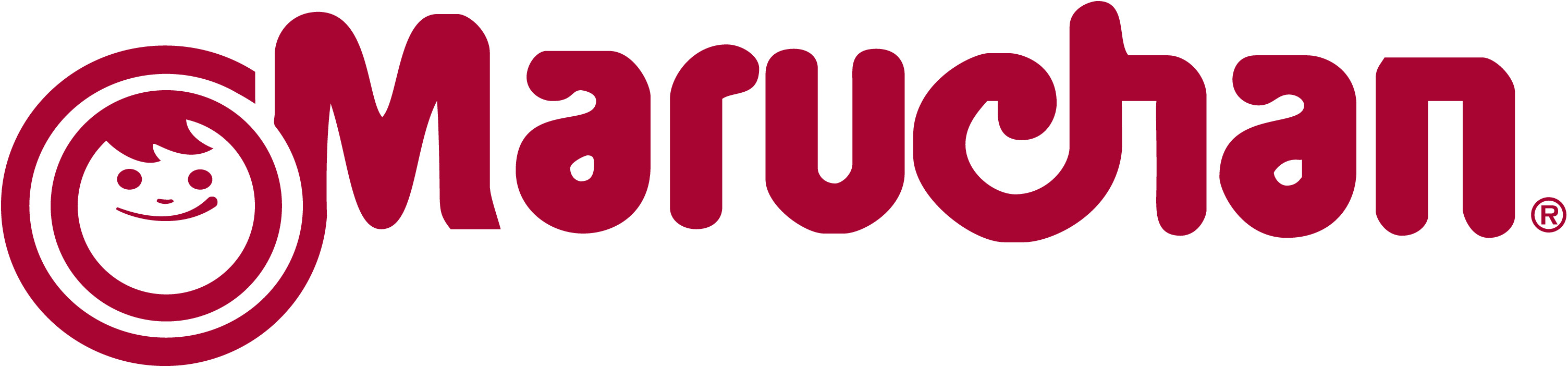
- Type: Private
- Industry: Food
- Founded: March 28, 1953; 73 years ago (Japan); 1972; 54 years ago (United States)
- Headquarters: Japan; Kōnan, Minato, Tokyo; United States; Irvine, California
- Area served: Worldwide
- Products: Maruchan Ramen; Instant Lunch; Yakisoba
- Parent: Toyo Suisan (Japan); Maruchan Inc. (United States)
- Website: maruchan.com

Maruchan (マルちゃん, Maru-chan) is a brand of instant ramen noodles, instant cup noodles, and yakisoba produced by Toyo Suisan of Tokyo, Japan. The Maruchan brand is used for noodle products in Japan and as the operating name for Toyo Suisan's division in the United States, Maruchan Inc. In 1972, Toyo Suisan entered the American market with Maruchan USA, and in 1977, established a plant in Irvine, California. Maruchan has plants in Richmond, Virginia, and Bexar County, Texas. Maruchan produces over 3.6 billion packages of ramen noodle soup a year. In the United States and Mexico, Maruchan ramen is widely popular.

== History ==
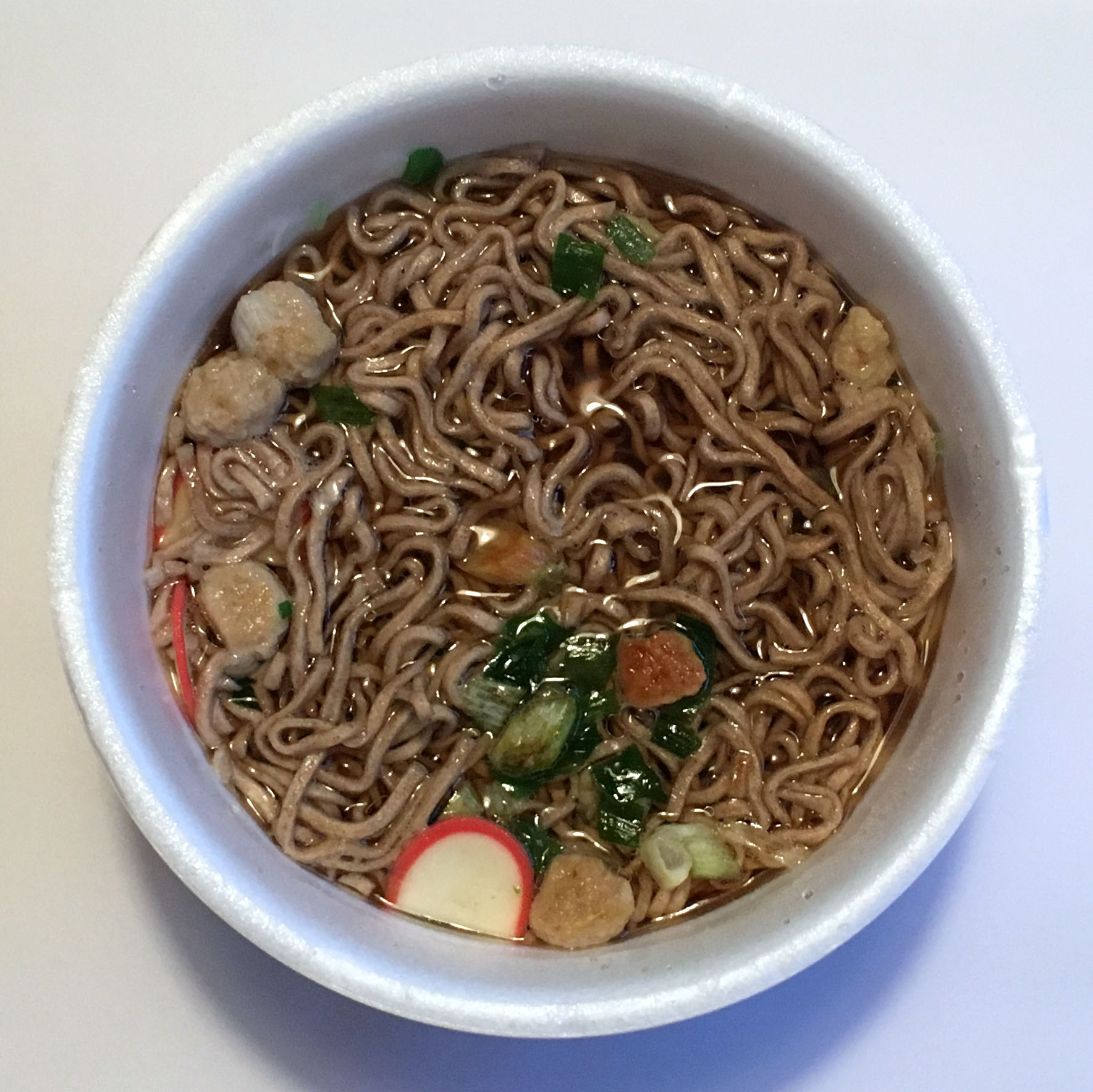
Maruchan instant soba noodles

Toyo Suisan Kaisha, Ltd of Tokyo, Japan, founded on March 28, 1953, is a consumer packaged foods company in Japan. Toyo Suisan's effort to become an international food company brought them to the United States, where, in 1972, they established Maruchan USA. At first, Maruchan USA was only a marketing company, importing and distributing ramen from Japan. After operating for five years as a distributor of imported products, Maruchan built its manufacturing facility in Irvine, California, in 1977, where it began producing Maruchan brand ramen. Since 1977 Maruchan has grown steadily and has become an industry leader in North America, alongside other instant noodle brands such as Top Ramen and Sapporo Ichiban.

== Name ==
Maruchan is a Japanese word composed of two parts, maru and chan. Maru means circle (Note: Wiktionary: 〇, 丸 (maru)), or round, as in the shape of a ball or a happy child's face. In Japanese, roundness has a connotation of friendliness. The honorific suffix chan is used affectionately for a child or as a term of endearment.

== See also ==
- List of instant noodle brands
