= Rollton =

Russian food brand

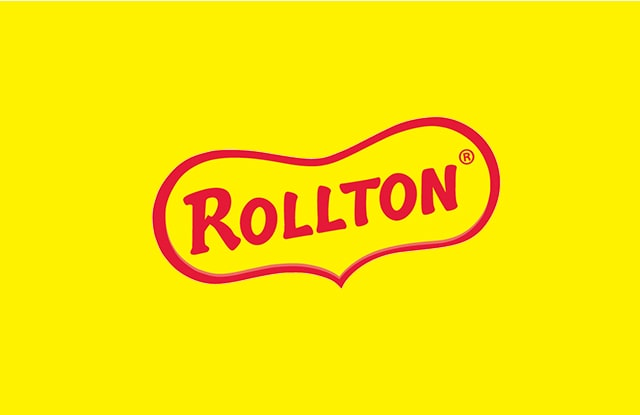

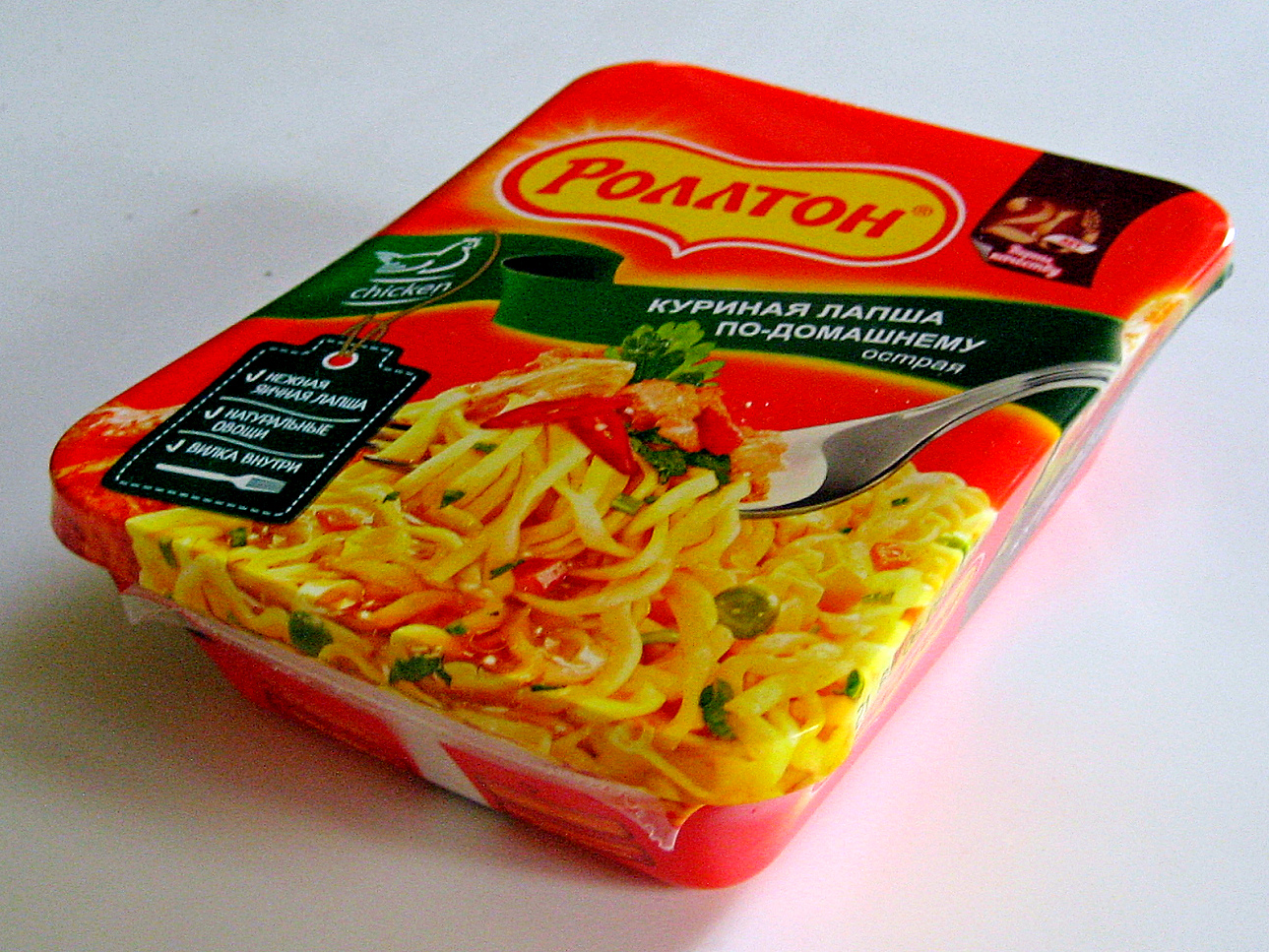
- Product type: Food industry
- Current owner: Mareven Food Central
- Country: Russia
- Introduced: 1999; 27 years ago
- Markets: Russia, CIS
- Website: www.rollton.ru

Rollton is a Russian food brand that produces instant noodles, traditional pasta, instant mashed potatoes, broth, side dishes and seasonings.

Founded in 1999, the brand sells low-cost instant food in Russia and the CIS. It belongs to Mareven Food Central, a part of the international Mareven Food Holdings group.

== History ==
Until 2007, products under the Rollton brand were manufactured by DHV-S CJSC. Since 2007, Rollton has been produced and sold by the legal successor of DHV-S CJSC, Mareven Food Central LLC. In 2018, a representative office of Mareven Food Central LLC was opened in Tashkent, Uzbekistan.

In 2016, construction of the Mareven Food Tien Shan pasta and semi-finished product plant began. In April 2018, the plant successfully launched a test production.

In 2019, noodle sales reached 1.752 billion rubles (about 60 million portioned packages).

In 2020, Rollton was recognized as a well-known trademark in Russia.

Production of products under the Rollton brand in 2021 is represented by three independent factories.

Mareven Food Central is the largest taxpayer in the Serpukhovsky District. The company takes part in the social life of the urban district of Serpukhov: it holds environmental campaigns and clean-up days, improves adjacent territories and recreation areas for citizens.
