= Koka (brand) =

Singaporean brand of instant noodles

Koka 可口
- Product type: Instant noodles
- Produced by: Tat Hui Foods Pte. Ltd.
- Country: Singapore
- Introduced: 1986
- Markets: Singapore; worldwide
- Website: www.kokanoodles.com

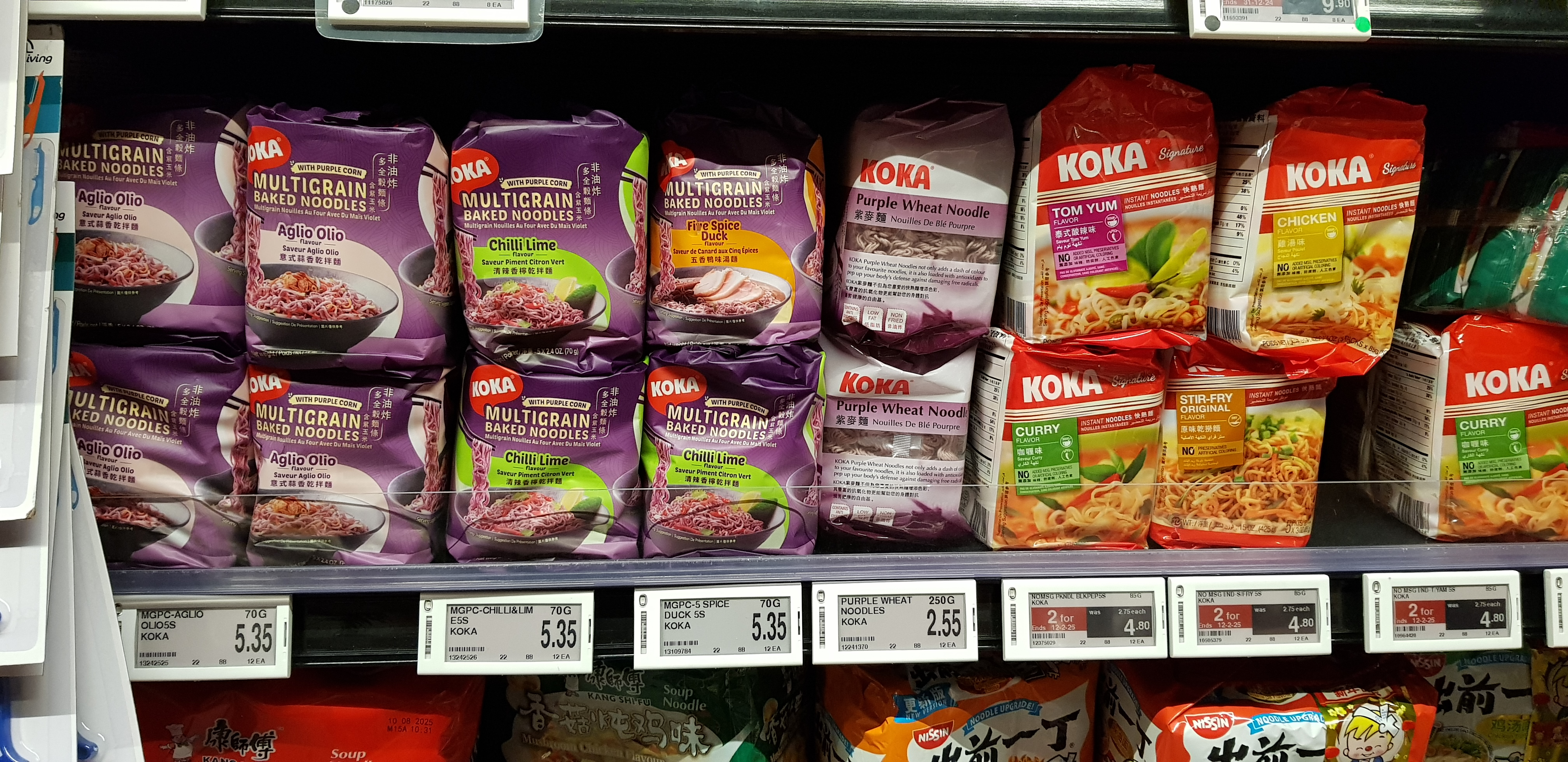
Koka Noodles for sale in Singapore, December 2024

Koka (可口) are a Singaporean brand of instant noodles. It is manufactured by Tat Hui Foods Pte. Ltd., a company founded in 1986. The noodles are available in a variety of flavours, as packets or cup noodles.

They are sold within Singapore, and since 1987, have been exported to markets worldwide. Along with the Sanwa noodle brand, Tat Hui exports over 100 million packets a year, and are a leading brand in Ireland, behind Unilever's Pot Noodle, where they are distributed by Boyne Valley Foods.

== Manufacturing ==
Koka's products are manufactured and packaged in Tat Hui's factory in Jurong, Singapore. Their noodles are air-dried rather than deep-fried in the usual Asian manner.

== Products ==
The KOKA Original line of noodle packets are produced in Chicken, Curry, Masala, Mi Goreng, Mushroom, Prawn, Spicy Stir-Fried, Tom Yum, Tomato, Vegetable and Beef flavours. KOKA Original noodle bowls are made in Mushroom, Chicken, Seafood, Tom Yum and Beef flavour. KOKA Original noodle cups come in Chicken & Corn, Mushroom, Curry, Seafood, Tom Yum, Vegetable, Beef, Chicken and Tomato.

KOKA also have a KOKA Signature (Authentic Singapore), KOKA delight (low-fat), KOKA Silk (gluten free) and KOKA Purple Wheat (Antioxidant) range of noodles.

KOKA Creamy Soup is a range of soups containing noodle croutons.

== See also ==
- List of instant noodle brands
