= Toyo Suisan =

Japanese food company

Toyo Suisan Kaisha, Ltd.

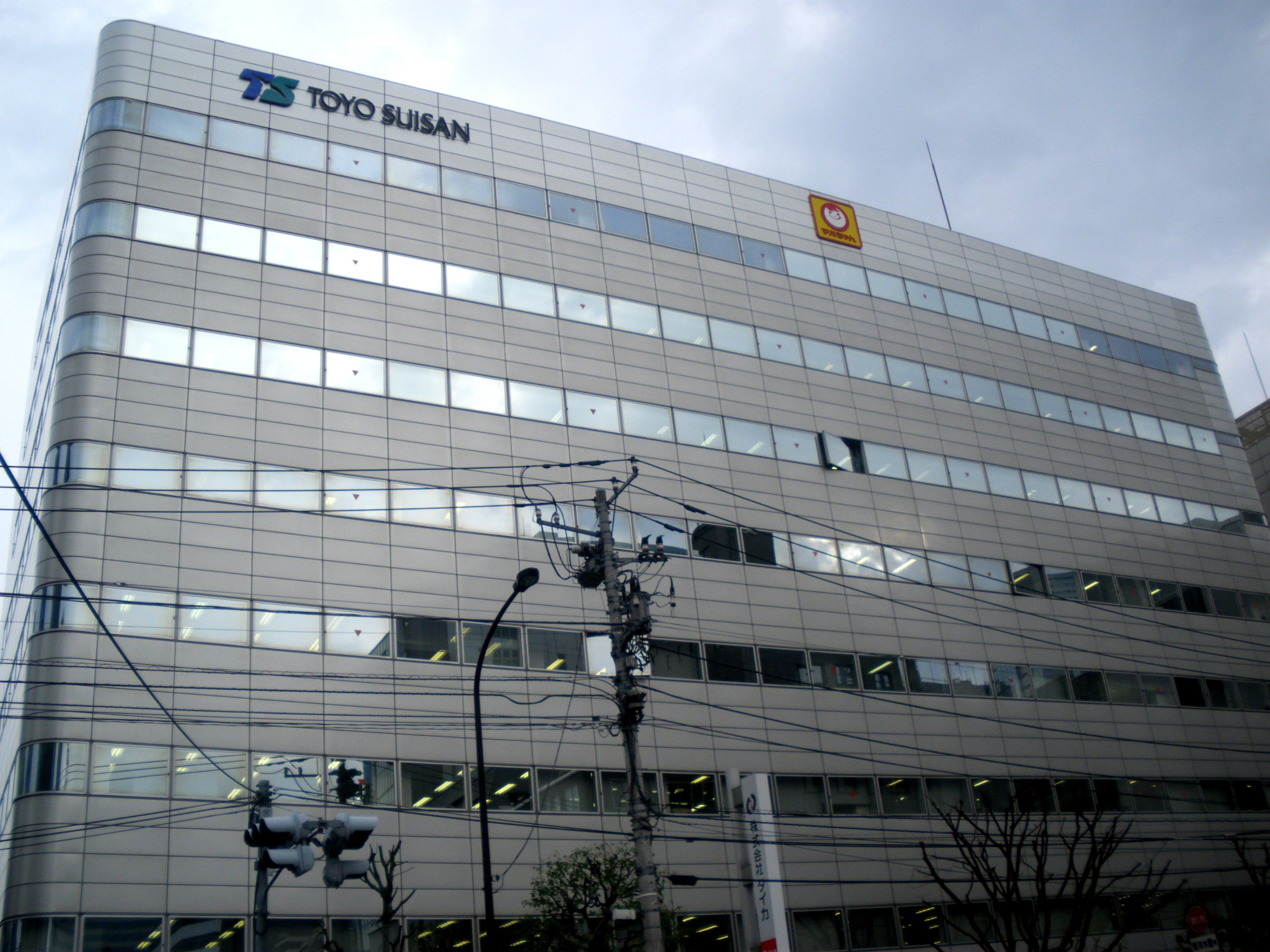
- The company's headquarters
- Native name: 東洋水産株式会社
- Company type: Public KK
- Traded as: TYO: 2875
- ISIN: JP3613000003
- Industry: Food processing
- Founded: March 25, 1953; 72 years ago
- Founder: Kazuo Mori
- Headquarters: Konan, Minato-ku, Tokyo 108-8501, Japan
- Area served: Worldwide
- Key people: Tadasu Tsutsumi (Chairman); Noritaka Sumimoto (President)
- Products: Seafood; Instant noodles; Frozen and chilled food
- Brands: Maruchan
- Revenue: ▲JPY 489 billion (FY 2023) (US$ 3.2 billion) (FY 2023)
- Net income: ▲JPY 66.7 billion (FY 2023) (US$ 440.7 million) (FY 2023)
- Number of employees: 4,738 (consolidated as of March 31, 2024)
- Website: Official website

Toyo Suisan Kaisha, Ltd. (東洋水産株式会社, Tōyō Suisan Kabushiki-gaisha), best known as Toyo Suisan (東洋水産, Tōyō Suisan), is a Japanese company specializing in ramen noodles, through its Maruchan brand, seafood and frozen and refrigerated foods. It is the fourth-largest transnational seafood corporation.

== History ==
The company was established in 1953 by Kazuo Mori as a marine products exporter, domestic buyer and distributor. Entering the cold-storage business in 1955, it began producing and selling such processed marine food products as fish sausage in 1956.

Toyo Suisan and its consolidated subsidiaries subsequently expanded operations into other business fields, including instant noodles, fresh noodles and frozen foods.

In addition to consumer-direct foods, the company also markets a diverse range of food products for the commercial food service industry, including restaurants, speciality stores and industrial food services.

== Operations ==
The company operates three solely owned companies in the United States: Maruchan, Inc. in Irvine, California, Maruchan Virginia, Inc. in Richmond, Virginia, and Maruchan Texas, Inc. in Von Ormy, Texas. They also have a joint venture with Ajinomoto Foods North America, Inc. in Portland, Oregon called Ajinomoto Toyo Frozen Noodles.

== Products ==
Instant Noodles: the series of Japanese instant cup noodles, represents one of the best-selling products, other products include: non-fried noodles, and vertical-type cup series of instant noodles

Fresh Noodles: Toyo Suisan’s fresh noodles command the top share of the fresh noodle market in Japan. Introduced in 1975, Sanshoku (“three pack”) Yakisoba are the top-selling fresh noodles in Japan. Sanshoku Udon noodles (shelf life 15 days), and Mukashi Nagara No Chuka Soba noodles, are among the other products.
