= Sarimi =

Indonesian instant noodle brand and former company

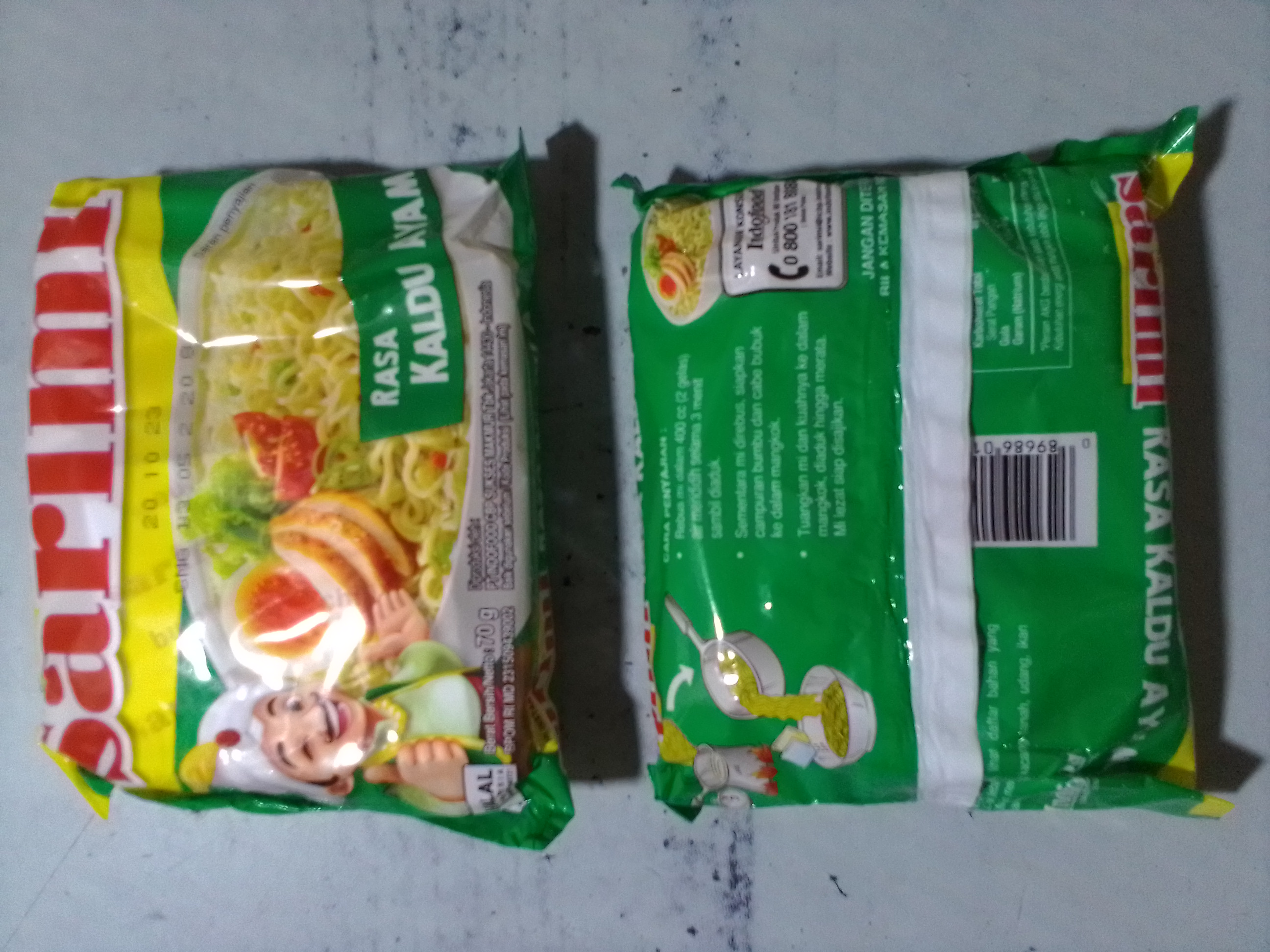
- Two packs of Sarimi Chicken broth flavor
- Product type: Instant noodles
- Produced by: Indofood
- Country: Indonesia
- Introduced: 1982
- Website: www.sarimi.co.id

Sarimi is an instant noodle brand in Indonesia, produced by Indofood.

== History ==
It was launched in 1982, ten years after the Indomie brand and was previously produced under the Salim Group. In Indonesia, the term "Sarimi" is also commonly used as a generic term that refers to instant noodles.
