= Hy (company) =

South Korean food company

hy Co., Ltd
- Native name: 주식회사 에치와이
- Company type: Subsidiary
- Industry: Food processing
- Founded: 27 July 1969
- Headquarters: 577 Gangnam-daero, Seocho-gu, Seoul, South Korea
- Key people: Yoon Deok-byeong (Co-founder), Yoon Ho-jung (CEO)
- Products: Dairy product Juice; Health Functional Food
- Owner: Paldo Co. Ltd.(40.83%); Yakult Honsha (38.30%)
- Number of employees: 1,030 as of 31 December 2020
- Parent: Paldo Co. Ltd.
- Subsidiaries: Paldo Co. Ltd. Vilac Co. Ltd.
- Website: www.hy.co.kr

hy Co., Ltd (Korean: 주식회사 에치와이) is a South Korean food company based in Seocho-gu, Seoul. It is one of the largest food companies in South Korea and produces beverages (including sikhye and sujeonggwa) and dairy products (including yakult, a yogurt-like drink).

== History ==
The Korean joint venture between Yoon Deok-byeong and Yakult Honsha was established on 27 November 1969 under the name 한국야쿠르트유업주식회사 (transl. Korea Yakult, Inc.)

The company created and started selling domestic yakult in 1971 to negative reception in the early days, due to the lack of knowledge regarding lactic acid bacteria. At the time, there was speculation about the product, due to popular belief that lactic acid was harmful to the body. Despite this, Yoon carried on with the sales, starting with an aggressive marketing campaign, including a "free tasting campaign" for the public, a door-to-door sales campaign by hiring housewives (who came to be known as Yakult Lady/auntie), who knew the local neighborhood and knew the locals. This marketing campaign resulted in a major success, with sales increasing to a million bottles sold per day by 1977.

In 1976, the company founded the Korea Yakult Research Institute, a research institute that is notable for researching and inventing the Bifidobacterium HY8001 probiotics/lactobacillus, resulting in South Korea depending much less on imports from the United States, Europe, Japan, and multiple countries for lactic acid products. The research institute also has a library of over 4,000 types of bifidobacterium strains, with 139 patent registrations and 56 patented strains, and has developed 22 lactobacilli for product application since its founding. It is the birthplace of multiple products that are sold by Korea Yakult.

In 1987 the company began distributing its products overseas, under the brand name Paldo. In 2012, Paldo Co. Ltd. was launched as an independent subsidiary of Korea Yakult.

In 2019, Korea Yakult changed the name of the "Yakult Lady" (야쿠르트 아줌마), which is a symbol of the company, to "Fresh Manager" (프레시 매니저) to mark the 50th anniversary of its foundation.

In 2021 March 29, Korea Yakult declared that they are renaming their business to hy, Ltd. due to their interest in expanding their portfolio in the distribution sector after a shareholder meeting the day before.

== See also ==
- Yakult Honsha, original Japanese joint venture investor that helped found the original Korea Yakult company
- Seoul Milk
