= Wai Wai (food brand) =

Thai brand of instant noodles

Wai Wai Instant Noodles
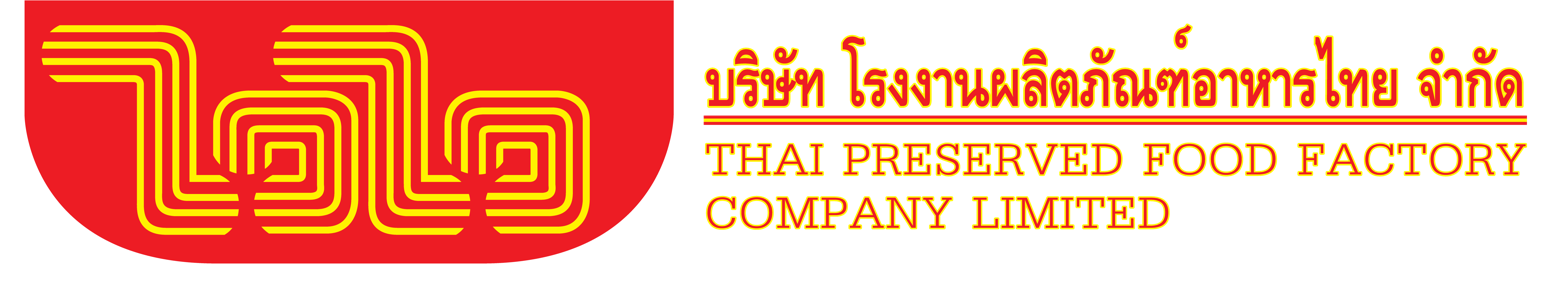
- Product type: Instant noodles
- Current owner: Chaudhary Group
- Produced by: Thai Preserved Food Factory Co., Ltd.
- Country: Thailand
- Introduced: 1972
- Markets: Worldwide
- Ambassador: Purnima Shrestha
- Tagline: ทำวันนี้ทำไวไว
- Website: waiwai.co.th

Wai Wai (Thai: ไวไว, romanized: Wịwị, pronounced [wāj wāj]) is a brand of instant noodles originating in Thailand.

The brand has been produced in Thailand since 1972 by Thai Preserved Food Factory Co., Ltd.

== History ==
Thai Preserved Food Factory Co. Ltd. was founded in Thailand in 1972 by Surin Napapruekchat and seven other families. The company's managing director since 1998 has been Pricha Napapruekchat, the eldest son of the founder.

== Operations ==
=== Thailand ===
TPFF has factories on 99 rai in tambons Om Yai and Rai Khing in the Sam Phran District of Nakhon Pathom Province and will build another in Ratchaburi.

TPFF posted revenues of 6.54 billion baht in 2017 and expects that number to rise to 10 billion baht within the next five to ten years. The company anticipates it growth of instant noodles will hit five percent in 2019, up from the average of 1–3% over the preceding three years.

=== Europe ===
Chaudhary Group opened its Serbian plant in 2017 to distribute the Wai Wai products into the European market.
