= Wheat Crunchies =

British crisp snack

Wheat Crunchies are a crisp wheat snack produced under the British snack producer KP Snacks Ltd. They come in several flavours including Spicy Tomato, Crispy Bacon and Cheddar & Onion. A regular multipack bag contains 20g and a normal retail pack contains 30g.

== History ==
Sooner Snacks, manufacturers of products like Riley's Crisps and Nik Naks, were purchased by Rowntree Mackintosh in 1982.

Under Rowntree Mackintosh ownership, Sooner's developed and launched Wheat Crunchies in 1987. (Note: This is the official date from the current manufacturer, KP Snacks, however as per evidence in the talk page, Wheat Crunchies seemed to exist in the 1970s)

In February 1992, Sooner Snacks was bought from Borden Inc. by Dalgety plc, with the company being absorbed into Golden Wonder. In 1995, Golden Wonder underwent a management buyout costing £54.6 million. In 2000, Bridgepoint Capital acquired Golden Wonder for £156 million. It was subsequently sold to United Biscuits in 2006, following the take-over of Golden Wonder by Tayto, and merged into KP Snacks. In December 2012 KP Snacks was sold to Intersnack.

=== Re-launch ===
In June 2012, United Biscuits re-launched Wheat Crunchies with a new logo, 'improved taste', a new Cheddar & Onion flavour, and a bigger snack size.

== Health information ==
The packet promises that the product is free from any artificial colours or flavours and contains no MSG. An average 25g multipack packet contains: Energy (kj)- 516, (kcal)- 123, Protein- 2.4g, Carbohydrate- 14.4g, of which sugars- 0.7g, Fat- 6.3g, of which saturates- 0.9g, Fibre- 0.8g, Sodium- 0.2g

== See also ==
- List of brand name snack foods
