= Red Mill (snack food manufacturer) =

British snack food manufacturer

- Industry: Confectionary
- Headquarters: Britain
- Owner: Tayto (Northern Ireland)

Red Mill is a British-based snack food manufacturer. They mainly produce corn snacks, including Tangy Toms, Onion Rings, Oinks, Quarterbacks, Salt and Vinegar Savoury Sticks and Bacon Rashers. Other products include Mr. Porky's Pork Scratchings, which are suitable for those on an Atkin's diet.

It was announced on 14 March 2008, that Red Mill was to be acquired by Tayto (Northern Ireland).

Most of the Red Mill snacks now carry the Golden Wonder name.
