= Pot Noodle =

Brand of instant noodle snack foods

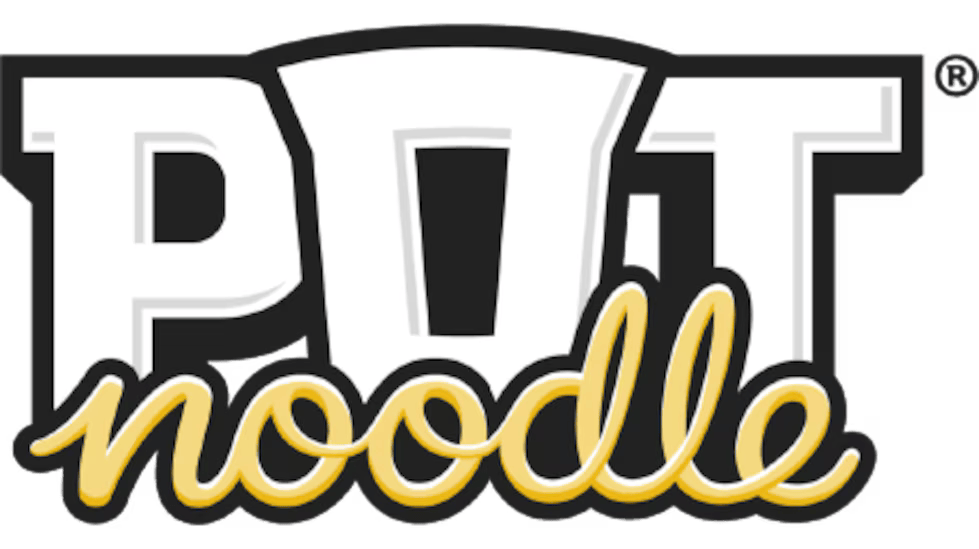

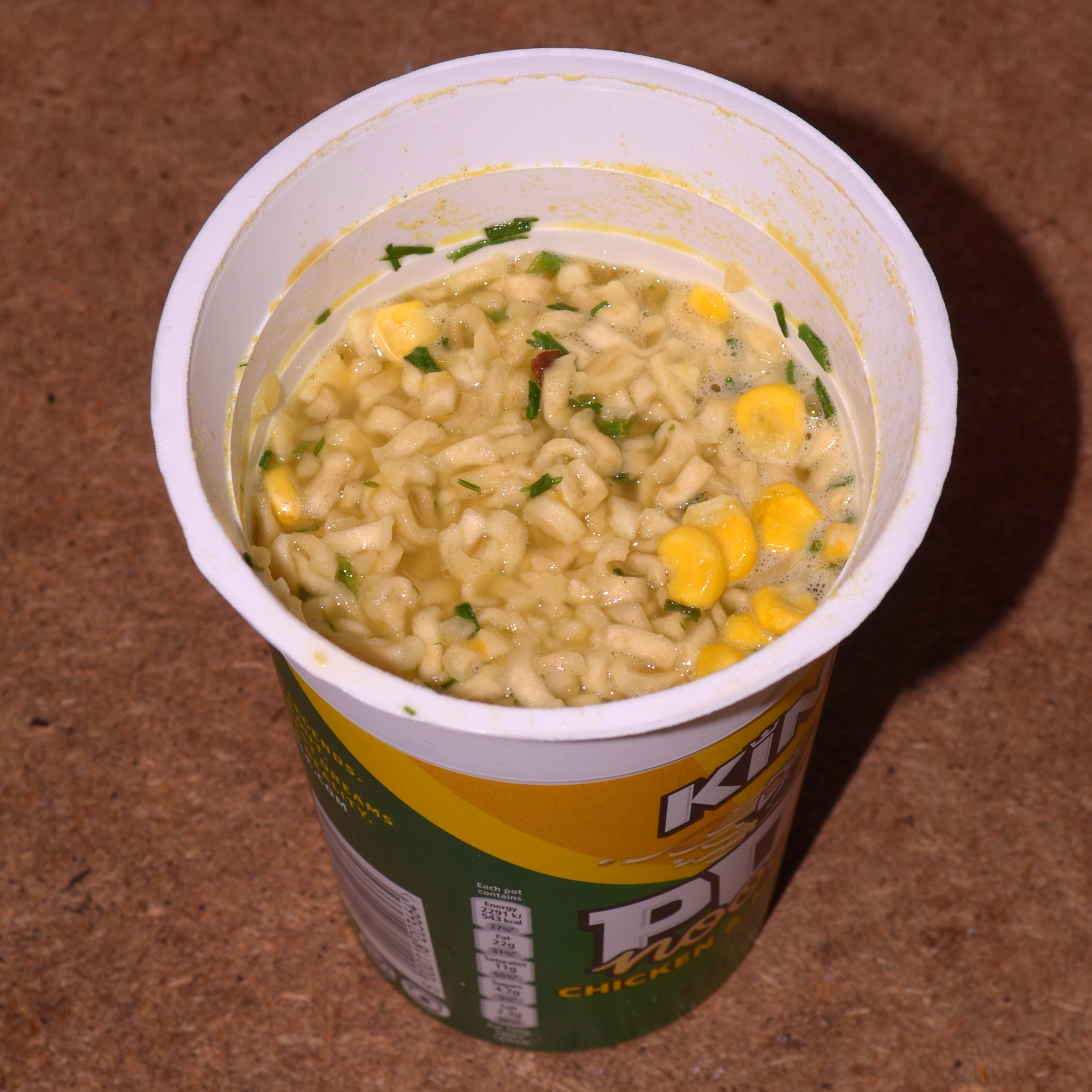
- Chicken and mushroom flavour Pot Noodle made up according to instructions
- Product type: Instant noodles
- Current owner: Unilever
- Produced by: Croespenmaen, near Crumlin, Caerphilly, Wales
- Country: United Kingdom
- Introduced: 1977; 49 years ago
- Previous owners: Golden Wonder
- Website: potnoodle.com

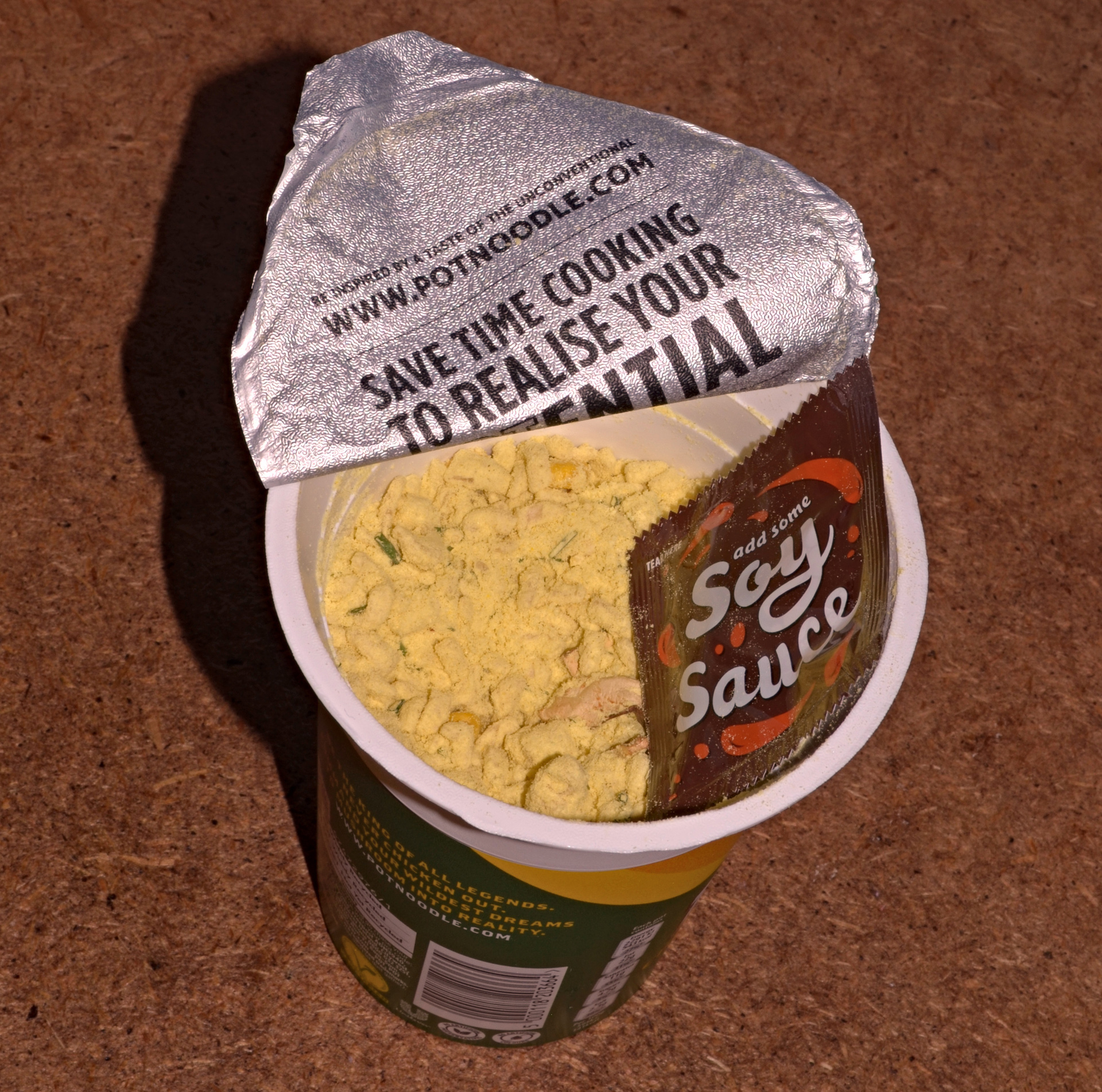
Chicken and mushroom flavour "King" (large) Pot Noodle before boiling water and soy sauce sachet added

Pot Noodle is a brand of instant noodle snack foods from the United Kingdom, available in a selection of flavours and varieties. This dehydrated food consists of noodles, assorted dried vegetables and flavouring powder. It is prepared by adding boiling water, which rapidly softens the noodles and dissolves the powdered sauce.

The product is packaged in a plastic pot, from which the prepared noodles can be eaten. Many pots contain a sachet of sauce, such as soy sauce or hot sauce.

Certain flavours of Pot Noodle have "King" variants, which are large versions of the same flavour.

== History ==
Instant noodles were originally invented in 1958 by Momofuku Ando, and Cup Noodles developed by his company Nissin Food Products in 1971.

Golden Wonder launched the Pot Noodle brand in the United Kingdom in 1977.

It was launched in December 1977 in some parts of UK, after being tested in the Granada ITV region since October 1977, costing 32p. Production could not keep up with the demand. In late October 1979 it was sold nationally, with Beef and Tomato, Chicken and Mushroom, and Spicy Curry, being made by Golden Wonder in Corby in Northamptonshire.

=== Unilever ===
In July 1995, Best Foods, which produces Hellmanns mayonnaise, paid then owner Dalgety plc $280 million for its Golden Wonder Pot Noodle instant hot snacks manufacturing business. CPC bought it for £180m.

Bestfoods, known as CPC international before 1997, was itself acquired by Unilever in June 2000. Unilever kept the Pot Noodle brand and its sole production factory, after it sold the rest of the Golden Wonder business in January 2006 to Tayto. In the same year, Unilever relaunched the brand, introduced three new varieties and reduced salt levels by 50 per cent. Golden Wonder later established another line of pot noodles called The Nation's Noodle (renamed Noodle Pot in 2016) in direct competition with their former brand.

== Production ==
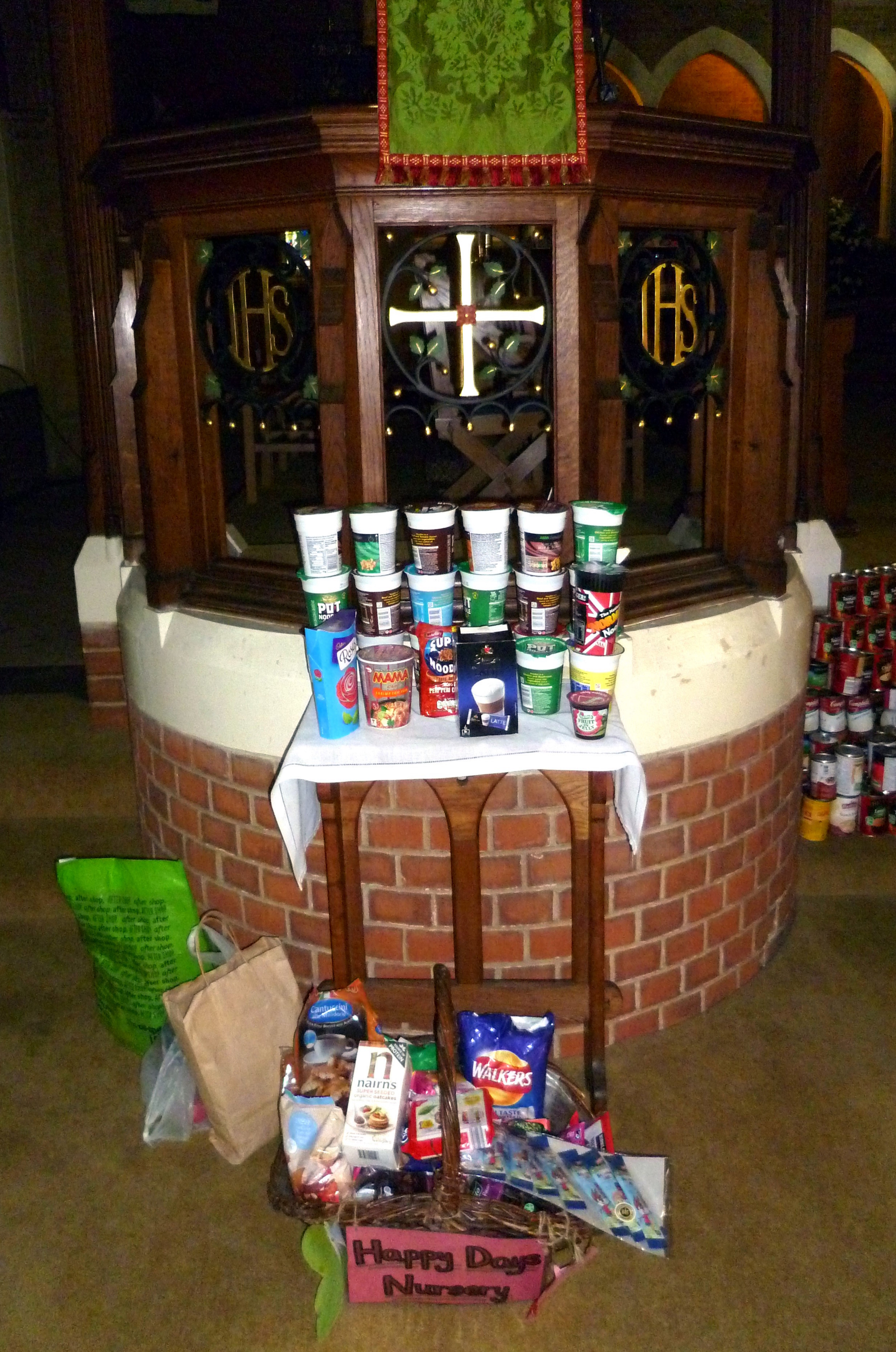
Pot Noodle harvest festival offerings, St Andrew's Southgate, London

In September 1989 a fire destroyed the main Corby factory. Golden Wonder had been in Corby since 1969, with another factory in Widnes, with the head office in Market Harborough in Leicestershire. The company bought the Scunthorpe site in February 1992.

Pot Noodles are manufactured in Croespenmaen, near Crumlin, Caerphilly, Wales, which became the topic of an advertising campaign of 2006, showing fictitious Pot Noodle mines in Wales. The factory typically produces 175 million pots annually.

Around 2006, Pot Noodle's recipe was changed to make the product healthier. This mostly involved cutting down on the amount of salt in the product. A "GTi" variant, prepared in a microwave instead of adding boiling water, was introduced at the end of the 2000s and was the first Pot Noodle to contain real meat. In 2007, 2014, and 2023, the brand changed their logo.

Pot Noodle has often given promotional gifts away, including a 'horn' and a 'spinning fork.' During the 2008 Edinburgh Festival Fringe, Unilever sponsored a musical directed by David Sant, and created by advertising agency Mother, set in a Pot Noodle factory.

As part of a sustainability commitment by Pot Noodle's parent company, Unilever, half of the Pot Noodle range and roughly 80% of the most popular flavours will switch to paper pots rather than plastic pots.

== Controversies ==
The Pot Noodle brand has been involved in a number of controversial advertising campaigns.

In 1993, the Computer Graphic advertisement was banned after reports it caused epileptic seizures in viewers.

In January 2002, Irish politician Michael Ring TD, branded a Pot Noodle animated television advertisement as glorifying child neglect and demanded it be banned. The advertisement featured a young boy whose tongue was stuck to a frozen climbing frame. A supervisor went to get a sponge and boil a kettle of water to help free the child's tongue but was distracted and instead used the hot water to make a Pot Noodle. Ring said "the manufacturers have a responsibility to the public not to encourage youngsters to lick frozen pipes or suggest that adults should neglect a suffering child".

In August 2002, a series of television adverts that described Pot Noodle as "the slag of all snacks" was withdrawn after complaints to the Independent Television Commission. The related poster campaign, revolving around the "Hot Noodle" range with a tagline of "hurt me, you slag" was withdrawn by Unilever after the Advertising Standards Authority (ASA) upheld complaints that "the tone could be interpreted as condoning violence".

In May 2005, ASA received 620 complaints, about a series of advertisements featuring a man with a large brass horn in his trousers, with the suggestive slogan "Have you got the Pot Noodle horn?" Some of the complaints described them as "tasteless and offensive." The three advertisements had been already approved for restricted times, primarily after the 9:00pm watershed. The ASA did not uphold the complaints. While it accepted the campaign was "a little crude," they deemed it harmless and said that "the timing restriction was appropriate."

In 2006 ASA received 81 complaints over a Pot Noodle advert that featured "Welsh miners" digging for Pot Noodles. The complaints claimed that the advert was racist and made light of the hard conditions Welsh miners worked under. ASA rejected the claims that the advert was offensive. In September 2006, an article headed "Teach Pot Noodle teens to cook" in Dublin's Sunday Independent newspaper, Cavan chef Nevin Maguire on a recent school visit was shocked "to see 60 per cent of Leaving Cert students had Pot Noodle for their lunch". Maguire, along with other celebrity chefs called for compulsory cookery lessons in Ireland's schools for a "new generation that thinks 'food comes in a box'".

== List of flavours ==
=== Core range ===
- Beef & Tomato
- Chicken & Mushroom
- Original Curry
- Sweet & Sour
- Bombay Bad Boy
- Chinese Chow Mein

=== Limited edition ===
- Doner Kebab
- Peri Peri Chicken
- Turkey & Stuffing
- Sticky Rib
- Flame Grilled Steak
- Chicken Fajita

=== Discontinued ===
- Chilli Beef
- Brazilian BBQ Steak
- Jamaican Jerk
- Cheese & Tomato
- Lamb & Mint
- Chicken Satay
- Katsu Curry
- Spicy Curry
- Sweet and Spicy
- Thai Green Curry
- Southern Fried Chicken
- Seedy Sanchez Mexican Fajita
- Spaghetti Bolognese
- Chicken Korma
- Chicken Tikka
- Mac & Cheese
- Sausage Casserole

== Related products ==
Golden Wonder introduced a similar convenience food, "Pot Rice", at the beginning of the 1980s. Pot Rice was made from dehydrated rice, wheat protein, vegetables, and flavourings, sold in a plastic pot. Pot Rice was later manufactured by Unilever and Knorr when the Pot Noodle brand went through a series of acquisitions and takeovers in the 1990s.

Posh Noodle was a variation on the typical pot noodle, consisting of thinner, ramen like noodles and available in three Asian themed flavours, launched in 2003.

Pot Rice was discontinued at the beginning of the 2000s. Flavours included "Chicken Risotto", "Chicken Curry", "Beef & Tomato" and "Savoury Beef". The brand received a limited relaunch in 2018. "Pot Mash" was a similar branded mashed potato snack, sold by the makers of Pot Noodle in the United Kingdom and Ireland at the end of the 1990s.

"Pot Casserole" consisting of dried vegetables and soya protein was introduced during the 1980s, but discontinued before the turn of the century. "Pot Pasta" and "Pot Spaghetti" combined dried pasta pieces with a sachet of Parmesan, and was available for some time in the 1990s. However, in 2017, Pot Pasta was relaunched, with the sachets removed. "Pot Sweet" was a dessert range available in four varieties, introduced in the mid-1980s, and discontinued shortly afterwards.

In 2020, Lost the Pot Noodle, instant noodles in loose plastic packaging instead of a plastic pot, was launched in 3 flavours: curry, roast chicken and sweet chilli.

From August 2021, Pot Noodle launched another new range of pots, titled 'Pot Noodle Fusions'. This range hearkened back to earlier ranges like 'Posh Noodle' and 'Asian Street Style' with more exotic world food flavours including Chilli Chicken, Katsu Curry and the previously available Thai Green Curry flavours, as a partial rebrand and partial new launch.

== See also ==
- Ramen
- List of instant noodle brands
- Indomie
- Maggi instant noodles
- Nissin Foods
- Sapporo Ichiban
- Shin Ramyun
- Super Noodles
- Wai Wai (food brand)
