= Real Crisps =

British brand of potato crisps

Real Crisps (often stylized as REAL Crisps) is a crisp (potato chip) brand. The company was founded in 1997, and expanded over the following decade to become a business turning over £15 million a year.

In 2007, the brand was purchased by the Northern Ireland-based crisp manufacturer Tayto. In 2012, a fire caused the destruction of the 65,000 square feet (6,000 m^{2}) Real Crisp factory in Crumlin, Caerphilly. There are a range of flavours produced, and the company ran a limited edition political themed range prior to the 2010 United Kingdom general election.

== History ==
Real Crisps was founded in 1997, with the intention of manufacturing hand-cooked potato chip (crisps) for independent retailers and pubs. After a financial investment in 1999, the company changed its name to become Sirhowy Valley Foods, while maintaining Real Crisps as the brand name of the lead product.

In August 2005, Real Crisps moved into a new factory in Crumlin, Caerphilly. The new factory, measuring 65,000 square feet (6,000 m^{2}), increased the production capacity by 50 percent. This enabled the 90 staff to produce 37,000 cases of crisps per week. The move was due to demand outstripping the ability to supply at the previous location in Cwmfelinfach. At this point, Real Crisps were the second biggest company behind Kettle Foods in the hand-cooked crisp market within the UK. It had seen turnover increase from £1.3 million in 2001/2 to £5.3 million during 2003/4.

The Northern Ireland-based crisp manufacturer Tayto purchased Sirhowy Valley Foods in 2007. Contracts had been arranged with British supermarket chains Tesco, Asda and Sainsbury's, taking the turnover of the company to £15 million in a year. Following this, and Tayto's acquisition of Golden Wonder previously, they became the third biggest crisp manufacturer in the UK. That same year, Real Crisps began to export to France.

=== 2012 factory fire ===
In September 2012, employee Colin Goulding flicked a lit cigarette inside the Real Crisps factory building in Crumlin. This ignited the 60,000 litres (13,000 imp gal) of cooking oil stored in the building. The 20 staff inside, including both Goulding's parents, were evacuated by 60 firefighters who fought the blaze. The factory was rendered unusable. Staff were offered jobs at Tayto factories in Ireland and England, but few were able to take up those posts and so around 80 jobs were lost as a result of the fire. Goulding was charged with arson, and pleaded guilty. At Cardiff Crown Court in January 2014, he was sentenced to six years and three months in custody. At sentencing, it was revealed that Goulding had the mental capacity of a 14-year old, and the sentencing judge accepted that he had not meant to cause the fire.

== Products ==
Regular flavours include Sea Salted, Sea Salt & Vinegar, Strong Cheese & Onion and Roast Ox - Jalapeño Pepper has been discontinued, and replaced with Chicken Peri Peri. The packets use a frosted greaseproof material, and feature jokes in the design such as the phrase "We don't cut corners. If you find a corner in your packet, let us know." Each flavour has a different character on the bag; for example the Strong Cheese and Spring Onion flavour has a rugby player on the bag.

In the run up to the 2010 United Kingdom general election, limited edition versions of Sea Salted flavour Real Crisps were released in the colours of the Conservative Party, Labour Party, and Liberal Democrats. The idea was that supporters of each party would only buy the relevant coloured bags, giving an impression of the number of voters for each party. However, this caused an outcry from Plaid Cymru supporters as they were not represented.
