= Nik Naks (British snack) =

Type of extruded corn snack

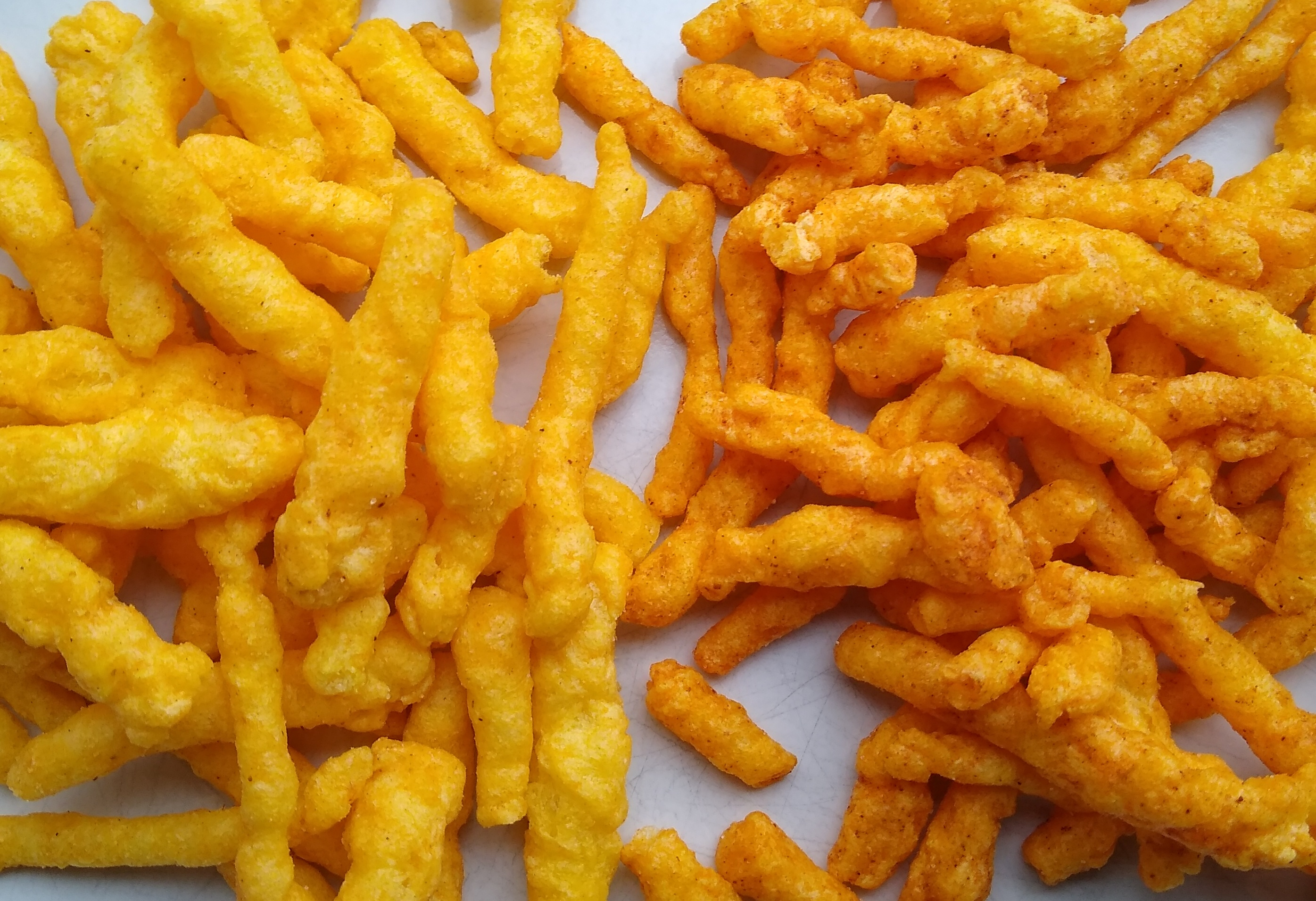
- Two flavours of Nik Naks: "Nice 'n' Spicy" (left) and "Rib 'n' Saucy" (right)
- Product type: Corn snack
- Current owner: KP Snacks
- Country: United Kingdom
- Introduced: 1982
- Markets: United Kingdom
- Previous owners: Rowntree's, Sooner Snacks, Golden Wonder, United Biscuits
- Tagline: 'Eat The Freak'

Nik Naks are a type of extruded corn snack previously manufactured by Sooner Snacks in Scunthorpe, England. The snack was introduced in 1982. The brand owner Sooner Snacks was purchased by Golden Wonder owner Dalgety plc in 1992 and then sold to United Biscuits in 2006. In December 2012, United Biscuits agreed to sell the KP Snacks brand, including Nik Naks, to the European Intersnack group. As of 2021, Nik Naks are made in three flavours (all of the format "X 'n' Y") with different colour packaging for each.

== Flavours ==
The original flavour when Nik Naks first appeared was Cream 'n' Cheesy (Yellow bag).

They are now available in four flavours:

- Nice 'n' Spicy (Orange bag)
- Rib 'n' Saucy (Purple bag)
- Scampi 'n' Lemon (Green bag)
- Tangy 'n' Cheesy (Yellow bag)

The packaging design for the three different flavours of Nik Naks in a multipack, 2017

In the mid 1990s, the flavours were Nice 'n' Spicy, Cream 'n' Cheesy, Scampi 'n' Lemon and Rib 'n' Saucy. A tomato flavoured edition was also briefly sold. The packaging of the Scampi 'n' Lemon contained an ironic "Stifle The Stink" statement encouraging consumers to bin the packaging responsibly, however Rib 'n' Saucy ultimately replaced Scampi 'n' Lemon in order to remove any stigma about the flavour; sales of Nik Naks grew by 32% once the "smelly" flavour was removed. At some point a Hard Cheese flavour was introduced and later discontinued.

On Valentine's Day 1994, Golden Wonder released limited edition Naughty 'n' Saucy flavour Nik Naks (and for a limited time a Tomato and Mayonnaise flavour) containing an "aphrodisiac" ingredient (0.01% Guarana Seed extract.). This experiment was repeated in 2005, when they launched a new limited edition Naughty 'n' Saucy flavour including what was "claimed to be the first savoury snack to contain the Chinese herb Ginseng, said to help boost the libido"

Scampi 'n' Lemon made a comeback in 2002, just before being sold to KP and United Biscuits. The Scampi 'n' Lemon then replaced the Cream 'n' Cheesy flavour in multipacks from 2006. From 2008, the Scampi 'n' Lemon flavour was phased out to make room for the new Pickle 'n' Onion flavour. However, Scampi 'n' Lemon remains in multipacks. Pickle 'n' Onion flavour has since been discontinued.

Despite its name, Scampi 'n' Lemon flavour Nik Naks has never contained fish or animal products. Since its relaunch in 2018, the product is suitable for both vegetarians and vegans.

In June 2025, Nik Naks relaunched the cheese flavour as Tangy 'n' Cheesy.

== Advertising ==
The brand ran a notable advertising campaign in the '90s created by animator Bill Plympton, based on his short film Push Comes to Shove, in which two men's heads transform into a variety of shapes. This was subsequently followed up by 5 second adverts describing how ugly the snack was versus how great it tasted. In 1993, the brand ran an instant win promotion giving away rubbish. Such things as tummy fluff, a 2p piece and bits of string were given away.

During 2004–5, its advertising led with the tag line 'Eat the Freak', coined due to their odd appearance. One commercial, set on a cross-Channel ferry, was a modern parody of the sci-fi classic Alien, wherein a passenger eats a Nik Nak only to have it explode from his stomach and begin dancing to "Le Freak" by Chic. This advertisement was controversial, with over 80 complaints referencing the advertisement. It was later edited.

=== Branding dispute ===
In 2014, the UK brand of Nik Naks was involved in a copyright and branding dispute with the South African brand of the same name, NikNaks, manufactured by Simba Chips. KP Snacks informed importers of the South African brand into the United Kingdom to stop all imports due to the same name the two different products share.

== See also ==
- List of brand name snack foods
- Cheetos
