= Sooner Snacks =

Former British snack food company

Sooner Snacks Limited
- Industry: Food
- Founded: 1947; 79 years ago in Scunthorpe, England
- Founders: Alfred Riley
- Fate: Initially purchased by Rowntree Mackintosh in 1982, the business was sold to Borden Inc. in 1988, before finally being purchased by Dalgety plc in 1992 and eventually merged into Golden Wonder
- Headquarters: Scunthorpe, United Kingdom
- Products: Snack foods, potato chips

Sooner Snacks was a British snack manufacturer based in Scunthorpe, England. The business started in 1947 as Riley's Crisps, becoming one of the top five manufacturers of crisps and snacks in the United Kingdom by the 1980s. The business was eventually assimilated into Golden Wonder by then owners Dalgety plc during the 1990s. Several of the company's brands are still manufactured today, with Nik Naks and Wheat Crunchies made by former competitor, KP Snacks.

== History ==
=== Riley's Potato Crisps ===
In 1947, Alfred "Biff" Riley quit his job as an electrician at Redbourn steelworks to set up his own crisp company in a converted stable behind a terrace house in Allenby Street. Riley had experience of frying, as his father Bill ran three fish and chip shops across Scunthorpe and he had worked in the stores during World War II. At the time, Britain was still affected by rationing and only had one major crisp brand, Smiths Crisps. Riley employed four women to assist him, and by 1949 they were producing 100 tins of crisps a day, with his brother Dennis joining the business. The company was affected by the Korean War, with the rationing of vegetable oil for two years. While other food manufacturers closed down because of the rationing, Riley's expanded into the row of terraced houses in Allenby Street. However, neighbours complained about the noise and smell, but Scunthorpe Borough Council found a compromise by offering Riley's a new location, which became their home at Colin Road. By 1963, Riley's Crisps could be had in Plain (ready salted) and Cheese flavours. In 1963, Riley's purchased the Botanical Brewery of T Brumpton, of West Street, Scunthorpe, that operated a bar and a home delivery service, manufacturing a wide range of temperance drinks, including stone ginger beer, herb beer, hop ale, lemonade, sarsaparilla and dandelion and burdock stout. However the business was closed in 1977.

By 1972, the company had become a multi-million pound company. In the same year Riley's niece's husband, Bob Curgenven, joined the firm after completing a degree at University of Cambridge, initially as a placement for his studies to achieve a Doctorate, but would stay on to become the sales director at the age of 23. The company modernised its packaging in 1976, with the introduction of Shorko SCC polypropylene film flex manufactured by Coldense, with the business being able to pack 50 bags a minute. The company initially changed their name to RPC Foods, before becoming Sooner Foods in 1981. To celebrate Charles, Prince of Wales marriage to Diana, Princess of Wales, Sooner made the biggest bag of crisps ever created, measuring 119 ft 4 1/2 inches in length. In the same year, Curgenven lead a £3 million plus deal to purchase the business, becoming its chairman.

=== Rowntree Mackintosh take-over ===
In June the following year, Rowntree Mackintosh purchased 90% of the business in a deal worth £13.5 million as part of its plan to diversify. Curgenven retained 10% of the shareholding and continued in the position as chairman, but two years later he left the business.

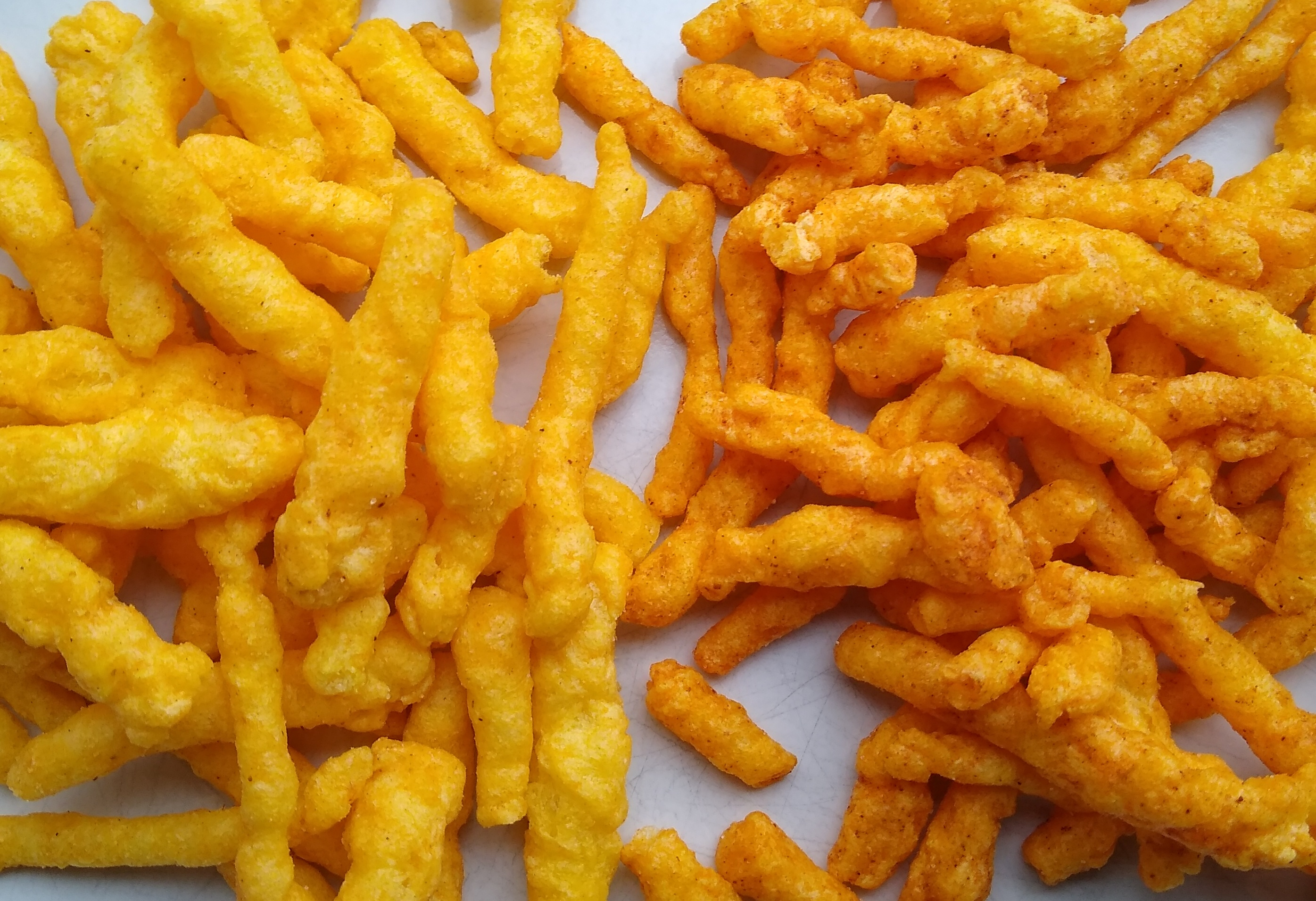
Two flavours of Nik Naks: "Nice 'n' Spicy" (left) and "Rib 'n' Saucy" (right)

Also in 1982, Sooner's launched a new extruded corn snack, Nik Naks. By 1985, the company had grown its turnover by 13%. The business continued to grow and by 1986, the company had seen an 8% growth in sales volumes, capturing 7% of the crisp market, and sitting behind Walkers, KP, Golden Wonder and Smiths. The company employed 1,750 people and was the town's second largest employer behind Scunthorpe Steelworks. In 1987, the company launched another of its renowned products, Wheat Crunchies, (Note: This is the official date from the current manufacturer, KP Snacks, however as per evidence in the talk page, Wheat Crunchies seemed to exist in the 1970s) however it announced sales were down due to increased competition. In October 1987, the company was named Rowntree Snack Foods Ltd.

=== The Americans arrive ===
Rowntree Mackintosh announced in January 1988 that they would be pulling out of the crisp and snack market, with sales not only at Sooner down, but also a £1 million reduction at its US division Tom's Foods. The business was sold to US food producer Borden Inc. in April 1988 for a fee of £43 million with the business being renamed Sooner Snacks in May. Sooner's sales at this time were reportedly $75 million a year. This was Borden's first investment in the UK snack market, and stated Sooner would remain a standalone business. During 1988, Sooner's won the Golden Bull award from the Plain English Campaign, awarded for doubletalk and jargon. It was given for the company's response to a letter from a customer asking why their crisps were purple. The response read:

Potato Varieties with pigmented skins owe their colour to anthrocyians dissolved in the cell sap of the periderm and cells of the peripheral cortex.... It is difficult to say whether this is due to a process of active migration of the anthrocyian from the periderm and cortex or to the primary protection within the flesh of the tubar.

In 1990, Sooner announced lower sales due to increased competition and weak demand, and the factory was modernised and refurbished. Sooner Snacks announced in December 1990, that they had a turnover of £57 million with pre-tax profits of £3.9 million. The effects of the British recession which caused weak demand for snacks lead to the company making 400 people redundant in 1991.

=== Swallowed by the competition ===
By February 1992, Sooner Snacks was sold by Borden to Dalgety plc for £30 million plus a £14 million loan repayment. Sooner was absorbed into Golden Wonder, creating a business that had a combined turnover of £300 million and 20% of the market. Sooner had its own fleet of vans and depots, selling its snack products to independent shops and pubs, which Dalgety saw could be expanded by offering Golden Wonder products.

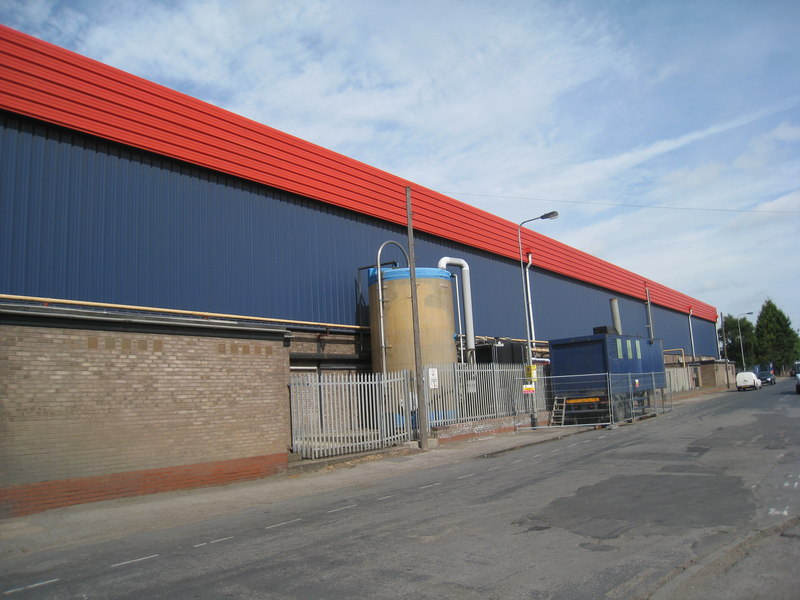
Side of the Golden Wonder factory, Colin Road, Scunthorpe

The factory is still operational under Golden Wonder, and in 2016 was visited by a 94 year old Biff Riley.

== Products ==
Sooners and its predecessor, Riley's produced a variety of products over its lifetime. The list contains products that may have not been produced at the same time:

- Riley's Crisps, by 1986 the range included 12 flavours. Riley's were known for some unusual flavours including New Potato with Mint Sauce and Grouse.
- Murphy Crisps, by 1986 the range included 10 flavours. This included the unusual flavour Roast Ox.
- Murphy Club Crisps, a potato crisp.
- Murphy Pub Crisps, a potato crisp.
- Murphy Nuts, including salted and dry roasted.
- Murphy Fruit & Nut Cocktail.
- Nik Naks, an extruded corn snack launched in 1982. The snack is now manufactured by KP Snacks.
- Wheat Crunchies, a crisp wheat snack launched in 1987. The snack is now manufactured by KP Snacks.
- Rounders, an extruded corn snack in the shape of a ball.
- Crunchy Frys, potato and corn snack.
- Champs, an extruded corn snack in a claw shape.
- Jaws, an extruded corn snack.
- Seyshells
- Primes Crisps, a potato crisp.
- Thundercats, a potato snack.
- The Real Ghostbusters, a potato and corn snack.
- Groovers, a crinkle cut potato crisp.
- King Cut Groovers, a crinkle cut potato crisp.
- Bumpkins, an extruded corn snack.
- Harvest Rings, a rye and wheat snack.
- Frozen pastry products, including puff, shortcrust and wholemeal.
- Botanical Brewery (T Brumpton), temperance drinks including stone ginger beer, herb beer, hop ale, lemonade, sarsaparilla and dandelion and burdock stout.
