= The Nation's Noodle =

British brand of instant noodles

- Product type: Instant noodle
- Current owner: Symington's (Golden Wonder)
- Country: United Kingdom
- Introduced: 3 August 2009
- Website: Official website at the Wayback Machine (archived 2015-03-31)

The Nation's Noodle was a brand of instant noodle snack foods from United Kingdom, available in a selection of flavors and varieties.

== History ==
The product was launched in the United Kingdom on 3 August 2009, by Symington's, using the Golden Wonder name. Golden Wonder themselves had previously developed and owned UK-market leading brand Pot Noodle, now owned by Unilever.

== Current UK flavours ==
- All Day Breakfast (The Nation's Noodle)
- Chicken and Mushroom (The Nation's Noodle)
- Beef & Tomato (The Nation's Noodle)
- Chip Shop Curry (The Nation's Noodle)
- Inferno Chilli (The Nation's Noodle)
- Spicy Tomato (The Nation's Pasta)
- Spaghetti Bolognese (The Nation's Pasta)
- Macaroni Cheese (The Nation's Pasta)

== See also ==
- List of instant noodle brands
