= Tayto (Northern Ireland) =

Manufacturer of crisps and corn snacks

Tayto Group Limited
- Logo since 2019.

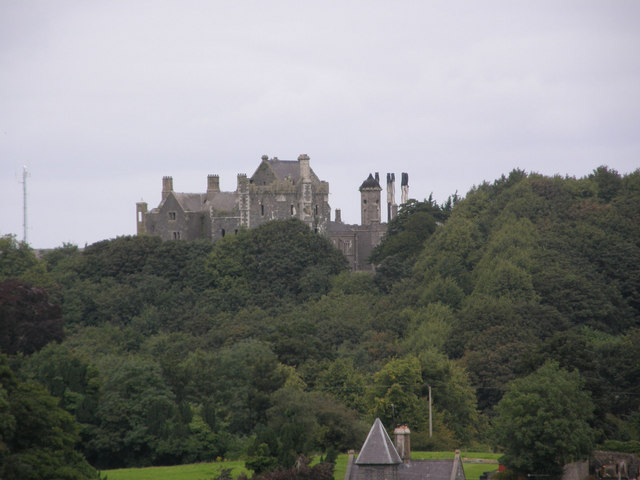
- Tayto Castle, Tandragee, County Armagh, Northern Ireland.
- Founded: 1956
- Headquarters: Tandragee, County Armagh, Northern Ireland
- Key people: Stephen Hutchinson, Chairman
- Website: tayto.com

Tayto Group Limited is a British manufacturer of crisps and corn snacks based in Tandragee, County Armagh, Northern Ireland. They describe themselves as the third largest snack manufacturer in the United Kingdom.

The company employs 300 people at its plant beside Tandragee Castle (called "Tayto Castle" as part of the advertising for the snacks) and remains the largest selling brand of crisps in Northern Ireland and the third biggest crisp and snack business in the United Kingdom. It owns the Golden Wonder, Ringos, Mr. Porky, Real Crisps, and Jonathan Crisp brands. The Northern Irish Tayto are also widely sold in County Donegal, especially in outlets in East Donegal and Inishowen.

The company is entirely separate from Tayto in the Republic of Ireland which has a similar product range; Tayto in the Republic of Ireland owns the name and mascot, and Tayto in Northern Ireland uses both under a licensing agreement. The Northern Irish Tayto is widely sold in both Northern Ireland and Great Britain, while the Republic of Ireland brand is sold in the Republic.

== History ==
Logo until 2019.

Tayto (Northern Ireland) was formed in 1956 by Thomas Hutchinson, Walter Gracey and Frederick John McKinney. It licensed the name and recipes from Tayto Crisps formed two years prior in the Republic of Ireland. The two companies operate entirely separately but have a similar range of products.

On 13 January 2006 it was announced that Tayto (NI) was to acquire the Corby and Scunthorpe sites of the former Golden Wonder business and the contract to produce Mini Pringles for Procter & Gamble. This secured some 195 jobs out of 350 that were under threat following Golden Wonder's entry into administration on 9 January 2006.

In December 2007, Tayto acquired Sirhowy Valley Foods Ltd, makers of the Real Crisps range.

On 14 March 2008 it was announced that Tayto would acquire Red Mill Snack foods, making it the 3rd largest crisp manufacturer in the UK. Most of the Red Mill brands were transferred under the Golden Wonder umbrella but Mr. Porky's pork scratchings continue to be produced under Tayto, from the plant in Westhoughton, Bolton.

On 21 January 2009 it was announced that Tayto had acquired Jonathan Crisp, the trading name of Natural Crisps Ltd, based in Staffordshire, England. The headquarters of the Tayto group, which is privately owned by the Hutchinson family, are in County Armagh; it now has a turnover of £150 million per annum and employs more than 1,400 people.

== Range ==
Like its counterpart in the Republic of Ireland, Tayto's signature brand is cheese & onion flavour crisps. They also sell beef & onion, ready salted, smoky bacon, salt & vinegar, Worcester sauce, prawn cocktail, spring onion, roast chicken and pickled onion flavoured crisps. Most Northern Irish Tayto are vegetarian-friendly.

== Palm oil usage ==
Tayto NI have a low score on the Palm Oil Buyers Scorecard, which is a measure of the sustainability of palm oil buyers endorsed by the World Wildlife Foundation. Tayto NI scored only 1 point out of 9 in the 2016 Scorecard. The score reflects a lack of transparency in their palm oil sourcing activity, despite being a member of the Roundtable on Sustainable Palm Oil.
