= Golden Wonder =

British snack food company

- Type: Snack manufacturer
- Industry: Snack Products
- Founded: 1947, in Stockbridge, near Edinburgh, Scotland
- Founder: William Alexander
- Headquarters: North Lincolnshire, England
- Products: Golden Wonder, Transform-A-Snack, Ringos
- Owner: Tayto
- Number of employees: ▲800 (2012)
- Website: Golden Wonder

Golden Wonder is a British company that manufactures snack foods, most notably crisps. These include Ringos, Golden Wonder and Transform-A-Snack. Since 2006, it has been a wholly owned subsidiary of the Northern Irish company Tayto, purchased from administration.

Founded in 1947, by the 1960s Golden Wonder was the most popular crisp brand in Britain, overtaking Smiths. They were overtaken by Walkers who are now the No. 1 crisp brand in the UK.

== History ==
The company was founded in 1947 by William Alexander, who owned a bakery in Stockbridge, Edinburgh. He started making crisps in order to use spare capacity in the deep-fat fryers which he normally used to make doughnuts. The company was named after the Golden Wonder potato, which Alexander believed to be the best for making crisps.

In 1952, the company moved to a purpose-built factory in Sighthill. The company was bought by Imperial Tobacco in 1961. By early 1960s, it was manufacturing crisps at three further sites, at Broxburn, Widnes and Corby. A site at Crumlin produced the "Pot Noodle".

The company was acquired by United Kingdom-based Dalgety plc in March 1987 as part of owned by Imperial Tobacco's breakup by new owner Hanson plc. A fire at the Corby site in 1988 destroyed many historical documents and photographs of the company. In February 1992 Sooner Snacks, manufacturer of Nik Naks and Wheat Crunchies, was bought from Borden Inc. by Dalgety plc, with the company being absorbed into Golden Wonder.

In 1995 Golden Wonder underwent a management buyout costing £54.6 million. In 2000 Bridgepoint Capital acquired the company for £156 million. In January 2006 the company was bought by Tayto, a company based in Tandragee, County Armagh.

Its notable brands have included "Wotsits", "Ringos", "Jungle Fresh" peanuts and Pot Noodle, which ceased to carry Golden Wonder branding after the brand (but not the manufacturing business itself) was sold to Unilever. In July 1995 Best Foods paid Dalgety plc about $280 million for its Golden Wonder Pot Noodle instant hot snacks manufacturing business. Following the purchase by Tayto in 2006, the Nik Naks and Wheat Crunchies brands were sold to United Biscuits. In 2022, they reached their 75th anniversary, one of the oldest crisp brands in Scotland.

== Products ==
Golden Wonder launched the cheese & onion crisp flavour in 1962. Their first flavoured crisp, the concept was first devised by Tayto in Ireland in 1953.

In the 1970s Golden Wonder produced a line of shell-shaped crisps called Rock 'n' Roller Crisps, named after that decade's rock and roll revival. They were available in salt & vinegar, cheese & onion and crispy bacon flavours. Golden Wonder ceased to make them in the 1980s.

In the 1980s Golden Wonder claimed on television and on their packets to be Britain's Noisiest Crisp. In the following decade a popular series of television adverts with adult actors indulging in childish antics carried another famous slogan: You'll never grow old in Golden Wonderland!.

In 2009 the Golden Wonder brand started to be used by Symingtons Ltd, under licence, for the production of The Nation's Noodle and The Nation's Pasta. The new range of instant noodles is similar to the Pot Noodle range, previously produced by Golden Wonder. Golden Wonder branding now features on snacks previously marketed by Red Mill, another snack manufacturer taken over by Tayto.

Golden Wonder now produces a number of different flavours of potato crisp; it is also the current owner of the XL Crisp brand. Golden Wonder was the former owner of the Wotsits brand, but when the company changed hands in May 2002 it was sold off separately to rival brand Walkers. Previous snacks Wheat Crunchies, Chips & Burgers and the corn based Nik Naks are now owned by KP.

== Administration ==
Golden Wonder entered into administration on 9 January 2006, threatening about 800 jobs. On 13 January 2006 it was announced that the Corby, Northamptonshire site and the contract for Mini Pringles, as produced by Golden Wonder, would transfer to Northern Irish crisp manufacturer Tayto.

The announcement brought the news that 195 of 350 jobs would be saved initially. On 20 January 2006 it was announced that Tayto was to buy all Golden Wonder's operations in the United Kingdom including the Scunthorpe, North Lincolnshire site, although it would sell the Wheat Crunchies and Nik Naks brands to United Biscuits.
