= Dalgety plc =

Australasian stock and station agency

Dalgety plc (from 1998 PIC International Group)
- Type: Public Listed Company
- Industry: Wool together with pastoral and agricultural company or stock and station agency and briefly a foods and agricultural conglomerate and since 1998 principally livestock genetics
- Founded: c.1846 in Melbourne Australia
- Founder: Frederick Gonnerman Dalgety
- Fate: PIC retains its own name and a separate identity and continues to display the Dalgety "world" but since 2005 as the major part of animal genetics combine Genus plc
- Headquarters: 100 George Street W1, previously 65 Leadenhall Street EC3, London, England
- Areas served: In its first century: Australia, New Zealand then from the second half of the 20th century all continents. In 2017 "more than 600 breeding herds in about 40 different countries"
- Key people: Frederick Gonnerman Dalgety
- Products: services to agriculture
- Number of employees: 16,073 (1992)
- Parent: Genus plc
- Website: http://na.picgenus.com

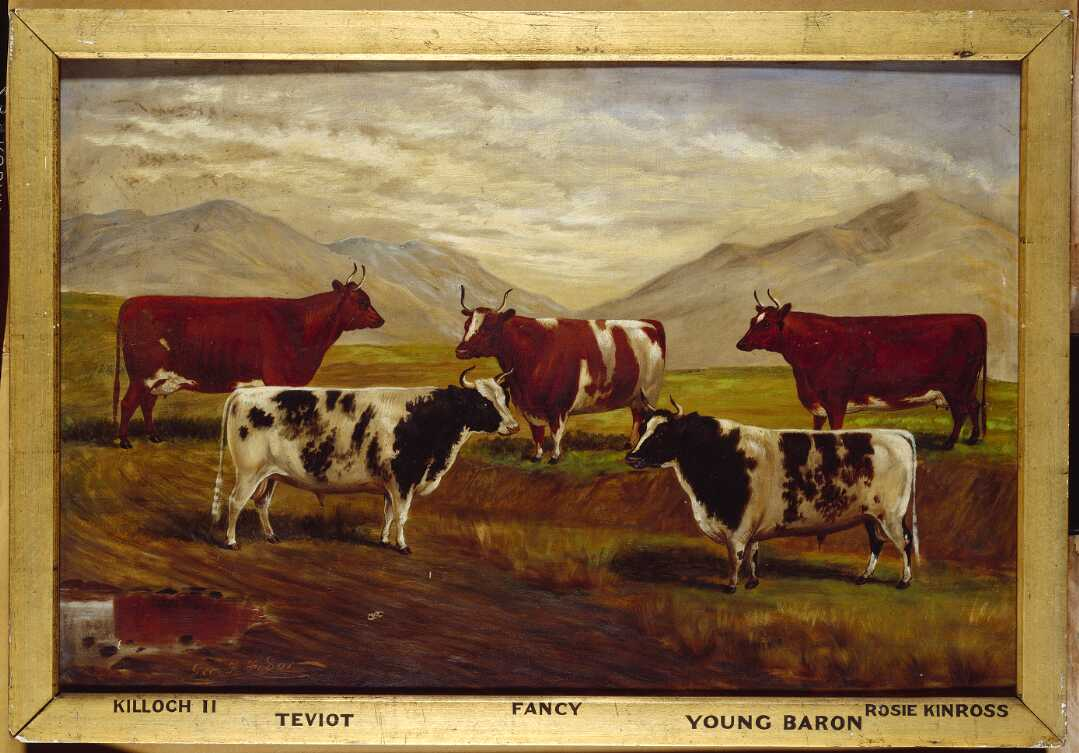
Portraits of champion cows and bulls by the official artist for Dalgety & Co ca.1885

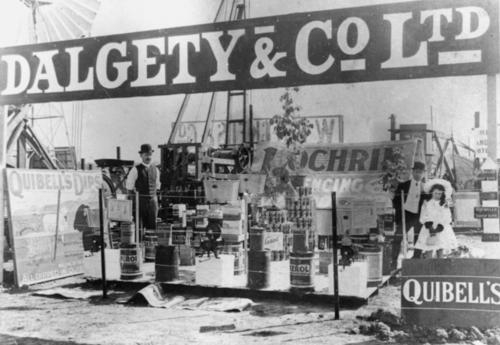
Dalgety's agricultural supply exhibit at the Rockhampton Showground, Queensland, ca. 1907

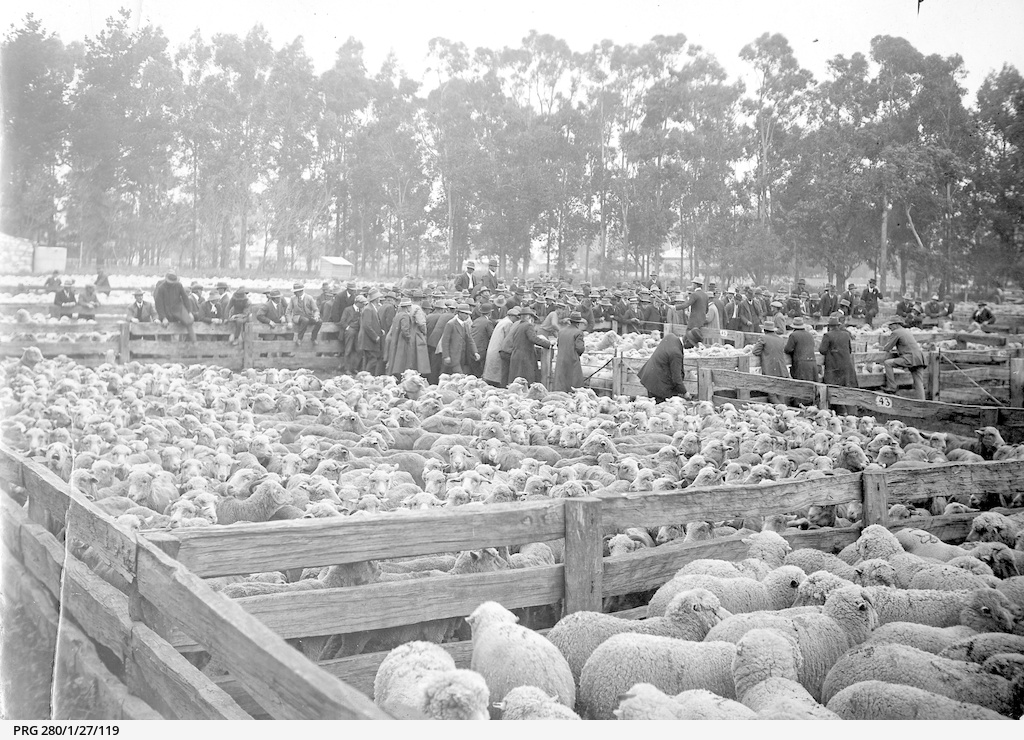
Dalgety auction 10,000 sheep Jamestown SA 1916

Dalgety plc—as Dalgety and Company—was for more than a century a major pastoral and agricultural company or stock and station agency in Australia and New Zealand. Controlled from London it was listed on the London Stock Exchange and Australasian exchanges.

With the mid-20th century decline of the pastoral sector, particularly where Dalgety held the leading position in the synthetics bedevilled slumping wool trade, new investment was made in different sectors in other countries and Australasian investments sold down until it became a foods and agricultural business of the northern hemisphere.

A successful conglomerate, its core businesses were badly damaged by the wholesale slaughter of British beef animals following the discovery mad cow disease did, as suspected, move from cattle to humans. In 1996 and 1997 Dalgety sold 75 per cent of its whole business leaving its principal investment in animal (porcine) biotechnology. Renamed PIC International after its own biotech subsidiary it merged in 2005 with a matching (bovine) business Genus plc for a market valuation in the same league as Dalgety had attained in the 1990s.

== History ==
Until the second half of the 20th century when it moved operations to the Northern Hemisphere and transformed itself into a conglomerate the major portion of Dalgety's business was the Australasian wool trade pioneered by John Macarthur in New South Wales. Dalgety depended on the woolgrowers. Soon after F G Dalgety went into business on his own account Australia's sheep numbers had reached around 20 million. Thirty years later there were more than 100 million but by 1903 by prolonged drought flocks had almost halved and numbers did not come back to 100 million until 1926. By that time UK took about 50 per cent of Australia's total wool exports. UK demand rose during the Second World War but as the war ended it was found the UK government held 10.4 million bales. In conjunction with officials from Australia New Zealand and South Africa a joint arrangement was made in 1945 to ensure its orderly sale and the sale was completed in 1951. Later the same year American demand generated by the outbreak of the Korean War pulled wool prices up to nine times the UK contract price of five years earlier but the following year Australia's returns from wool were halved.

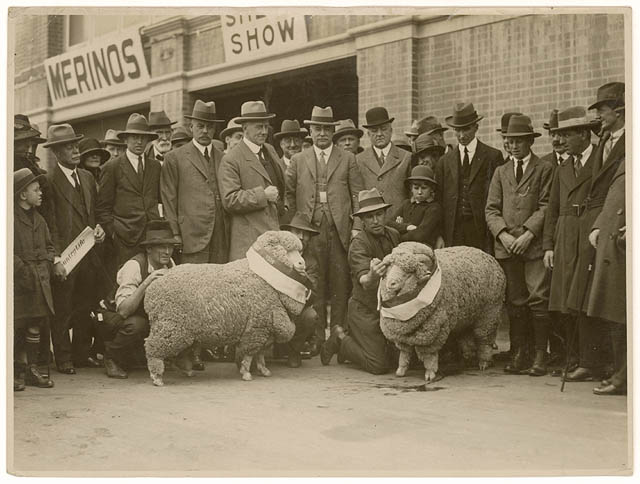
1933

Wool prices continued to fall but bottomed in 1971 when there were a record 180 million sheep, the sheep numbers to some extent compensating for low wool prices. Price stabilisation schemes were organised with Australian government support. That support was withdrawn in 1999.

"It was during the 1990s that the Australian wool industry came to fully realise that wool is merely one of a number of fibres which apparel makers can choose to use in their garments, and that demand for wool depends significantly on the relative prices of substitute fibres, particularly the high quality but cheap synthetic fibres being produced today."

In 1998 synthetics provided 49 per cent of apparel fibres, cotton 42 per cent, cellulosic 5 per cent and wool only 3 per cent.

=== Frederick Dalgety ===
In December 1842 Canadian Frederick Gonnerman Dalgety arrived in Melbourne, first settled in August 1835, as manager of a new firm which he soon bought. By 1848 Dalgety was an independent and well-to-do merchant concentrating on the settlers' trade providing merchandise for the squatters and buying their produce. He visited England in 1849 to strengthen his facilities for both credit and the disposal of colonial produce and returned to Victoria in 1851. In the 1851 gold rush Dalgety continued with general business, enlarged his pastoral trade, sold merchandise to the gold diggers and bought much gold from them. In 1851-55 he made about £150,000 from his gold speculations alone.

=== Dalgety & Company ===
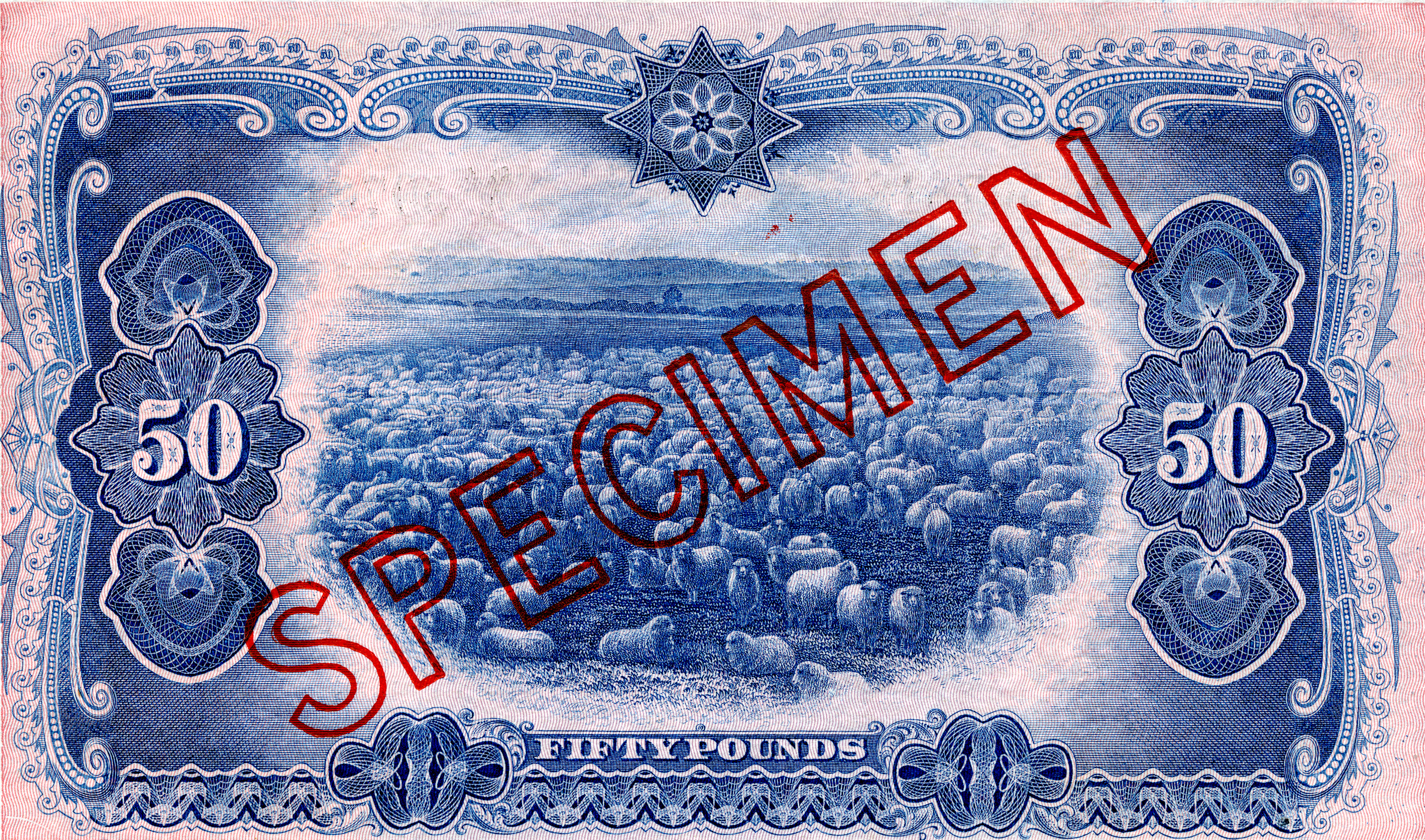
A small flock on a £50 note of 1918

In 1854 Dalgety moved to London to establish the headquarters of his metropolitan-colonial enterprise though at that time it dealt mainly with the Victorian pastoral industry. He took with him as London partner Frederick Du Croz and left Charles Ibbotson as a colonial manager-partner in Geelong. He came back to Victoria in 1857 to establish James Blackwood as another manager-partner in Melbourne but after 1859 he lived permanently in England and his business headquarters remained there to the end of the 20th century.

By 1884 Frederick Dalgety had ten partners including managing partners and they had operations in London, Melbourne, Geelong, Launceston, Dunedin, Christchurch and Sydney.

=== Dalgety & Company Limited ===
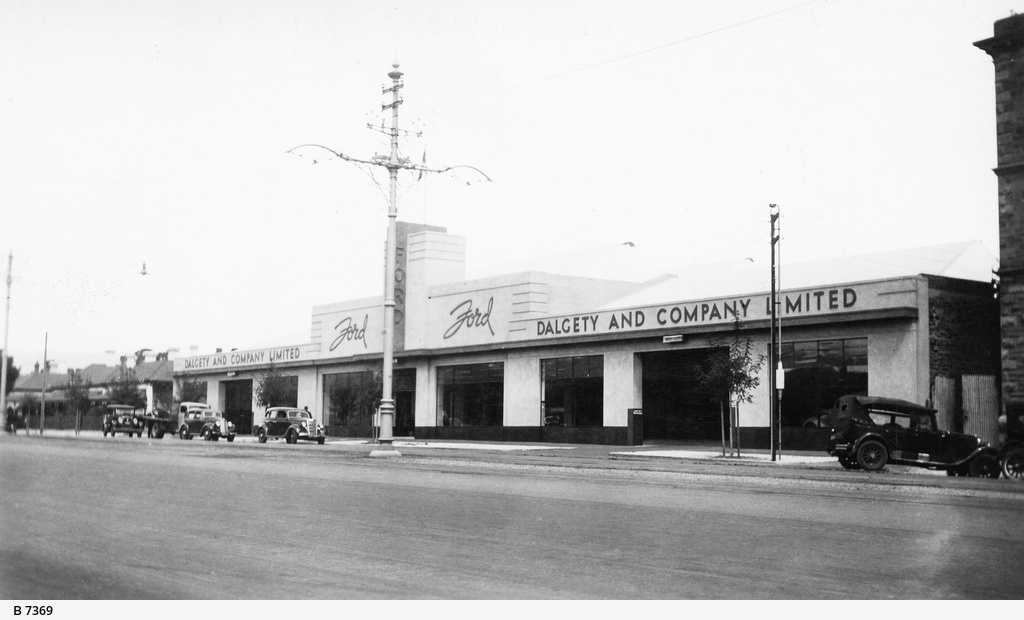
Ford dealership, Adelaide 1937

Dalgety, Du Croz and Co and their various partnerships were forced into incorporation as a joint-stock company by their clients' increasing demand for capital and the competition from other joint-stock companies and banks. Dalgety and Company Limited was registered in London on 29 April 1884. The new incorporation was listed on the London Stock Exchange in August 1884.

Over the next three years Dalgety branches opened in Queensland and Western Australia and the properties and other assets of the company increased by 50 per cent. Dalgety continued in active management as largest shareholder and chairman of directors until his death in 1894. He left at least seven stations in New Zealand but his Australian properties had been sold in the 1880s. Dalgety and Company Limited continued to grow after its founder died. In July 1898 an agreement was reached with the Russian consul in Melbourne for the use of Russian ships to transport wool from Australia to Europe.

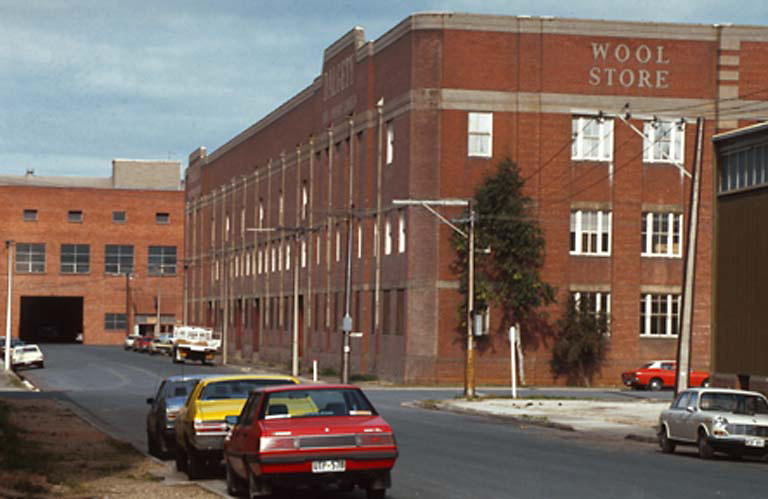
A Dalgety wool store in Port Adelaide built 1938

By 1909 there were branches at Melbourne and Geelong; Sydney and Newcastle; Brisbane, Rockhampton and Townsville; Adelaide; Perth, Fremantle, Kalgoorlie, Albany, Geraldton and Carnarvon; and in Auckland, Christchurch, Dunedin, Napier and Wellington.

In 1927 operations were broadened to include East Africa and then in 1959, by exchange of shares, the majority shareholding in African Mercantile Company was bought. African Mercantile Company was like the Australian business but in East Africa with eleven branches in Kenya, Tanganyika, Uganda and Zanzibar.

In the late 1950s Dalgety's business sector began to decline.

== 1960s ==
By 1961 Dalgety's core business was the operation of wool stores in the state capital cities along with wool broking in which it had built its position and become the world's largest wool-selling house. As stock and station agents Dalgety arranged the sale of livestock and maintained a strong merchandise operation. It also operated freight and passenger agencies for leading air and shipping lines. There was a substantial business as insurance agents.

Business was carried on at 446 centres; Australia 275, New Zealand 154, Kenya 7, Tanganyika 6, Uganda 3, Zanzibar 1 together with numerous subsidiaries. A United Kingdom subsidiary was developing the group's agricultural and trading interests within the UK.

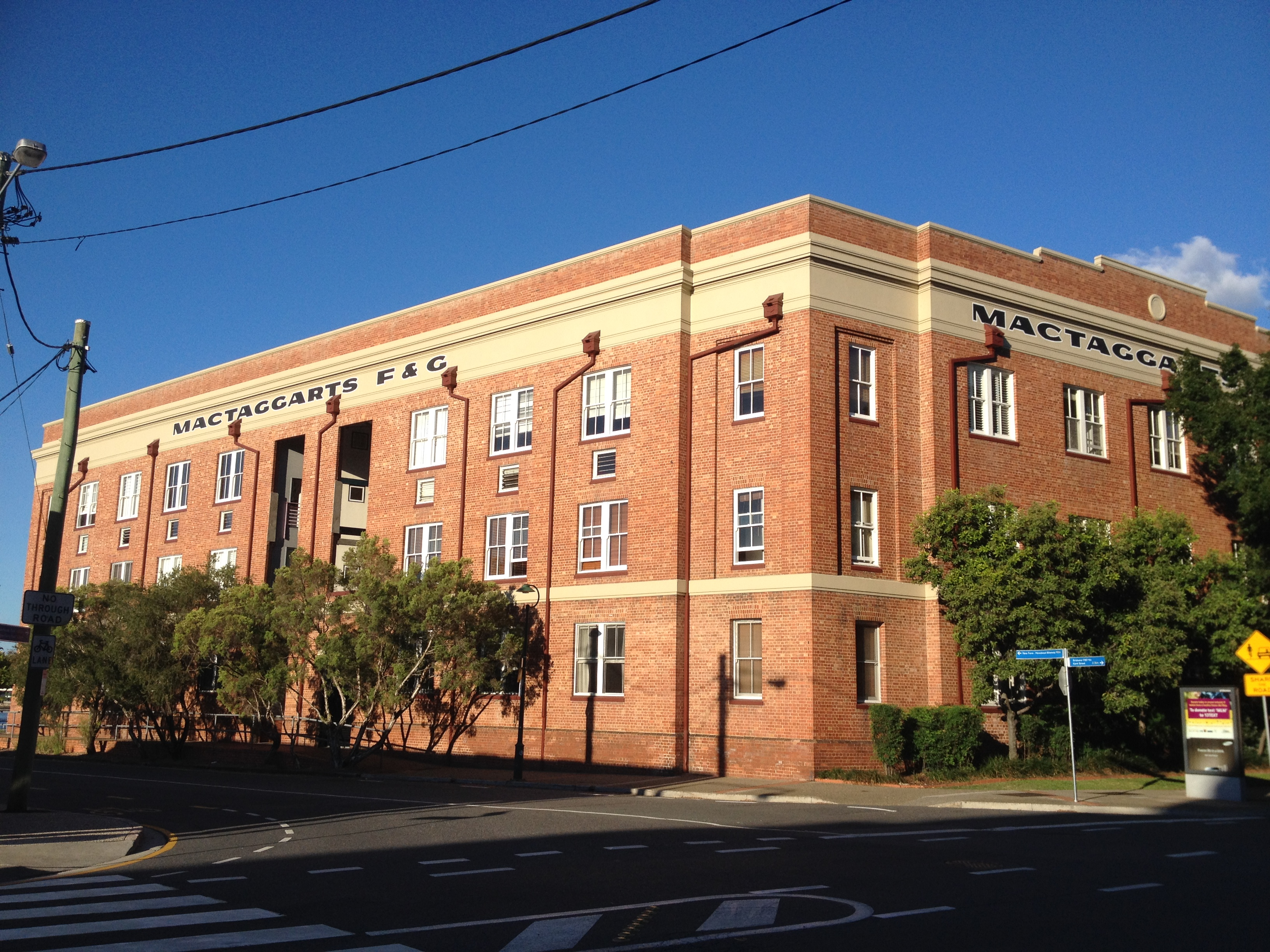
(former) New Zealand Loan and Mercantile wool store, Mactaggart place, Brisbane built 1926

To shore up declining profit margins various decisions were made. Multi-storey wool stores on valuable sites were sold off and replaced with single storey buildings on city outskirts. The single storey stores allowed the operation of modern more efficient handling machinery but the sale of old stores did not pay for new wool stores and Dalgety raised more capital by issuing debentures to investors in London.

=== Dalgety & New Zealand Loan Limited ===
Dalgety and Company Limited merged in November 1961 with New Zealand Loan and Mercantile Agency Company Limited, one of its principal competitors in Australia's eastern states and New Zealand. Dalgety and Company Limited changed its name to Dalgety and New Zealand Loan Limited marketed as Dalgety NZL. With assets of £44 million in 1963 the merged entity was the largest pastoral combine operating in Australasia.

=== East Africa ===
The East Africa activities were sold into a new combine with Smith Mackenzie and Company, trading from Zanzibar since the early 19th century and now the East African subsidiary of Inchcape and Company both parties taking equal shares.

=== Dalgety wharves ===
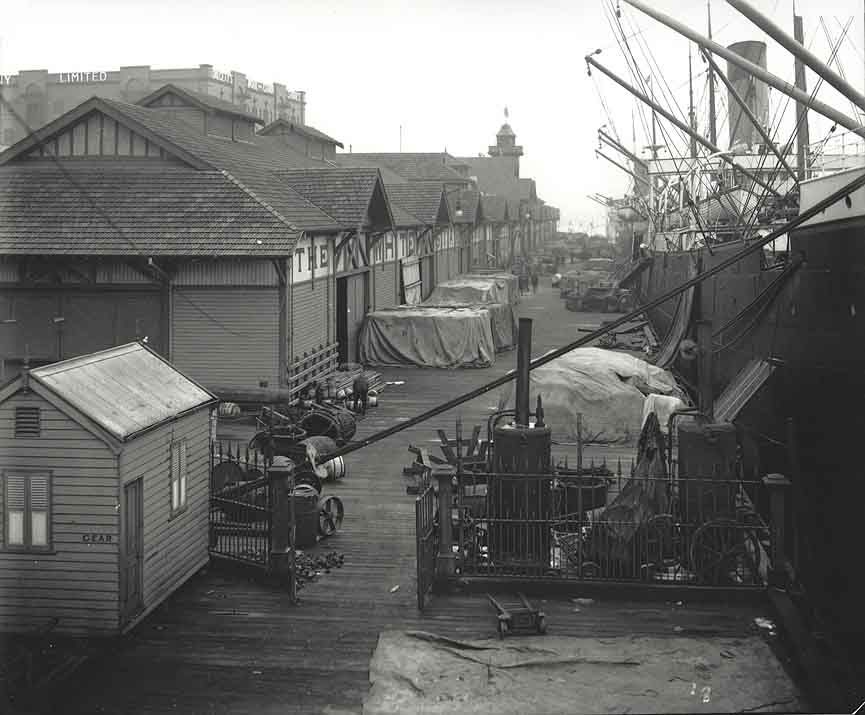
Dalgety wharf No. 1 Millers Point
(Darling Harbour)
bond store at top left

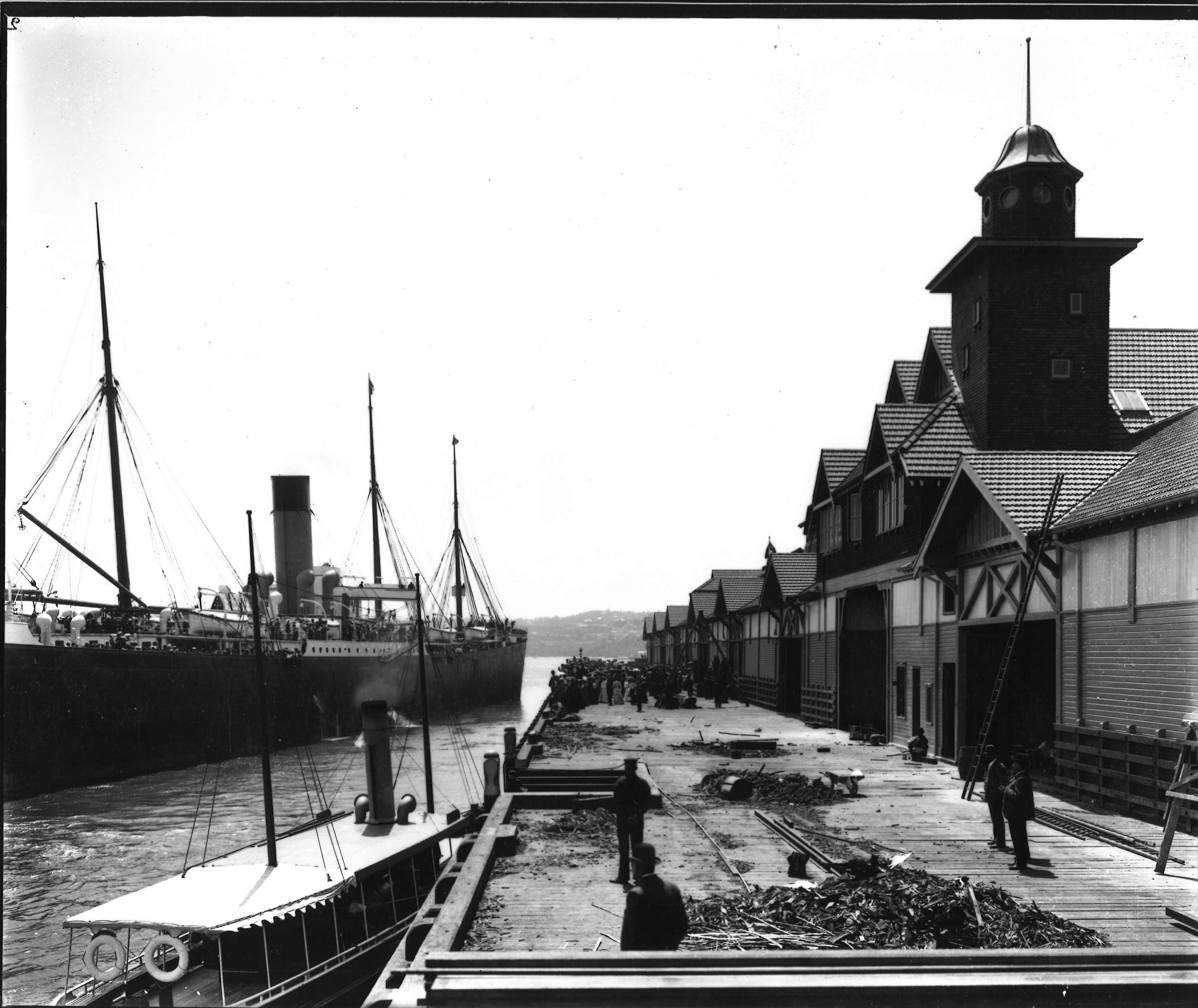
SS Medic departing Millers Point

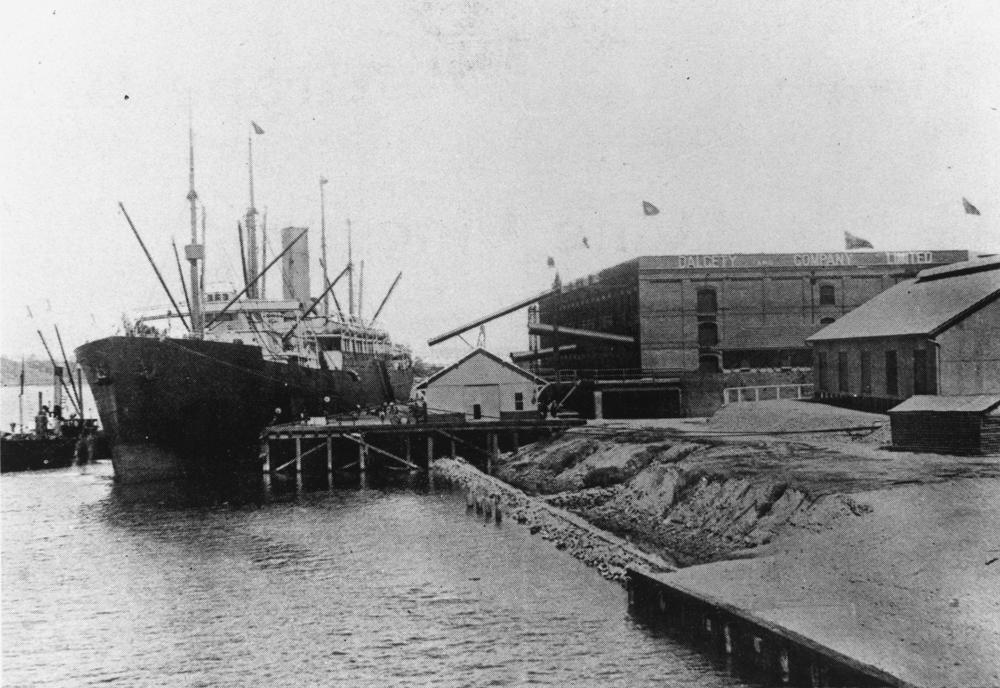
Dalgety wharf at New Farm, Queensland
SS Pericles loading

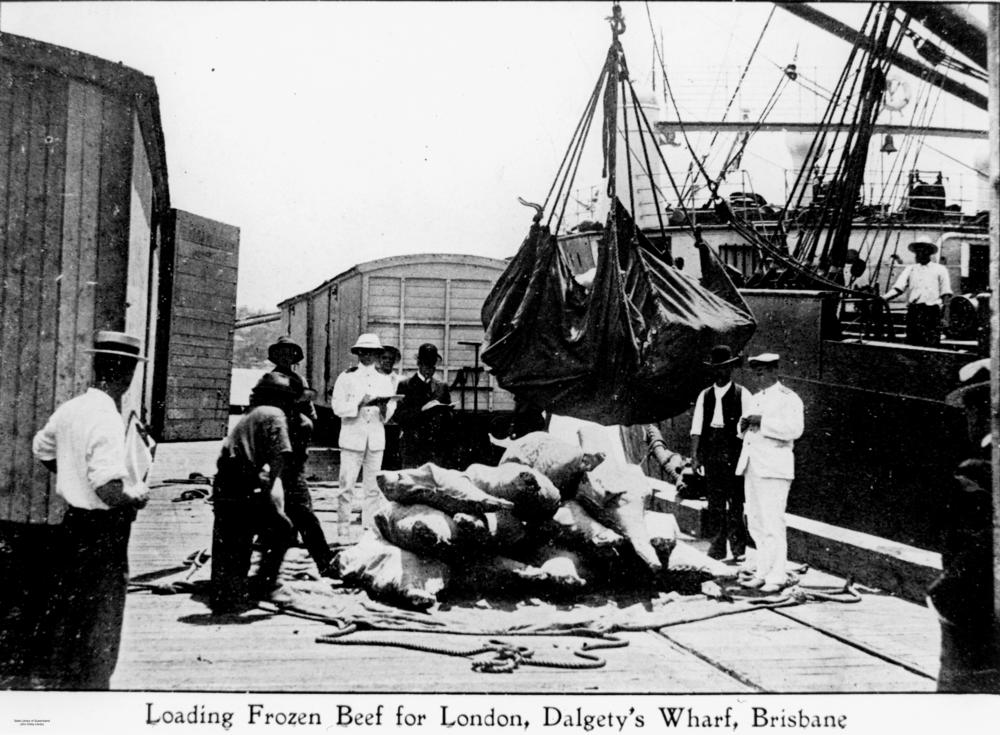
Loading frozen beef for London, Dalgety's wharf Brisbane

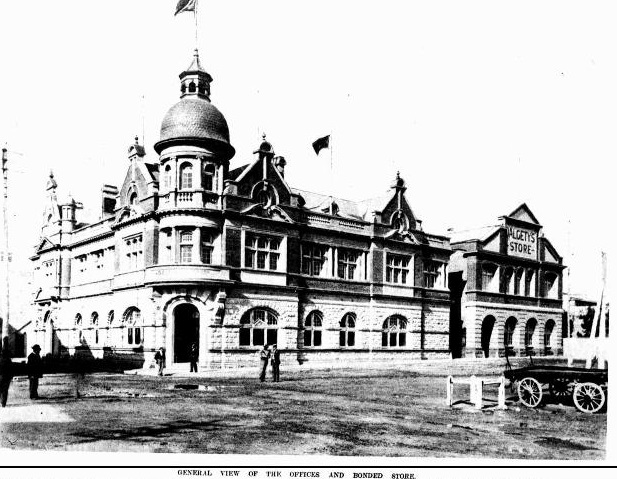
Fremantle, Western Australia 1902

== 1970s ==
In which Dalgety begins to switch investment and operations from agribusiness to northern hemisphere food.

=== Dalgety Australia and Dalgety New Zealand ===
As of 30 June 1970 Dalgety New Zealand Loan changed its name to Dalgety Limited —much later changed by legislation to Dalgety plc. On the same date it made itself a holding rather than operating company when new Australasian operating subsidiaries Dalgety Australia and Dalgety New Zealand took over Dalgety's two branch businesses. The group had 66 per cent and 23 per cent of its net assets in the two countries.

Dalgety Australia took over the Stonyfell winery in the eastern foothills of Adelaide in 1972, but by 1978 it had been taken over by Seagram's, at which time the winemaking part of the business at Stonyfell was wound up.

=== Catering supply ===
Smithfield's Peter Dumenil & Co specialising in meat processing and supply of meat, poultry and game for the catering industry was bought.

=== Animal feeds ===
A small English livestock and animal feeds business was brought into the group, Grossmith Agricultural Industries.

=== North American lumber and poultry ===
Intending to move their activities nearer the consumer Dalgety had expanded into North America in 1966 acquiring Balfour Guthrie, a San Francisco-based import-export and insurance business owning a Canadian business in wholesale lumber and a Californian business growing poultry. In 1974 Balfour Guthrie bought Spiegel Frozen Foods In Salinas California which harvested and froze "own brand" vegetables.

In 1968 Dalgety acquired one of the largest potato marketing organisations in Britain and in 1969 a pastoral property business, New Zealand and Australian Land Limited, by exchange of shares.

=== Pig Improvement Company, PIC ===
In 1970 Dalgety set up joint ventures with Tata and Consolidated Goldfields but most significantly of all acquired a biotech interest, a UK-based hybrid pig breeder which supplied live boars to pig farmers. The pig breeder, Pig Improvement Company, incorporated in 1962 would make very strong growth towards the very end of the 20th century. As the new heart of the old Dalgety business, an international pig and now also a shrimp breeder, PIC merged in 2005 with another biotechnology leader, cattle breeder Genus plc.

At the end of 1970 The Times "Top 1000" ("a guide to the performance of major British and international groupings") listed Dalgety at 17th in sales but 121st in profits. Dalgety's 65-68 Leadenhall Street, London EC3 head offices were sold for three times the cost of the hybrid pig investment. Another year of drought continued its serious effect on profits and commentators inspired speculators by suggesting a bidder for the business might come along. In August Dalgety announced the purchase of South Australian vineyards with a liquor distribution business and BDH an electrical appliance manufacturer.

USA poultry operations were phased out after substantial losses.

=== Associated British Maltsters ===
Late in 1972 Dalgety made a successful take-over bid for Associated British Maltsters. Profits rebounded in 1973; Australia contributed £5.34 million and New Zealand £4.7 million.

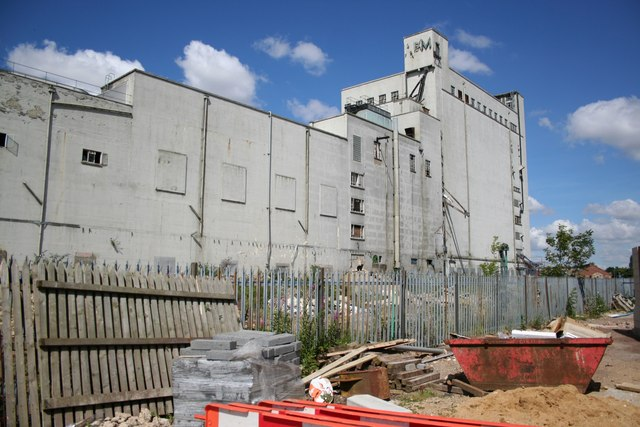
an ABM malt kiln, Louth, Lincolnshire shortly before demolition

The Dalgety rural division in Western Australia was sold to Western Livestock in August 1974. ICI bought Tasman Vaccine Laboratories. Dalgety New Zealand was now only 67 per cent owned. To handle agricultural commodities from Brazil Dalgety formed a new company with Munchmeyer Petersen of Hamburg.

By 1975 the United Kingdom division was the largest contributor to profits and that was repeated the following year. Commentators now considered the 67 per cent owned New Zealand business, its 1976 profit was £5.3 million, was inherently more profitable than Australia's.

Dalgety paid £10 million for Federated Chemical Holdings (without its minority shareholding in Tioxide Group) at the end of 1977 because it would fit well with the procurements as well as with marketing the products of their ABM Chemicals. Federated was a distributor of chemicals and allied raw materials in North America, Europe and the Far East.

=== Spillers-flour and animal feeds ===
At the end of 1978 Dalgety raised a total of $125 million by a rights issue to existing shareholders and through a ten-year borrowing facility arranged by Lazard Brothers and it launched a bid for Spillers, a flour milling, bread, pet food and animal feeds business. The planned takeover was strongly defended and an agreement between parties not settled until a year later. Spillers closed 23 bakeries with the loss of 8,000 jobs and sold 13 of its plants to Ranks Hovis McDougall.

=== Martin-Brower ===
In 1979 Dalgety also bought one of the world's largest distributors of frozen, dry and refrigerated foods and packaging materials for the fast food industry, Martin-Brower of USA, supplier of Ray Kroc's first paper napkins and distributor of McDonald's products.

According to an interview published in September 1979 by The New York Times, Dalgety had made itself the USA's second largest processor of frozen foods, behind United Brands.

By 1979 the shift to the Northern Hemisphere was nearing completion; 22 per cent of Dalgety's business was in North America and 35 per cent in Britain.

== 1980s ==
=== Dalgety Farmers Limited ===
Dalgety Australia, the Australian activities of Dalgety plc, agreed in July 1983 to merge with Bennetts Farmers and Farmers Grazcos Co-operative forming Dalgety Farmers, the largest pastoral house in Australia aside from Elders. Dalgety Farmers was then owned 65 per cent by Dalgety plc, 20 per cent by Farmers shareholders and 15 per cent by Bennetts shareholders.

At this time ANZ Bank acquired a pre-emptive right to buy Dalgety Farmers shares from Dalgety plc. (Note: Frederick Dalgety was for many years chairman of the Union Bank of Australia, the forerunner of ANZ Bank. These transactions were likely to be a return of a favour suggesting at some point the bank has risked its own survival to save Dalgety from collapse.) During 1985 Dalgety UK reduced its holding in Dalgety Farmers to 49 per cent. ANZ reached 25 per cent in 1989 and 95 per cent in 1992 in a debt-for-equity swap. Ownership passed to Wesfarmers Limited in 1993. Wesfamers was renamed Wesfarmers Dalgety in 2000 when the two businesses were rolled into one but the Dalgety name was dropped the following year.

==== Animal feeds ====
Dalgety announced in August 1983 purchase of the animal feeds, seeds and crop control businesses of the agricultural division of Ranks Hovis McDougall. At the time it was almost Dalgety's most expensive purchase second only to Spillers.

Dalgety was now a food and agricultural group and referred to as the Dalgety Spillers combine and had cut the Australian share of its turnover to just over 10 per cent. Eighteen months later it sold the last of what was Dalgety New Zealand (since 1857) to Cable Price Downer. Dalgety Farmers was formed the year before and over the next few years its control was moved to the ANZ Bank.

==== Centenary ====
1984 was Dalgety's centenary year. When it was floated in 1884 Vanity Fair accused the promoters of "foisting a disreputable issue on an unsuspecting public". The centenary was marked by a city banquet attended by Princess Anne.

It also announced the sale of Dalgety Foods, its American vegetable and soft fruit freezing business.

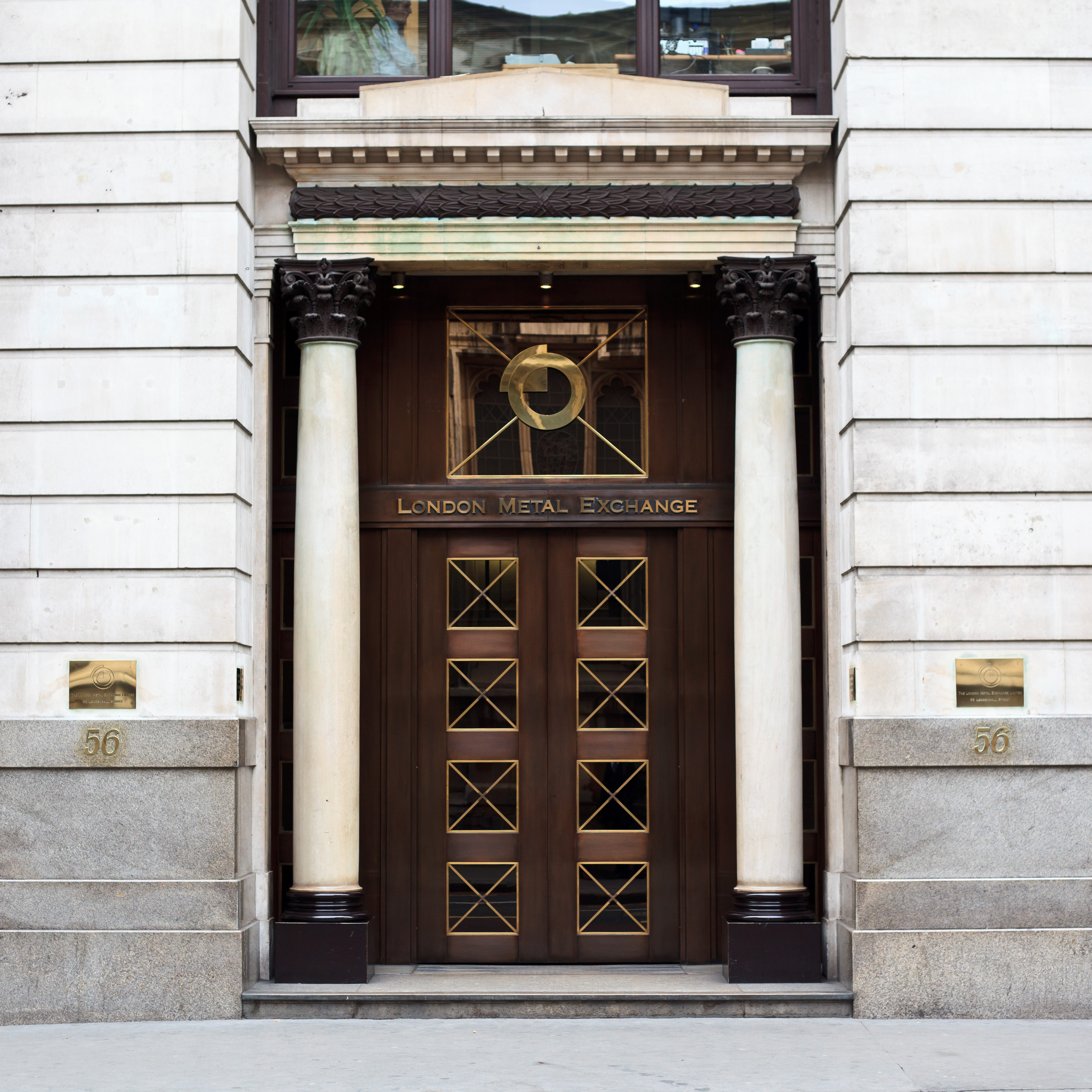
Entrance to the London Metal Exchange at 56 Leadenhall Street

==== Gill and Duffus ====
1985 saw the acquisition for £126 million of Gill and Duffus a commodities trader. It was meant to create synergy by expanding the firm's geographical coverage.

Dalgety is now described as a diversified foods group holding just 50 per cent of Dalgety Australia. It is now the fifth largest lumber producer in British Columbia.

However within twelve months difficulties in the tin market and London Metal Exchange led to a write-off of almost £28 million and Gill and Duffus withdrew from metals and "rationalised" their organisation. A further write off amounted to another £10 million that same year. £30 million was realised from the sale of ABM Chemicals to RTZ.

==== Golden Wonder ====
In 1986 Dalgety paid £87 million in a mixture of cash and shares for Golden Wonder, potato crisp manufacturers, along with the Ross potato distribution business and Flavourite and the press again began to see Dalgety as a takeover target. Inchcape Insurance paid £43 million for Dalgety's Clarkson Puckle insurance operation.

==== Homepride ====
Homepride Foods was launched by Spillers covering these Dalgety businesses: packaged flour and sauces, Romix, Pearce Duff and Sundora foods.

=== Funding ===
Dalgety "the food and commodity group" sold Associated British Maltsters to Harrisons & Crosfield for a net £29 million. The sale of Balfour Guthrie, Dalgety's Canadian lumber business, to its existing management realised £74.5 million. The proceeds were to be used to repay indebtedness and improve Dalgety's financial gearing. There was speculation that Dalgety might sell recent acquisition Gill and Duffus. Small Australian subsidiaries in engineering and air conditioning and heating are sold off and then a record profit of £92.5 million is announced and it is also announced that since June the previous year £194 million has been received from divestments, £45 million more than book value, and acquisitions in the same period cost £105 million.

Management protested "Dalgety is not a rag bag of unrelated businesses with little strategic direction and a patchy earnings record". Now committed to foods, agribusiness and commodities trading as core activities, branded foods accounted for 53 per cent of profits Holder of 99 per cent of the pot noodle market Dalgety announced the raising of £87 million by the breaking up and sale of their commodities trader, Gill and Duffus. Three of the four parcels were bought by existing management. The fourth, sugar, was bought by a Japanese consortium.

Commentators publicly noted Australian businessman Robert Holmes à Court had been stalking Dalgety for some time.

== 1990s ==
=== Important changes ===
There were dramatic changes. Chief Executive Officer Terry Pryce went in July 1989. Pryce was replaced by Maurice Warren. Warren then pushed through the Dalgety restructuring determined by their 1989 strategic review. Warren retired (after three years as chairman) aged 63 at the end of 1996. Another one-third of its remaining holding in Dalgety Farmers was sold to Commercial Union Assurance, ANZ Bank and their retirement funds. When the sale was completed Dalgety's Australian investments would be valued at less than £30 million including its remaining 41 per cent of Dalgety Farmers.

In 1990 Dalgety was added to the FTSE 100 share index.

In May 1991 Dalgety sold its USA fresh produce business for almost £29 million payable in 1994 and 1996 to an investment group which included Dalgety Produce's management.

==== Sooner Snacks ====
In February 1992 Dalgety bought Sooner Snacks for Golden Wonder paying £43 million to give Golden Wonder 20 per cent of the snack food market. Federal Bakery sold to Ranks Hovis McDougall for £24 million.

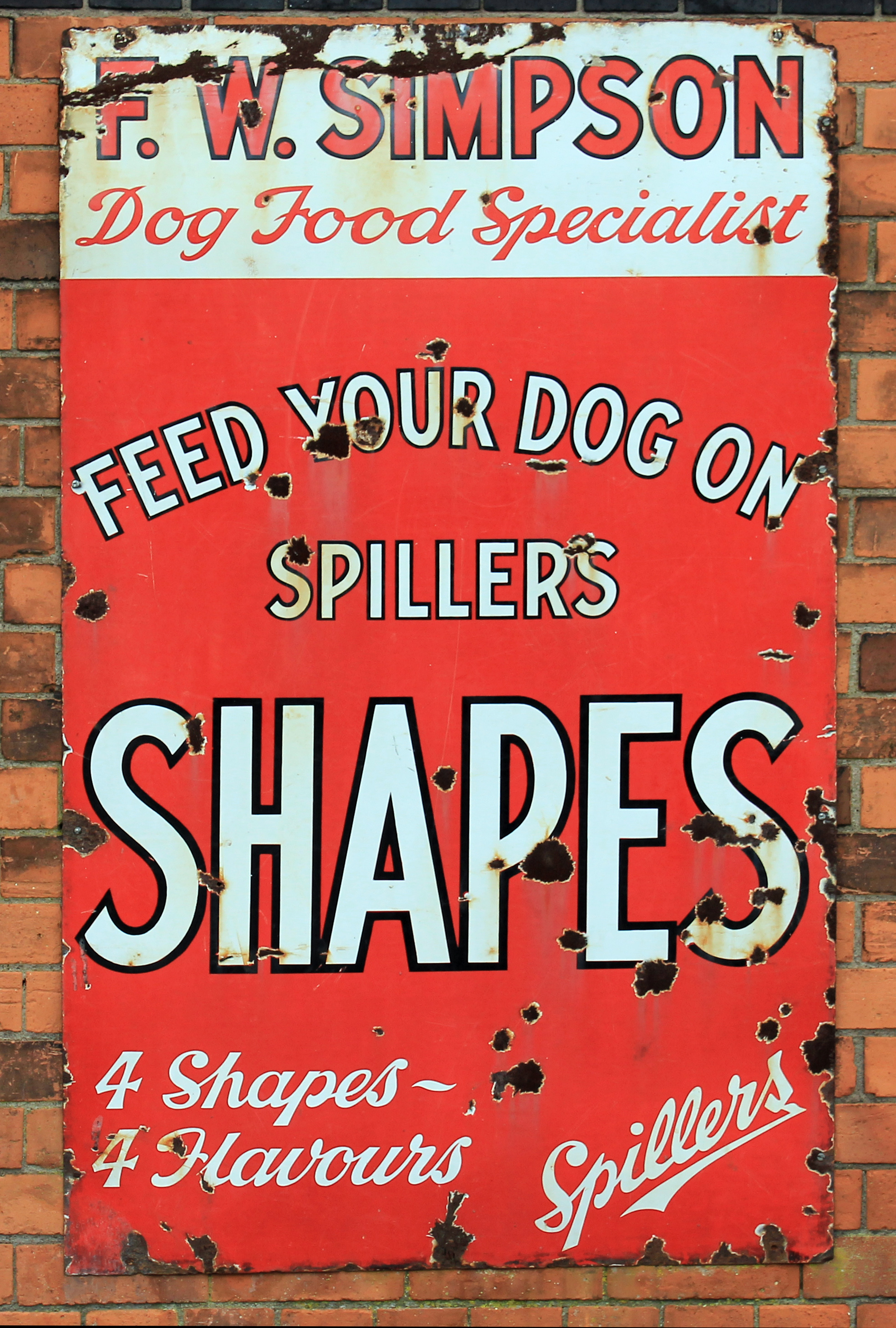

==== Pet foods ====
Paragon Petcare was bought in 1993 from BP Nutrition for £42 million.

Dalgety bought Quaker Oats European Pet Food's European pet food business for £442 million, the second biggest on the Continent after Mars, to merge with Spillers' pet foods and planned to sell Golden Wonder and Homepride to raise £300 million At the time these transactions were viewed as a part of a continuing exchange of important brands between the various big food manufacturers.

Then Pot Noodle was sold to US's mayonnaise maker, CPC for £180 million. Homepride sauces went to US's Campbell Soup for £59 million. Golden Wonder went to a management buyout for £54.6 million.

== Poleaxed by BSE ==
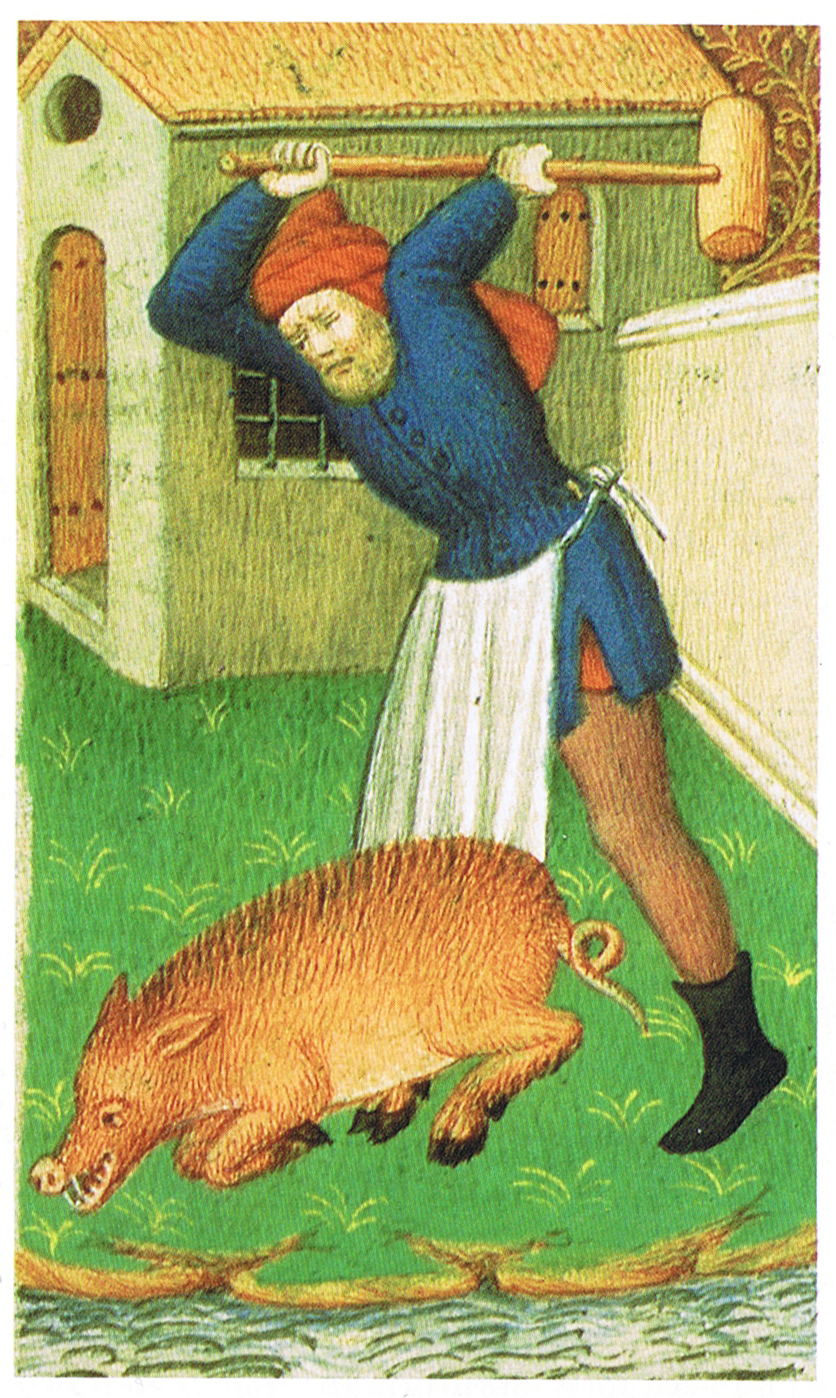
Poleaxing

BSE was a known disease of cattle but there had been no cases in British humans until 1993. They were farmers with infected dairy herds but it was unclear where the disease originated. Between 1992 and 1993 BSE cases in animals exceeded 100,000 then the incidence began to fall. The first known human victim of variant CJD died 21 May 1995 and 10 months later in March 1996 the British government acknowledged there is a link between the human disease and the cattle disease. The European Commission announced a worldwide ban on British beef exports and by April 1996 the British government responded with a plan to slaughter all cattle over the age of 30 months. In 2000 there seemed to be no more cases in humans.

This BSE or mad cow disease outbreak was blamed for collapse of Spillers sales of stock food because so many cattle had been slaughtered. For Dalgety an EU ban on export of beef products was the most expensive result and there was also a contamination scare in their Dutch pet food factory. Dealing with BSE distracted managers so that Quaker Oats integration costs turned out to be higher than expected. The integration programme was two years behind schedule and the value of sterling fell. When the full year profits were announced in September 1996 they were half those expected by the market. BSE was still blamed in the next half year profits.

By May 1997 some senior executives had moved on and a falling profit warning was published. The chief executive resigned in September. A £300 million corporate restructuring was announced and Spiilers and the rest of the food ingredient business together with USA fast food distributor, Martin-Brower, which supplied bread rolls to McDonald's, was put up for sale.

Homepride went to Kerry Group in January 1998 but Kerry did not take Martin-Brower. Martin-Brower went to Reyes Holdings in USA.

The various disposals totalled £1.2 billion and around a quarter of the old business remained. Dalgety still had: pig breeding, cattle feed, fertiliser and seeds.

=== PIC International ===
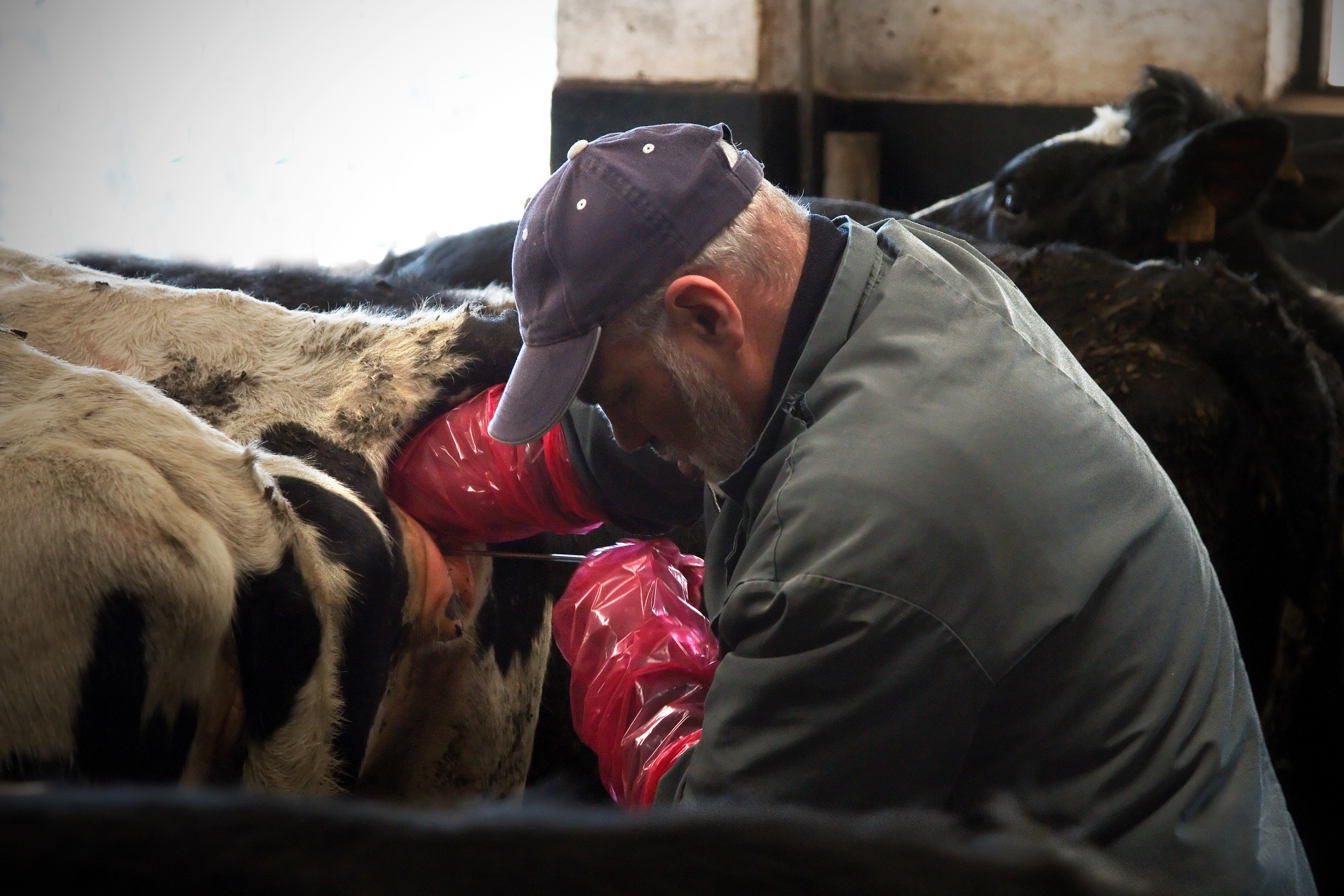
Artificial insemination of a cow

Dalgety was renamed PIC International Group plc. The PIC name, originally pig improvement company, came from the subsidiary bought by Dalgety in 1970. As well as the remaining activities the Dalgety board found they held rather more than £1 billion. Approximately two-thirds went as a return of capital to the shareholders. They received a total of £675 million in cash.

PIC International was renamed Sygen International in 2002. to hold PIC international and new enterprise SyAqua. Syaqua provided breeding stock to shrimp farmers with operations in Thailand, Mexico and Brazil.

Sygen, live boar supplier to pork farmers (pig semen cannot be frozen) was bought by bull breeder Genus plc which provided GM-free bull semen to cattle farmers. Genus, based in Crewe, had grown from the dissolved Milk Marketing Board acquiring MMB's 29,000 shareholders.

Genus developed sexed semen which provided only female calves reducing the slaughter of male calves. There was an echo of old times in Sygen's report for 2006. Profit had been affected by drought in Australia.

The group's stock market value, less than £30 million in 1997, had risen by 2011 to just under £600 million. and its business was recognised as the world leader in the science of bovine and porcine animal breeding. At that time its niche seemed safe because the length of the natural breeding cycle would hold back any competitor for years.
