= TTV =

The term TTV may refer to:

- Twitch.tv, a live video streaming platform
- T. T. V. Dhinakaran Indian politician and General Secretary of Amma Makkal Munnettra Kazagam
- Taiwan Television
  - TTV Main Channel (Chinese: 台視主頻)
  - TTV Family (Chinese: 台視家庭台)
  - TTV Finance (Chinese: 台視財經台)
  - TTV Health (Chinese: 台視綜合台)
  - TTV World (Chinese: 台視國際台)
- TTV (Poland), a Polish television channel
- TechTV
- Tallinna TV
- "TTV", the second track on the 2001 album Fahrenheit Fair Enough by Telefon Tel Aviv
- Thistle TV, a defunct local television channel in Lanarkshire, Scotland
- Through the Viewfinder photography
- Time to value
- Transfusion Transmitted Virus or Torque teno virus
- Transit Timing Variation, a method for detecting exoplanets
- True the Vote, a US non-profit vote-monitoring organization
- Text-to-video model, a form of generative artificial intelligence
