= Taiwan Beer (disambiguation) =

Taiwan Beer may refer to:

- Beer in Taiwan
- Taiwan Beer, a brand of beer produced by the Taiwan Tobacco and Liquor Corporation (TTL)
- Taiwan Beer (basketball), a Super Basketball League basketball team sponsored by TTL
- Taiwan Beer baseball team, established and operated by TTL in cooperation with the National Taiwan Sport University
- TaiwanBeer HeroBears a basketball team competing in the T1 League and also sponsored by TTL
