= Imperial Big Meal =

Taiwanese instant noodle brand

- Product type: Uni-President Enterprises Corporation
- Produced by: Taiwan Tobacco and Liquor Corporation
- Country: Taiwan
- Introduced: 1983

Imperial Big Meal (Chinese: 滿漢大餐; pinyin: Mǎn Hàn Dàcān) are a brand of instant noodle that is marketed in Taiwan by the Uni-President Enterprises Corporation. It is a series of instant noodles with real pieces of beef. This product comes in a variety of flavors.

== History ==
In 1983, the first bowl of "Imperial Big Meal Beef Noodles" came with a cooking bag. In the 1980s, Uni-President Enterprises Corporation came up with the idea of developing instant noodles with "conditioning bags" attached. Although they are now widely available, in the 1980s this was a very rare idea. This inspiration came from the room-temperature cooking bags developed by the United States Army, which used room-temperature sterilization soft bag technology combined with ready-to-eat bag when heated. The idea was jointly created with the renowned Taiwanese chef Fu Pei-mei, who once said, "Food should not be the exclusive right of the rich."

== See also ==
- List of instant noodle brands
- List of noodles
- TTL Hua Tiao Chicken Noodles
- Wei Lih Men
