= Wei Lih Men =

Taiwanese instant noodle brand

- Product type: Instant noodles
- Produced by: Wei Lih Food Industrial Co., Ltd.
- Country: Taiwan
- Introduced: 1973

Wei Lih Men (Chinese: 維力炸醬麵; pinyin: Wéilì zhájiàng miàn) is a Taiwanese brand of instant noodle that is marketed by the Wei Lih Food Industrial Co., Ltd. in 1973. This dry noodle concoction actually comes with two bowls – one for you to create the soup base and the other for you to stir and toss the noodles after you've drained the noodles. This type of instant noodles became popular in the Taiwanese market in the 1970s soon after its release on the market.

== History ==
Wei Lih Men entered the Taiwanese market in 1973. In the 1970s, the Taiwanese market lacked many consumer goods, so many companies competed to release instant noodle products. This product was special as unlike normal instant noodles, they are not eaten with the soup but served with fried bean sauce, in the form of Taiwanese style Zhajiangmian.

== See also ==
- List of instant noodle brands
- List of noodles
- Imperial Big Meal
- TTL Hua Tiao Chicken Noodles
