= TTL Hua Tiao Chicken Noodles =

Taiwanese instant noodle brand

- Product type: Instant noodles
- Produced by: Taiwan Tobacco and Liquor Corporation
- Country: Taiwan
- Introduced: 2013

TTL Hua Tiao Chicken Noodles (Chinese: 台酒花雕雞麵; pinyin: Táijiǔ Huādiāo Jī Miàn) are a brand of instant noodle that is marketed in Taiwan by the Taiwan Tobacco and Liquor Corporation in 2013. It is a series of wine-spiked broth instant noodles with real pieces of meat and is available in two packaging forms: bag and bowl. This type of instant noodles became popular in the Taiwanese market in 2015 and was well received. In 2017, sales in Taiwan exceeded 12 million bowls.

== History ==
In the 2010s, in order to digest 15 years of Huadiao wine inventory, Taiwan Tobacco and Liquor Company (TTL) began to develop a series of wine-flavoured instant noodles. In 2012, TTL launched TTL Sesame Oil Chicken Noodles; in 2013, it officially launched TTL Hua Tiao Chicken Noodles. At first, the brand did not receive much attention and it was not until November 2015, when Sigma (Wei Junrong), a food product project manager of Taiwanese Winery, published an article on PTT sharing the deliciousness of TTL Hua Tiao Chicken Noodles that the brand began to attract attention and even became popular. After the article was published, coupled with the cold winter weather, sales increased three to four times in a short period of time. Many retail stores were temporarily out of stock. The three major convenience stores (7-Eleven, Hi-Life and FamilyMart) all stated that sales have increased several times.

== See also ==
- List of instant noodle brands
- List of noodles
- Imperial Big Meal
- Wei Lih Men
