= Beer in Taiwan =

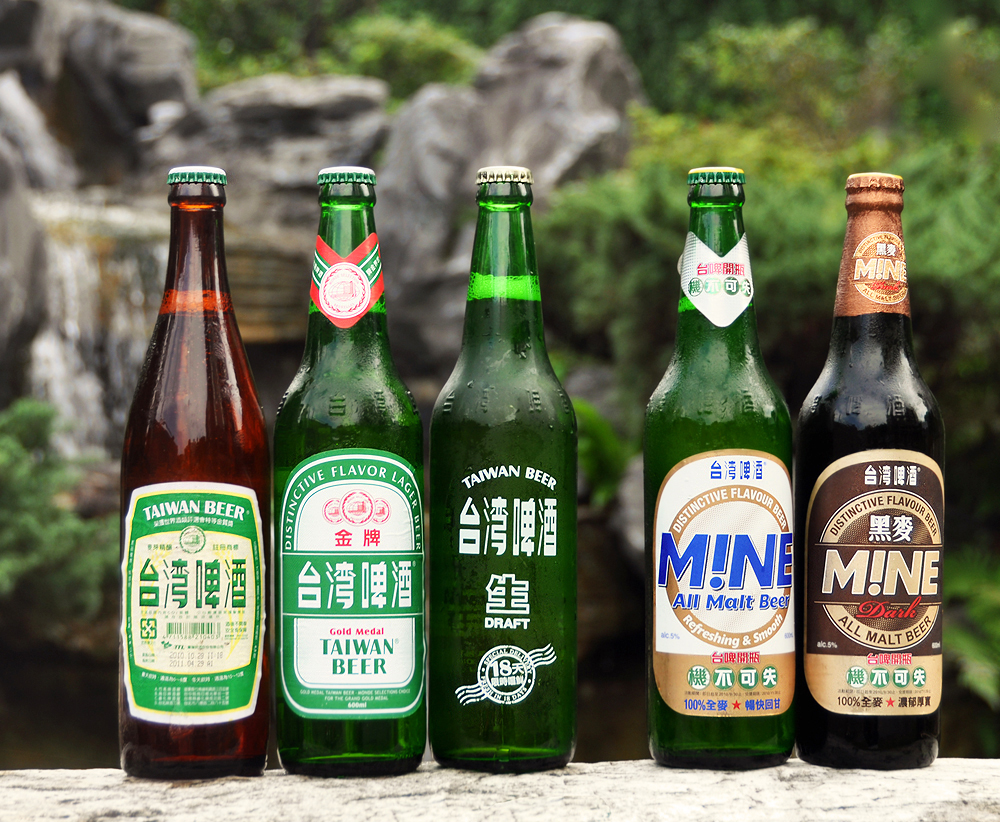
- Taiwan Beer is one of the best known brands of beer in Taiwan
- Traditional Chinese: 台灣啤酒
- Simplified Chinese: 台湾啤酒
Transcriptions
Standard Mandarin
- Hanyu Pinyin: Táiwān píjiǔ

Beer in Taiwan was dominated by monopoly products until 2002, when free trade became law in Taiwan. The main domestic brand remains Taiwan Beer, brewed by the publicly owned Taiwan Tobacco and Liquor Corporation that succeeded the government's monopoly bureau in 2002.

The liberalization of the Taiwanese beer market was followed by the emergence of craft breweries. Some of the well-developed brands include Buckskin (金車柏克金), Long Chuan (龍泉), Le Blé d'Or (金色三麥), Jolly Brewery+Restaurant (卓莉手工醸啤酒泰食餐廳), North Taiwan Brewing (北台灣麥酒) and Taihu Brewing (臺虎精釀).

== History ==
The first beer monopoly was held from 1922 to 1946 under Japanese rule by Takasago Beer. Takasago Beer was brewed in light and dark varieties and competed at times against Japanese import beers. Its successor in 1946, Taiwan Beer, remained a monopoly product after the island was taken over by the Republic of China. Taiwan entered its modern period of multiparty democracy in the 1990s and shed most of its government monopolies as it joined the World Trade Organization in 2002. After the opening up of the private alcohol market dozens of craft brewers sprung up. Expats made up a large percentage of the early craft brewers in Taiwan. Taiwanese craft breweries have had to work hard to distinguish themselves from both TTLC products and foreign imports.

== Economy ==
Domestic beer production in Taiwan was more than 400 million litres annually in 2008, with a significant volume being used for local consumption. Local beer production accounts for over 80% of total beer consumption in Taiwan. A small proportion of the domestically produced beer is exported.

== Beer market ==
In 2013 Taiwan consumed 517 million liters of beer, 149 million of which was imported. Beer is the most popular alcoholic beverage in Taiwan by volume.

== The 'Beer Wars' ==
Trade disputes with China led to what is known locally as the "Beer Wars".

Taiwan, officially the Republic of China (ROC), represented under the name Separate Customs Territory of Taiwan, Penghu, Kinmen, and Matsu and China, officially the People's Republic of China (PRC), represented by the People's Republic of China were admitted into the World Trade Organization (WTO) simultaneously in 2002. Beer could now be imported and exported across the Taiwan Strait for the first time.

Foreign labels accounted for just 18 percent of the NT$45 billion (US$1.3 billion) beer market in the ROC in 2004; Taiwan Beer accounted for all of the remaining 82 percent. Two years later the PRC refused to allow Taiwan Beer to be imported. Officials cited a law banning the use of county or regional names in commercial products. In the ROC this argument was hardly persuasive, given the number of products in China already sporting such names, including China's Tsingtao Beer, named for a city in Shandong province. The move was interpreted by many Taiwanese as an attempt to thwart the free trade PRC had pledged by denying Taiwan proper recognition of its trademarks. A boycott of beers from China was soon underway in the country. The controversy, widely reported in the international press, led to increased recognition of the Taiwan Beer brand.

== See also ==
- Beer and breweries by region
- Beer in China
- Beer in Japan
- Beer in the Philippines
- Taiwanese whisky
