= TTV News Channel =

- Country: Republic of China (Taiwan)
- Broadcast area: Worldwide
- Network: Taiwan Television

History
- Launched: December 31, 2014

The TTV News Channel (台視新聞台) is a free-to-air 24-hour news service owned by Taiwan Television, the country's oldest television company. It started broadcasting on December 31, 2014 on the digital terrestrial network.

== History ==
On August 30, 2005, the Satellite Radio and Television Business Review Committee (SRTBRC) of the Information Bureau of the Executive Yuan reviewed applications to establish a news station from Fubon Group and Taiwan TV, and ETTV's application to broadcast three additional news periods (morning and lunchtime) on ETTV General Station, but all three cases failed. The committee believed that the plans of Fubon and TTV were not specific enough. On September 23, 2005, the SRTBRC held a meeting. Applications from Eastern TV, Fubon Media Technology and TTV were not approved.

On December 13, 2014, TTV held its first overseas "TTV 53th Annual Meeting" at the New Takanawa Prince Hotel in Tokyo, Japan. TTV Chairman Huang Song announced that TTV News would launch January 1, 2015.

On December 29, 2014, TTV reorganized its channels, upgrading TTV's main channel to high-definition and launching "TTV News Channel", while merging TTV HD Channel into the main channel of TTV, and the original position of TTV HD channel on cable TV was replaced by TTV News channel. From December 29 to 31, 2014, TTV News Channel conducted a trial broadcast. During the trial broadcast, in addition to main channel news, it broadcast in-depth reports and intellectual programs. At 23:58 on December 31, 2014, TTV News Channel officially launched, with programs "TTV News in Taiwanese" and "Historical Chronicles". On May 5, 2015, Taiwan TV News Channel launched on Chunghwa Telecom MOD. On July 29, 2015, the National Communications Commission approved TTV News' application to upgrade its terrestrial television signals to HD. At 10 a.m. on December 16, 2015, the channel started a live simulcast on YouTube.

On July 6, 2016, due to the terrestrial launch of TITV, TTV News changed its LCN from channel 14 to channel 15. On December 21, 2016, TTV News upgraded to HD on terrestrial and cable television, and the channel logo was changed to "TTV News HD".

As of 2019, the in-house production rate was of 99.66%, the highest among the terrestrial networks. From 2015 to 2020, it was consistently the top-rated Taiwanese news channel.
