= Monopoly Bureau =

Monopoly Bureau Building
- 專賣局
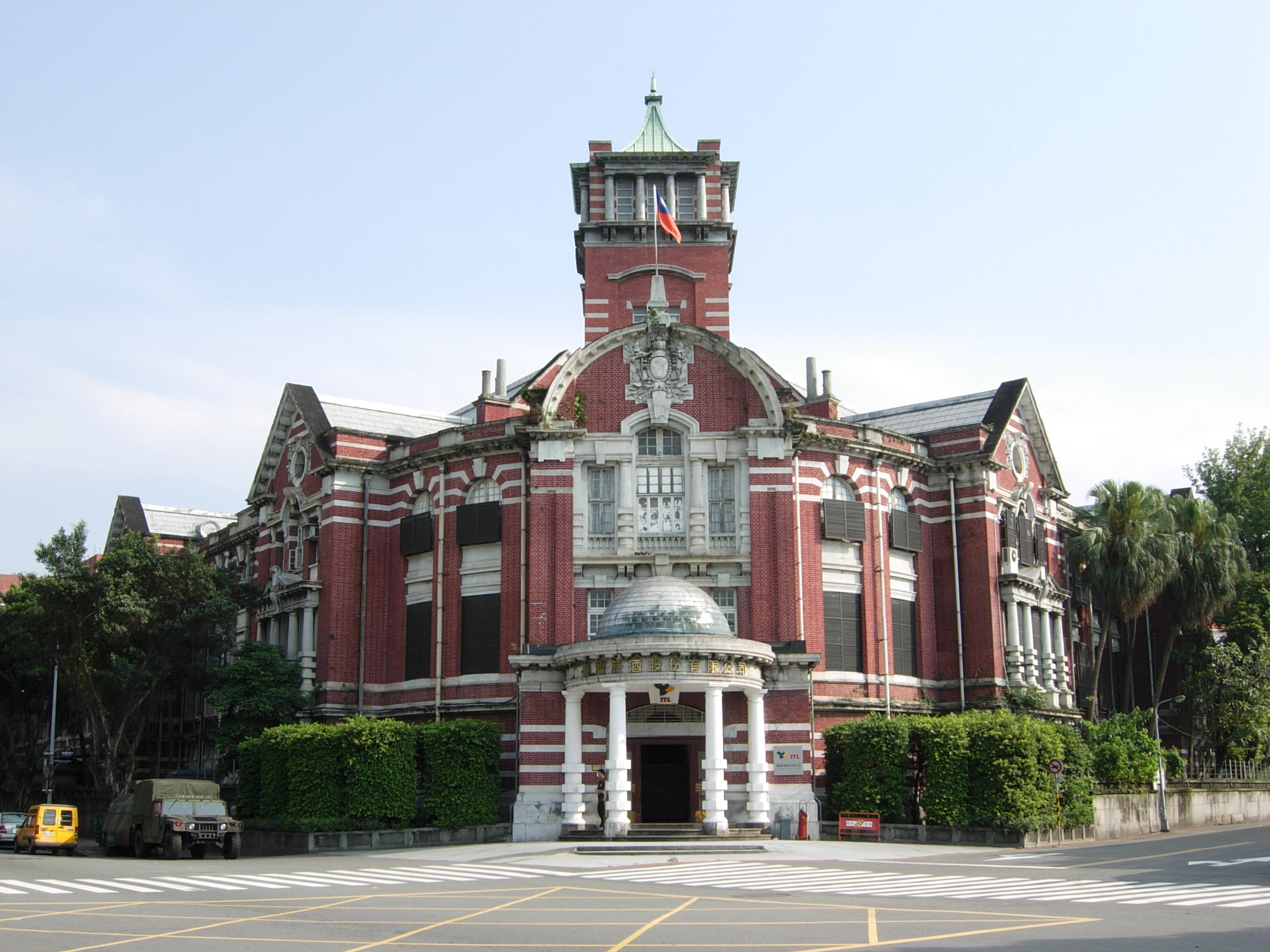
- Interactive map of the Monopoly Bureau Building area

General information
- Location: Taipei, Taiwan
- Coordinates: 25°2′2.6″N 121°30′53.53″E
- Current tenants: Taiwan Tobacco and Liquor Corporation
- Construction started: 1913
- Completed: 1922

Design and construction
- Architect: Matsunosuke Moriyama

National monument of Taiwan
- Official name: 專賣局(今臺灣菸酒股份有限公司)
- Type: Government
- Designated: 10 June 1998

Monopoly Bureau
- Traditional Chinese: 專賣局
- Simplified Chinese: 专卖局
Transcriptions
Standard Mandarin
- Hanyu Pinyin: Zhuānmài Jú
Southern Min
- Hokkien POJ: Choan-bē-kio̍k
- Tâi-lô: Tsuan-bē-kio̍k

The Monopoly Bureau Building is a Renaissance-style red brick building located in Nan Chang Street, Taipei City, Taiwan. It is in the Zhongzheng District, near Aiguo West Road, Park Road and Nanchang intersection ring, and Taipei's city south gate. It is also located nearby the Republic of China Ministry of Finance and the President of the Republic of China's Official Residence. The building was built in 1913 during the Japanese rule of Taiwan.

The building was designed by the architect Matsunosuke Moriyama and constructed in 1913 by the Kobe Group. The six-story tower topped with a spire is the most unusual feature of the building. In addition to the tower, the building is decorated with a copper roof.

The building housed the offices of the Monopoly Bureau of the Taiwan Governor's Office during Japanese rule and the Taiwan Tobacco and Wine Monopoly Bureau under ROC rule. It now houses the headquarters office for the Taiwan Tobacco and Liquor Corporation.
