= Fu Pei-mei =

Taiwanese chef

- 傅培梅
- Fu in 1982
- Born: 1 October 1931; Dairen, Kwantung Province, Empire of Japan
- Died: 16 September 2004 (aged 72); Beitou, Taipei, Taiwan
- Occupation: Chef
- Years active: 1962–2002

Fu Pei-mei (Chinese: 傅培梅; pinyin: Fù Péiméi; Pe̍h-ōe-jī: Pòo Puê-muî; 1 October 1931 – 16 September 2004) was a Taiwanese waishengren chef. She wrote over 30 cookbooks on Chinese cuisine, and produced and hosted cooking programs on Taiwan Television and Japan's NHK. In 2012, she was posthumously awarded the special award at the 47th Golden Bell Awards ceremony.

== Life ==
Fu was born in 1931 in Dalian, under Japanese rule at the time. Aged 15, she left the city due to the events of the Chinese Civil War, and took on clerical work, where her company provided meals to its workers. Fu moved to Taiwan at age 18, as Chinese Communist forces consolidated control over the mainland. Before becoming a cook, she worked in a trading company and appeared in television commercials promoting electrical appliances. Fu left her career behind to marry Cheng Shao-ching, whom she met on a blind date. Cheng expected Fu to cook, and she tried to learn while raising a family, but she did not have time to focus on cooking until her children began attending school. Fu sought chefs from several well-known restaurants in Taipei to teach her how to cook, mailing a note that read, "Seeking famous chefs to learn cooking from, high pay." Fu spent two years, 1957 and 1958, as well as the entirety of her dowry, on sessions with these chefs, then began teaching students of her own in 1961. At first her audience were mainly Taiwanese housewives. Fu later taught wives of United States Armed Forces stationed in Taiwan. It was one of those students that helped her contact a producer at Taiwan Television, where she began her television career.

For forty years, from 1962 to 2002, Fu hosted a series of cooking programs at Taiwan Television titled Fu Pei-mei Time, presenting over 4000 Chinese cuisine dishes. Her programs were exported to Japan, the United States, the Philippines and other Asian countries. Fu's show won a Golden Bell Award in 1997. She could speak the Jiaoliao Mandarin dialect natively, and was additionally fluent in standard Mandarin, Sichuanese, Cantonese, and Hokkien, as well as English and Japanese. Fu was frequently invited to appear on Japan's NHK, while her English-language programs were aided by a daughter. Fu published an English–Chinese bilingual edition of her first cookbook in 1969, translating the text herself. Pei Mei's Chinese Cook Book ran for three volumes. Fu wrote over 30 cookbooks in Chinese and English and ran a cooking class. Fu helped develop a number of flavorful precooked food products, including Manhan Noodles, an instant noodle product marketed by Uni-President, and a product line of five entrees for Ajinomoto.

Fu died on 16 September 2004 of pancreatic cancer, aged 72.

== Legacy ==
In 1971, Raymond A. Sokolov of The New York Times stated that Fu Pei-mei "could be called the Julia Child of Chinese cooking." Fu Pei-mei had a positive reception to the comparison.

In 2012, she posthumously received the special Golden Bell Award. In October 2015, a Google Doodle was dedicated to her.

A mini-series about Fu's life, sharing the same name as her autobiography, What She Put on the Table, aired in Taiwan during the summer of 2017. It was available globally starting in the fall of 2018 through the online streaming platform, Netflix.

== TV shows ==
- Chinese Cooking with Fu Pei-mei, (aired on RPN and later on ABS-CBN as part of Saturday morning program, respectively)

== Books ==
- Pei Mei's Chinese Cook Book

== Television ==
- Fu Pei-mei Time

== See also ==
- Imperial Big Meal
