= Pei Mei's Chinese Cook Book =

Cookbook series by Fu Pei-mei

- Traditional Chinese: 培梅食譜
- Simplified Chinese: 培梅食谱
Transcriptions
Standard Mandarin
- Hanyu Pinyin: Péiméi Shípǔ
- Wade–Giles: P'ei2-mei2 Shih2-p'u3

Pei Mei's Chinese Cook Book (Chinese: 培梅食譜) is a cookbook series by Fu Pei-mei, written in both Chinese and English. There were three volumes, the first published in 1969 and the last published in 1979.

The sales of the first volume reached 500,000. Luke Tsai, in Eater, described the first volume as "easily one of the most influential Chinese cookbooks of all time." Tsai, also writing for Taste, stated that parents of people in Taiwan who became adults circa 1989 to 1999, and those people themselves, are likely to possess at least one volume of this series. The release of this book also made Fu known in Western countries, and this is the most well-known aspect of Fu in those countries.

As of 2020 there are 1,000 copies of the book in Radical Family Farms, in Sebastopol, California.
