= TTV Family =

Taiwanese television channel

TTV Family (Off Air)
- Country: Republic of China (Taiwan)
- Broadcast area: Taiwan
- Network: Taiwan Television
- Headquarters: Taipei City, Taiwan

Ownership
- Owner: Taiwan Television Enterprise

History
- Launched: June 1, 2004

Links
- Website: http://family.ttv.com.tw/

TTV Family (Chinese: 台視家庭台) is a digital television channel operated by Taiwan Television (TTV) in Taiwan, it shares the channel with TTV Finance.

== History ==
On June 1, 2004, TTV announced the launch of its three digital terrestrial television channels, establishing the "TTV Financial Channel Project Center" and the "TTV Family Channel Project Center", which were officially broadcast on TTV's digital multi-channel automatic broadcast control system. On July 1, 2004, the five major TV station members of the Television Society of the Republic of China (Taiwan Television, China Television, China Television, FTV, and Public Television) co-organized the "Republic of China Digital Terrestrial Television Launching Ceremony" at the Zhongtai Hotel in Taipei City. On September 1, 2004, TTV’s Financial Channel was launched and was concurrently broadcast with TTV’s Family Channel.

== See also ==
- Media of Taiwan
