= TTV Finance =

Television channel of Taiwan

- Country: Republic of China (Taiwan)
- Broadcast area: Taiwan
- Network: Taiwan Television

History
- Launched: 2004-09-01

Links
- Website: http://fortune.ttv.com.tw/

TTV Finance (Chinese: 台視財經台; pinyin: Táishì Cáijīng Tái) is a digital television channel operated by Taiwan Television (TTV) in Taiwan, launched on September 1, 2004. Now TTV Finance shares channel with TTV Family.

On October 12, 2020, TTV Finance converted to high-definition broadcasts.
