= TTV World =

Defunct Taiwanese television station

- Country: Taiwan; Malaysia; Singapore; Brunei
- Broadcast area: Worldwide
- Network: Taiwan Television
- Headquarters: Taipei City, Republic of China

Programming
- Picture format: SDTV 576i

Ownership
- Owner: Taiwan Television

History
- Launched: 22 July 2005
- Closed: 28 November 2016

Links
- Website: www.ttv.com.tw/world

TTV World (Chinese: 台視國際台) was a television channel operated by Taiwan Television (TTV) in Taiwan, launched on 22 July 2005, but was only broadcast abroad.

== Broadcast platform ==
- North America--Cloud Tech Media
- Australia-----FetchTV (Australia)
- Malaysia------ABNXcess
- Singapore----Singtel TV
