= Taiwan Television =

- Type: Free-to-air national generalist
- Country: Taiwan

Ownership
- Owner: Unique Satellite TV

History
- Founded: April 28, 1962; 64 years ago
- Launched: October 10, 1962; 64 years ago
- Founder: Taiwan Provincial Government

Links
- Website: http://www.ttv.com.tw

Availability

Streaming media
- Sling TV: Internet Protocol television

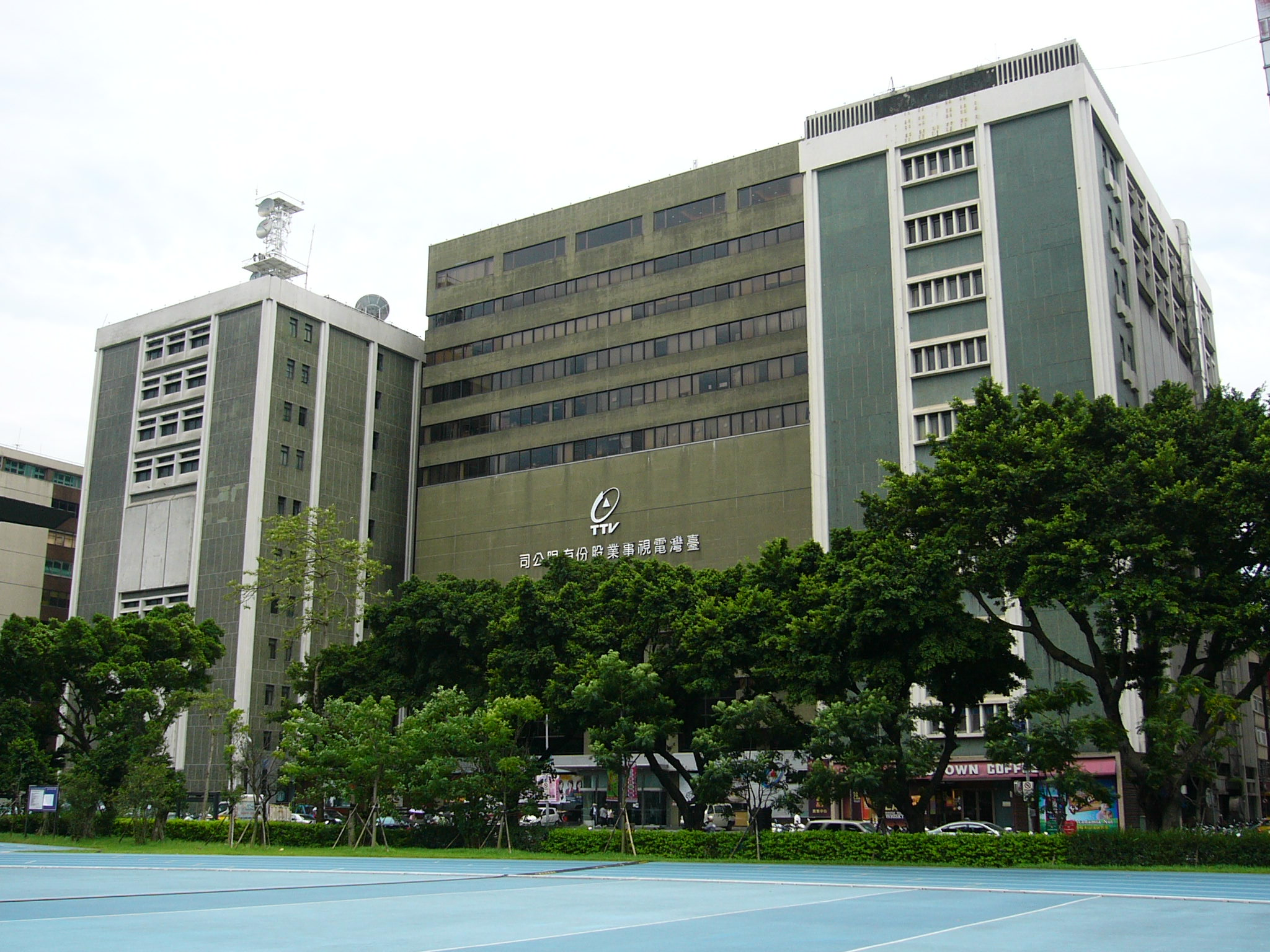
TTV building in Taipei City

Taiwan Television Enterprise, Ltd. (Chinese: 臺灣電視公司; pinyin: Táiwān Diànshì Gōngsī; Pe̍h-ōe-jī: Tâi-ôan-tiān-sī-kong-si), commonly known as TTV and formerly known as Central Television and Voice of Taiwan, is the first terrestrial television station in Taiwan. It was established on April 28, 1962, and began formal broadcasting on October 10, 1962, as a free-to-air channel. It was the first television company established in Taiwan.

During its early years, TTV became known for pioneering a number of popular and innovative television programs. In recent years, the station has experienced a resurgence in viewership following a partnership agreement with Sanlih E-Television to promote and broadcast the latter’s shows. TTV's pop idol dramas have frequently achieved high ratings, though viewership has at times fluctuated depending on the plotlines and the popularity of the cast.

Following the implementation of media reform laws, TTV was designated for privatization in 2007. As of the present, the financial television network Unique Satellite TV holds a majority share in TTV.

Since its founding, TTV has achieved several milestones that have shaped the development of Taiwanese television. These include the production of the first Taiwanese-language television serial and the first Mandarin-language drama anthology series. The station's first costume drama serial, Cheng Ch'eng-kung (1963), starred Ts'ao Chien in the title role. In July 1969, TTV broadcast the Apollo 11 Moon landing live, one of its final major monochrome transmissions before transitioning to colour broadcasting on September 7, 1969.

== Appearances ==
=== Logo history ===
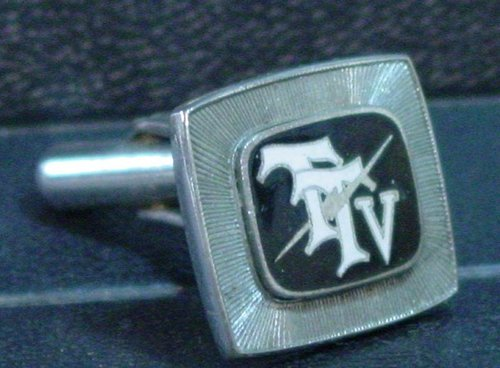
First version of the TTV logo on a cufflink for senior executives

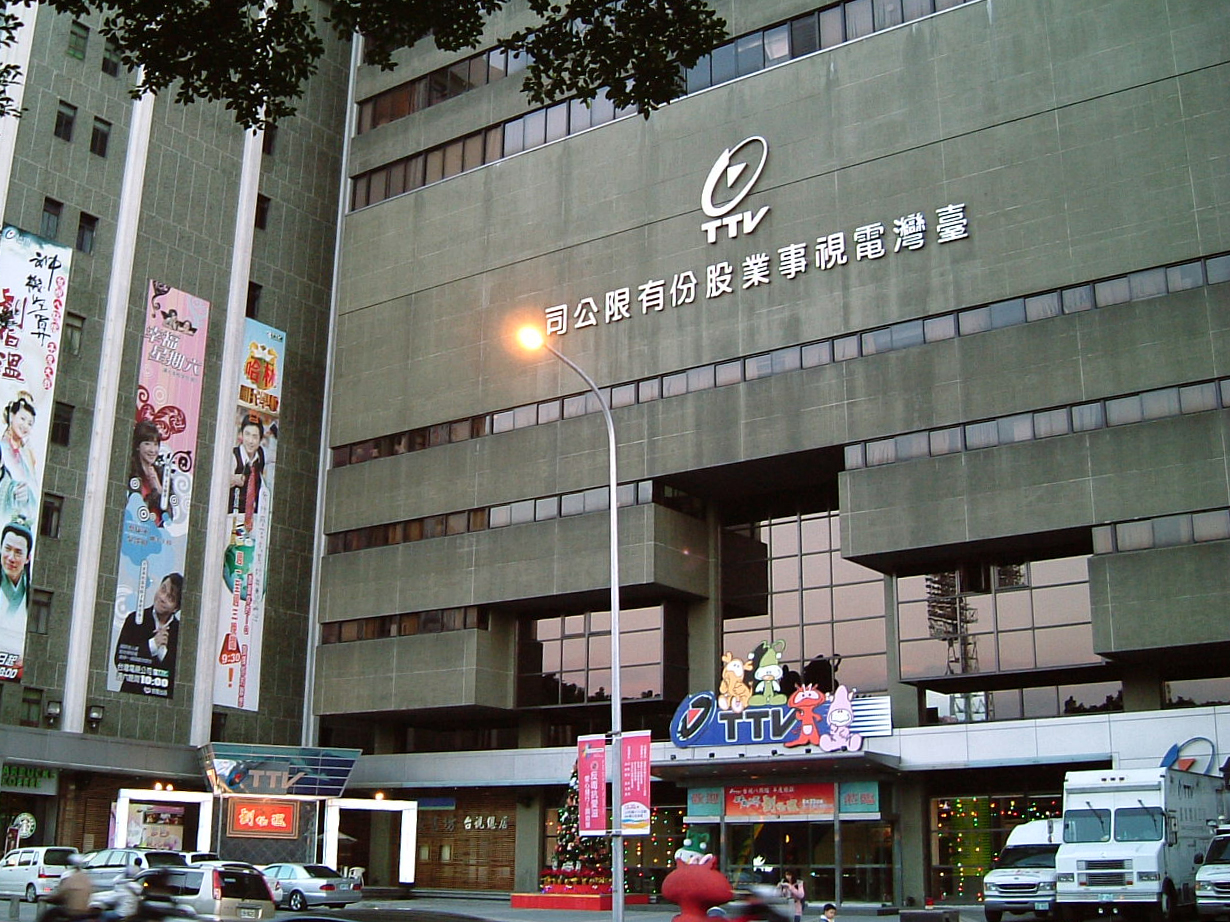
Second version of the TTV logo on the TTV Building

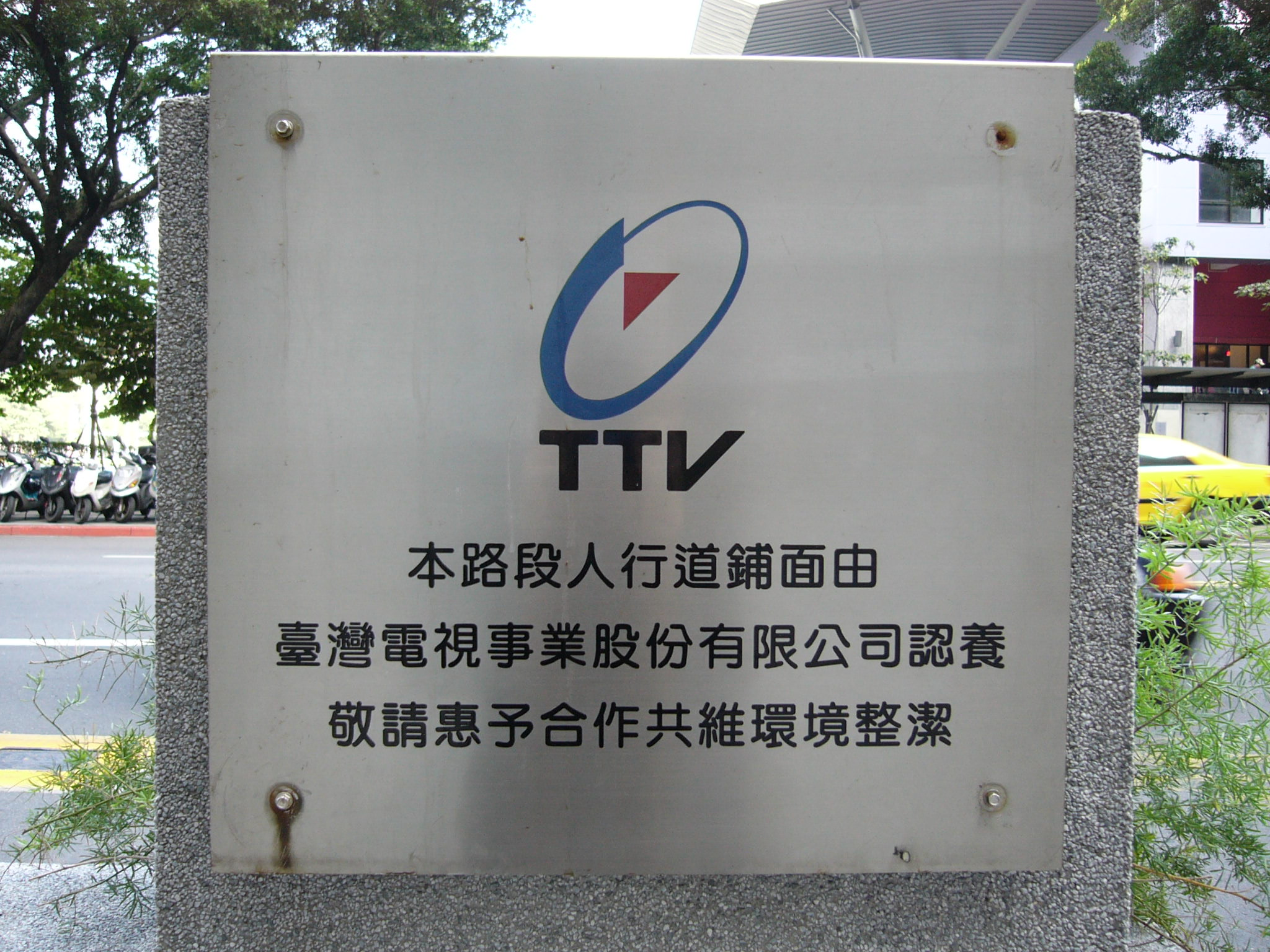
Second version of the TTV logo on Bade Road, Taipei

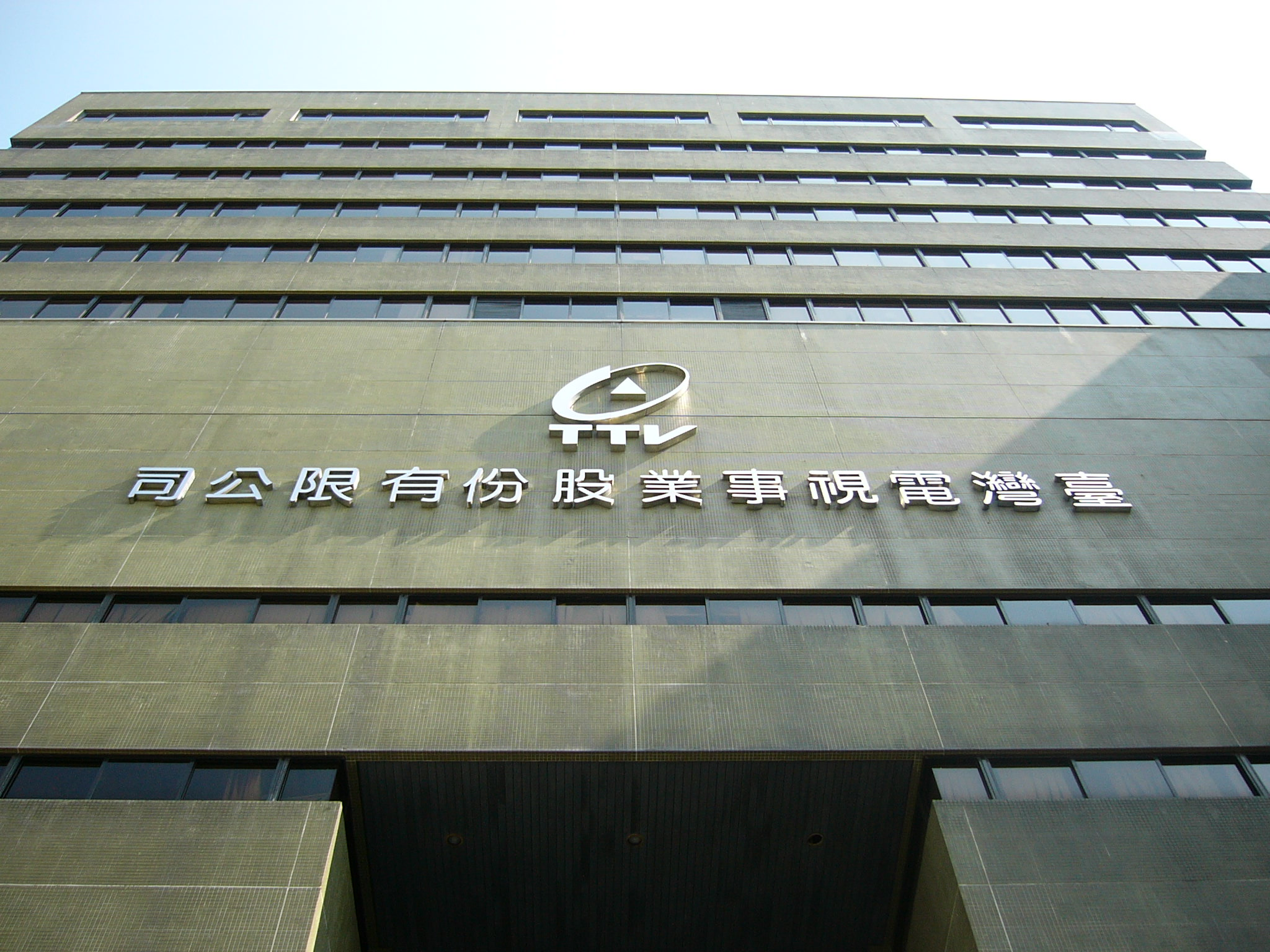
Third version of the TTV logo on the TTV Building

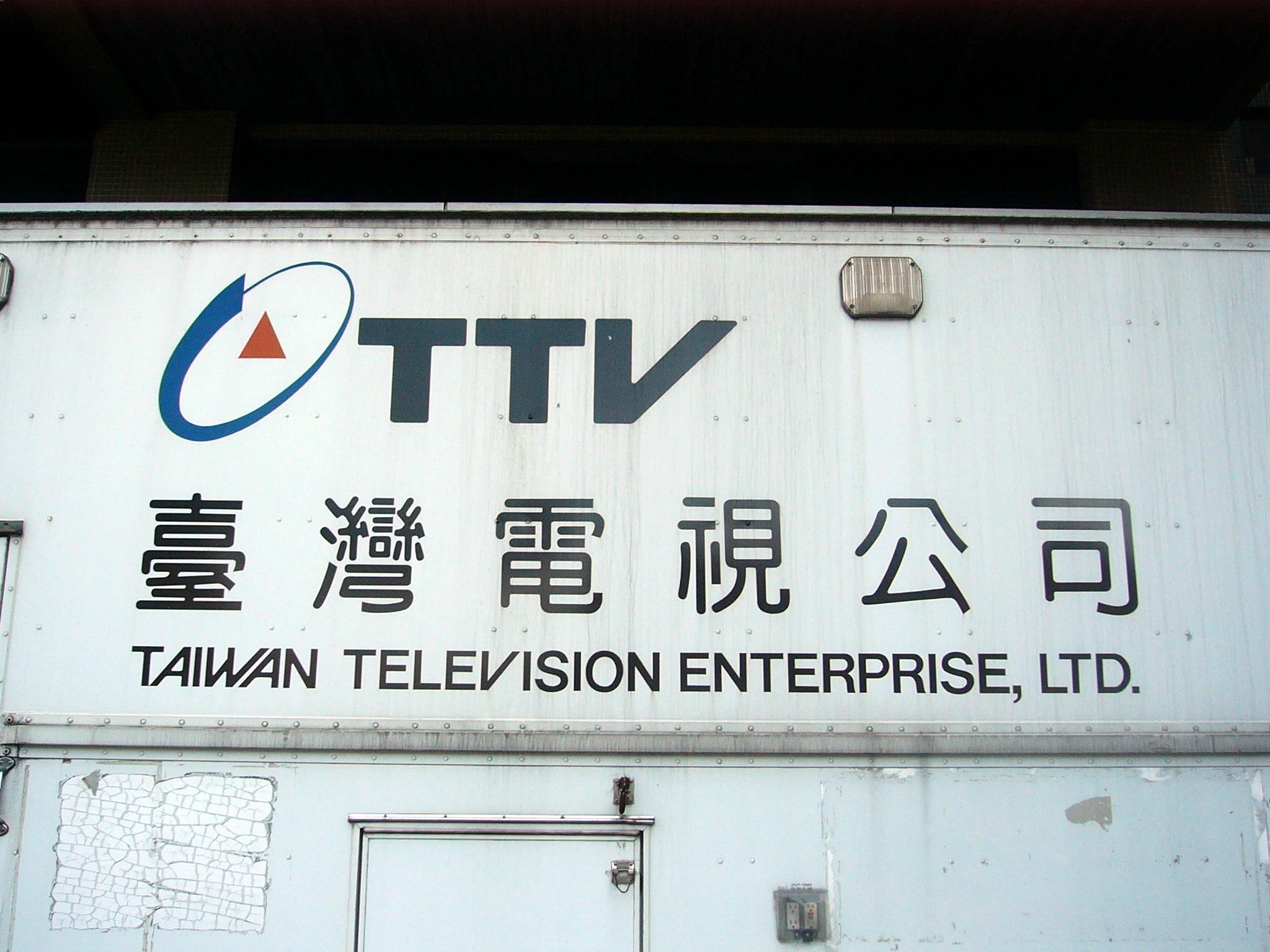
Third version of the TTV logo on a broadcasting vehicle

=== Description ===
Since its establishment in 1962, TTV has used several logo designs. The earliest known logo featured the letters "TTV," with the two Ts connected by a thunderbolt and a small "V" placed below, set against a blue-green-red background. This design remained in use until 1990, when it was replaced by a circular emblem containing an angular triangle symbolising a satellite dish. The 1990 logo was used until July 2008, when it was updated to a revised version featuring the same overall design, but with the triangle repositioned upward.

=== Test card ===
The test card used by TTV is the PM5544 pattern.

== Channels ==
- TTV Main Channel
- TTV News Channel
- TTV Finance
- TTV Variety (formerly TTV Family)
- TTV World (defunct; most of its programming was later sold to third-party broadcasters)

== The TTV shows ==
TTV Mandarin Novels (臺視國語電視小說) was TTV's earliest Mandarin-language drama, broadcast during the 1960s. It served as the predecessor to the modern primetime drama serials that are now shown nightly at 8 p.m.

Star Showcase (羣星會) was one of TTV's earliest variety shows, airing for 15 years from 1962 to 1977. The programme was revived in the early 1990s and again in 2002, though both revivals lasted for less than six months.

Pentalight Talent Show (五燈獎) was Taiwan's longest-running television talent show, airing for 33 years from 1965 to 1998. Several well-known Taiwanese singers began their careers on the programme.

Fu Pei-mei's Chinese Cooking Show (傅培梅時間) was one of TTV's earliest programmes, hosted by culinary expert Fu Pei-mei (1931–2004). It ran for 40 years, from 1962 to 2002.

Taiwanese Opera (楊麗花歌仔戲), a Taiwanese opera television series starring opera performer Yang Li-hua, aired in the early evening slot from 1962 to 1975 and again from 1979 to 1994. Yang also produced many of her own works for the series. In 1994, the show broadcast The Goddess of the Luo River (also known as Mystical Enchantress), which became the first Taiwanese opera series to air in the 8 p.m. primetime slot. A few additional series were produced intermittently between 1996 and 2003. The final production, Ode to Its Successor (2003), received an award at the 2004 Golden Bell Awards.

== See also ==
- List of Taiwanese television series
