= Taiwan Tobacco and Liquor Corporation =

State-owned company in Taiwan

- Native name: 臺灣菸酒股份有限公司
- Company type: State-owned
- Industry: Tobacco and liquor production
- Founded: 1901 (as Monopoly Bureau of the Taiwan Governor's Office); 1945 (as Taiwan Provincial Monopoly Bureau); 1 July 2002 (renamed as Taiwan Tobacco and Liquor Corporation)
- Headquarters: Taipei, Taiwan
- Products: Tobacco and liquor
- Parent: Ministry of Finance (Taiwan)

Chinese name
- Traditional Chinese: 臺灣菸酒股份有限公司
Transcriptions
Standard Mandarin
- Hanyu Pinyin: Táiwān Yānjiǔ Gōngsī
Southern Min
- Hokkien POJ: Tâi-oân Ian-chiú Kong-si
- Website: en.ttl.com.tw

Taiwan Tobacco and Liquor Corporation (TTL; Chinese: 臺灣菸酒股份有限公司; pinyin: Táiwān Yān Jiǔ Gǔfèn Yǒuxiàn Gōngsī), is a state-owned manufacturer and distributor of cigarettes and alcohol, and also formerly (until 2002) a state-sanctioned alcohol beverage brewing and retailing monopoly, in Taiwan. Its most famous product is Taiwan Beer. Other products include wine, Japanese-style liqueurs, Chinese herb liqueurs, and various distilled spirits.

TTL was established as a government agency during Japanese colonial rule and was renamed the Taiwan Tobacco and Wine Monopoly Bureau (菸酒公賣局) in 1947. Between 1947 and 1968, the Bureau exercised a monopoly over all alcohol, tobacco, and camphor products sold in Taiwan. It retained tobacco and alcohol monopolies until Taiwan's entry into the WTO in 2002.

TTL sponsors a semi-professional basketball team, the Taiwan Beer of Super Basketball League.

== History ==
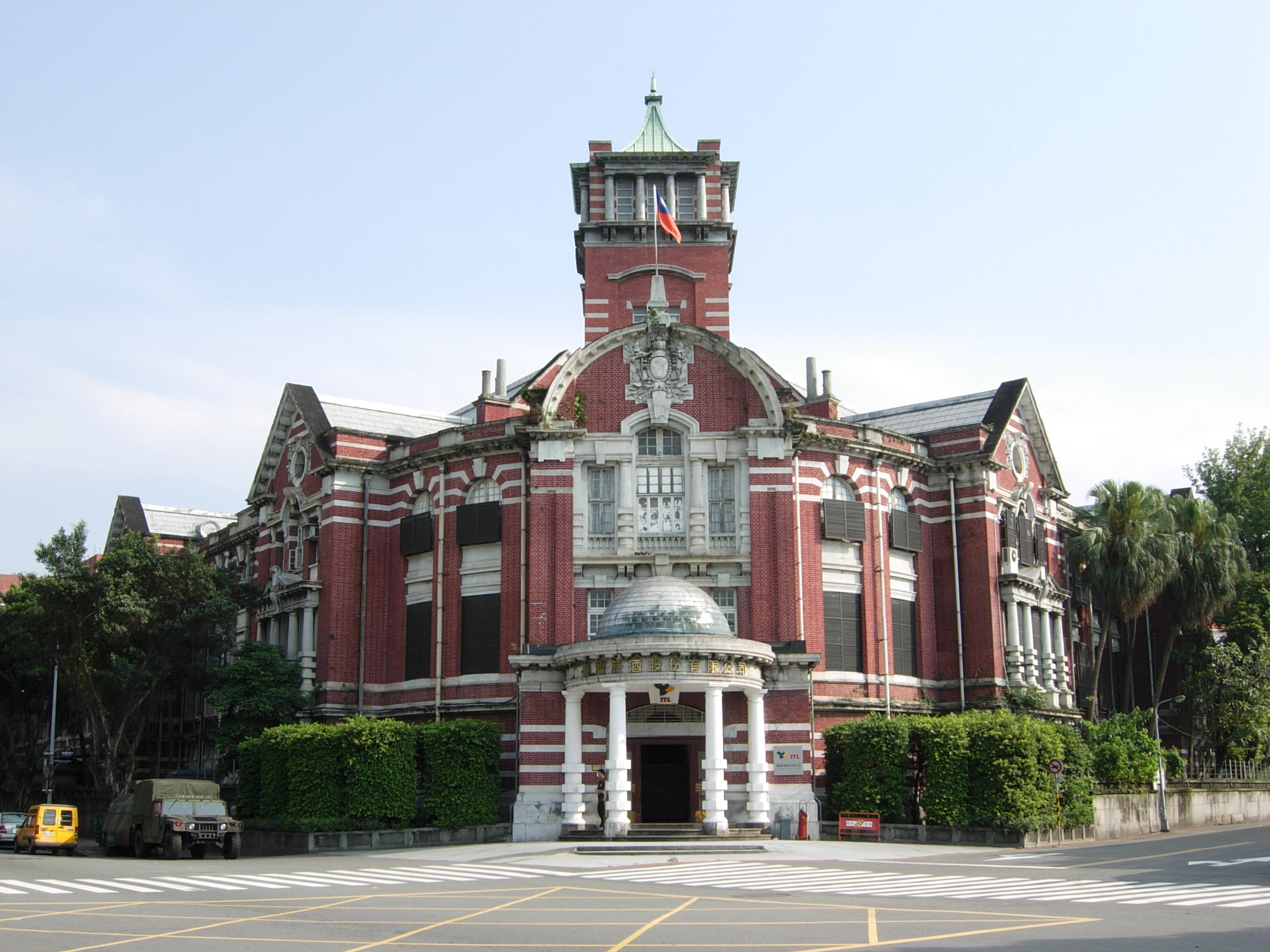
TTL headquarter at the Monopoly Bureau building at Zhongzheng District, Taipei

The company today known as TTL had its origins in a government agency established by Taiwan's Japanese colonial government in 1901. The Monopoly Bureau of the Government-General of Taiwan (Chinese: 臺灣總督府專賣局) was responsible for all liquor and tobacco products in Taiwan as well as opium, salt, and camphor. The Bureau began brewing Takasago Beer in 1922 through the Takasago Malted Beer Company (founded in 1919). Light and dark varieties were offered, though the price of Takasago Beer varied widely over the course of its manufacture depending on the availability of imported Japanese beers and the contingencies of the economy. As World War II reached its conclusion in the 1940s matches, petroleum and standard weights and measures also came under the Monopoly Bureau's authority.

After the war, the incoming Chinese Nationalists preserved the monopoly system for alcohol and tobacco. Production of beer was assigned in 1945 to the Taiwan Provincial Monopoly Bureau (臺灣省專賣局). Takasago Beer was renamed Taiwan Beer in 1946. The following year, production of Taiwan Beer was assigned to the Taiwan Tobacco and Wine Monopoly Bureau (臺灣省菸酒公賣局). In the 1960s locally produced Formosa rice was added to the fermentation process, resulting in the distinctive local flavour for which the beer is known today.

Taiwan entered its modern period of pluralistic democracy in the 1990s. Laws went into force in 2002 as Taiwan prepared for admission to the World Trade Organization (WTO) that opened the Taiwan market to competing products. In 2002 the Monopoly Bureau gave way to its successor, the Taiwan Tobacco and Liquor Corporation (TTL, 臺灣菸酒公司).

As of 2003 TTL has introduced four new Taiwan Beer brews: Gold Medal, Draft, Mine Amber and Mine Dark. Taiwan Beer remains the island's best-selling brew and is one of the most recognized brands in Taiwan's business world.

In 2022 TTL purchased 20,000 bottles of Lithuanian rum which were originally to be shipped to China. The rum was in danger of being denied entry to China because of a diplomatic dispute between Lithuania and China which involved Taiwan.

== Taiwan Beer ==
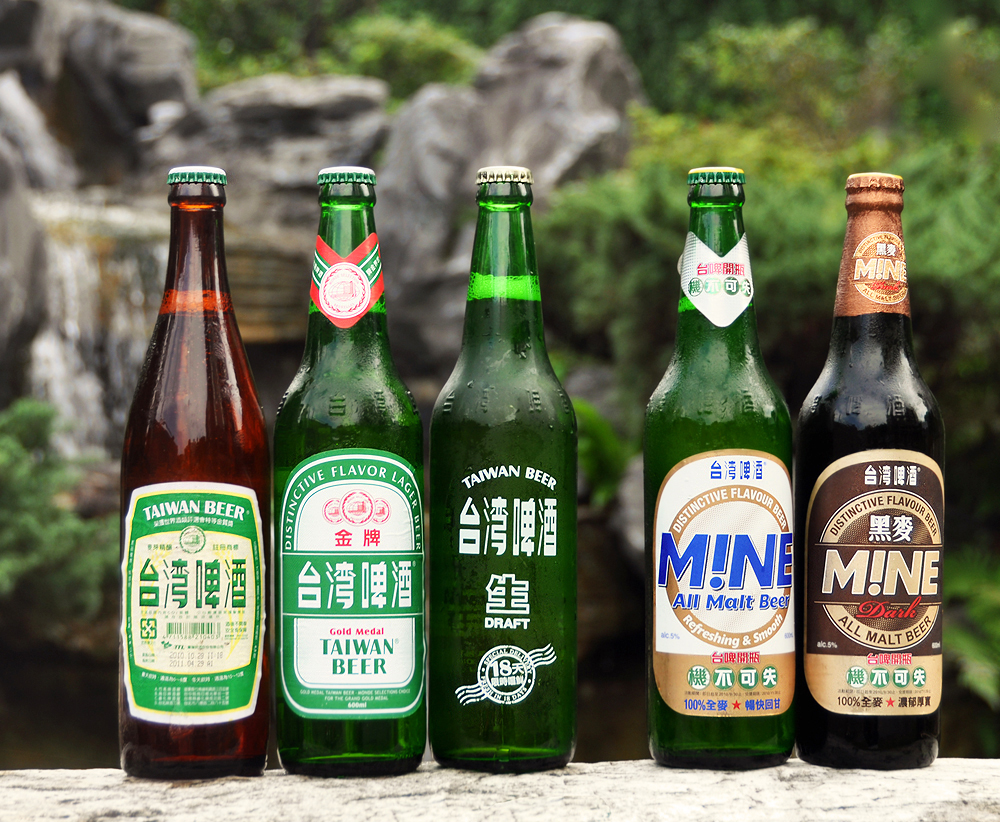
Taiwan Beer sells three lagers (Original, Gold Medal, Draft) and two malts (Mine Amber, Mine Dark)

Taiwan Beer is the main brand of the Taiwan Tobacco and Liquor Corporation. The brand, an icon of Taiwanese culture, began as a monopoly product but has remained the best-selling beer on the island in the era of free trade.

Taiwan Beer has incorporated locally produced ponlai rice in its recipe since the 1960s, giving the beer a distinctive flavour. Taiwan Beer brews have won international awards, including the International Monde Selection in 1977 and the Brewing Industry International Awards in 2002.

Three lager brews, all amber, are sold under the Taiwan Beer brand name. Original and Gold Medal, introduced in April 2003, are 4.5% abv and have a wide domestic distribution. The newest lager, Draft, appears most often in bars and restaurants, where it is available on tap or in its signature solid green bottle. Designed to be sold fresh, it is rarely seen in stores due to its early expiration date.

Taiwan Beer is mass-produced at the Wuri Beer Factory (烏日啤酒廠) in Wuri District, Taichung City. It is also brewed on site at the Taiwan Beer Bar in Taipei.

In 2008, Taiwan Beer began selling malt brews under the Mine label: Mine Amber and Mine Dark. Two special variants of Taiwan Beer, Taiwan Black and Taiwan Red, appeared in 2009.

== Rum ==
Commercial rum production was introduced into Taiwan along with commercial sugar production during the Japanese colonial period and was moved under the monopoly when it was created. Rum production continued under the ROC however it was neglected by TTL. TTL produced Koxinga Gold Rum from local sugar cane until 2002 when they switched to cheaper Thai molasses.

== Whisky ==
In 2018, Taiwan Tobacco and Liquor Corporation introduced a whiskey known as Omar.

== Plants ==
TTL has 9 wineries and distilleries, 4 breweries, and 2 tobacco plants.

== Marketing ==
TTL marketing strategies include advertisements featuring celebrity endorsements by popular Taiwanese figures such as A-Mei. A basketball team named Taiwan Beer, popularly nicknamed 'The Brew Crew,' is sponsored by the company. The Taiwan Beer Bar and Beer Garden is a brewpub in Taipei. The Factory, near the Wujih station of the Taiwan High Speed Rail, is the site of an annual Taiwan Beer Festival (台灣啤酒節) held every summer.

== Gallery of images ==
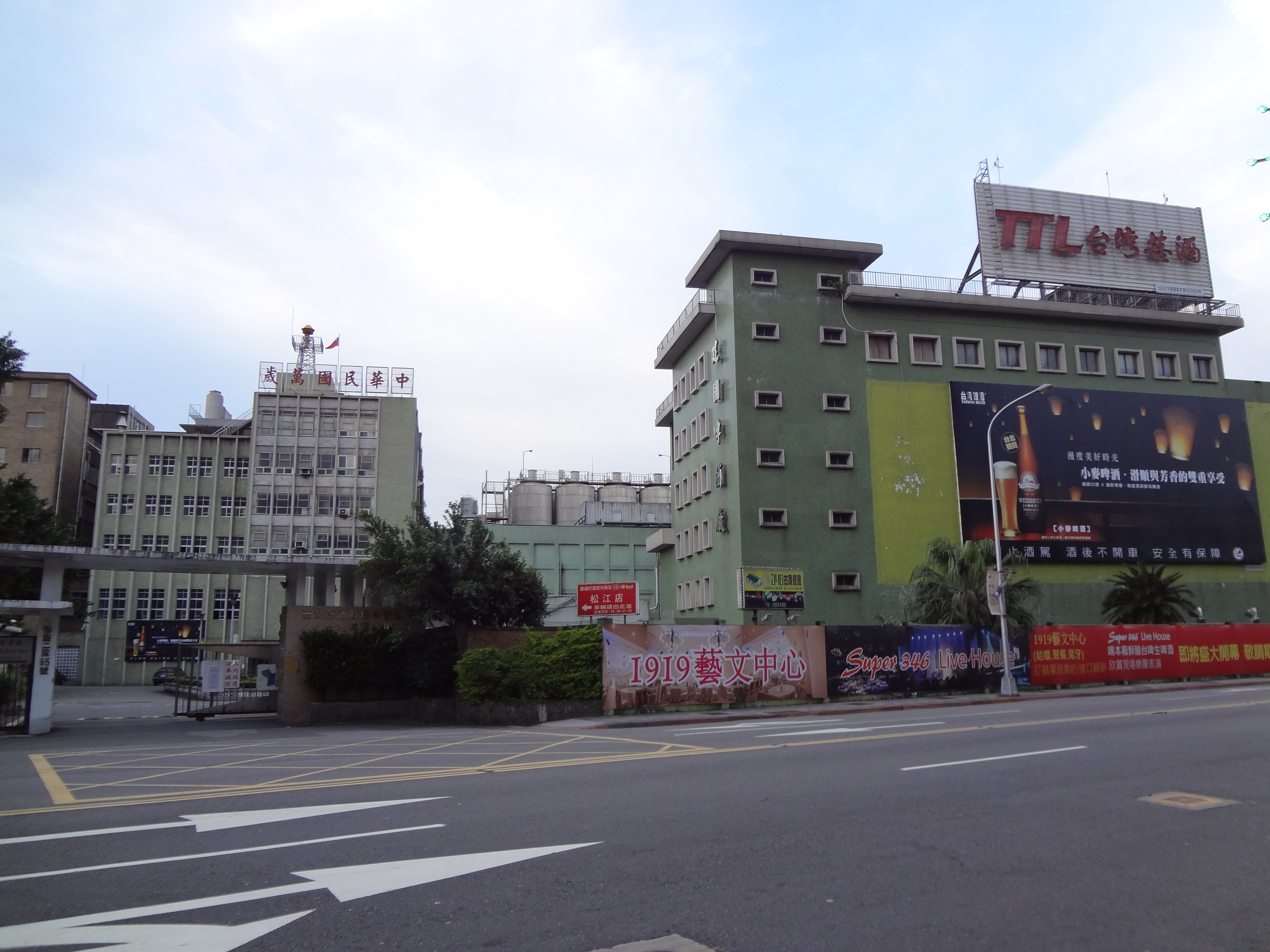
Taipei Beer plant

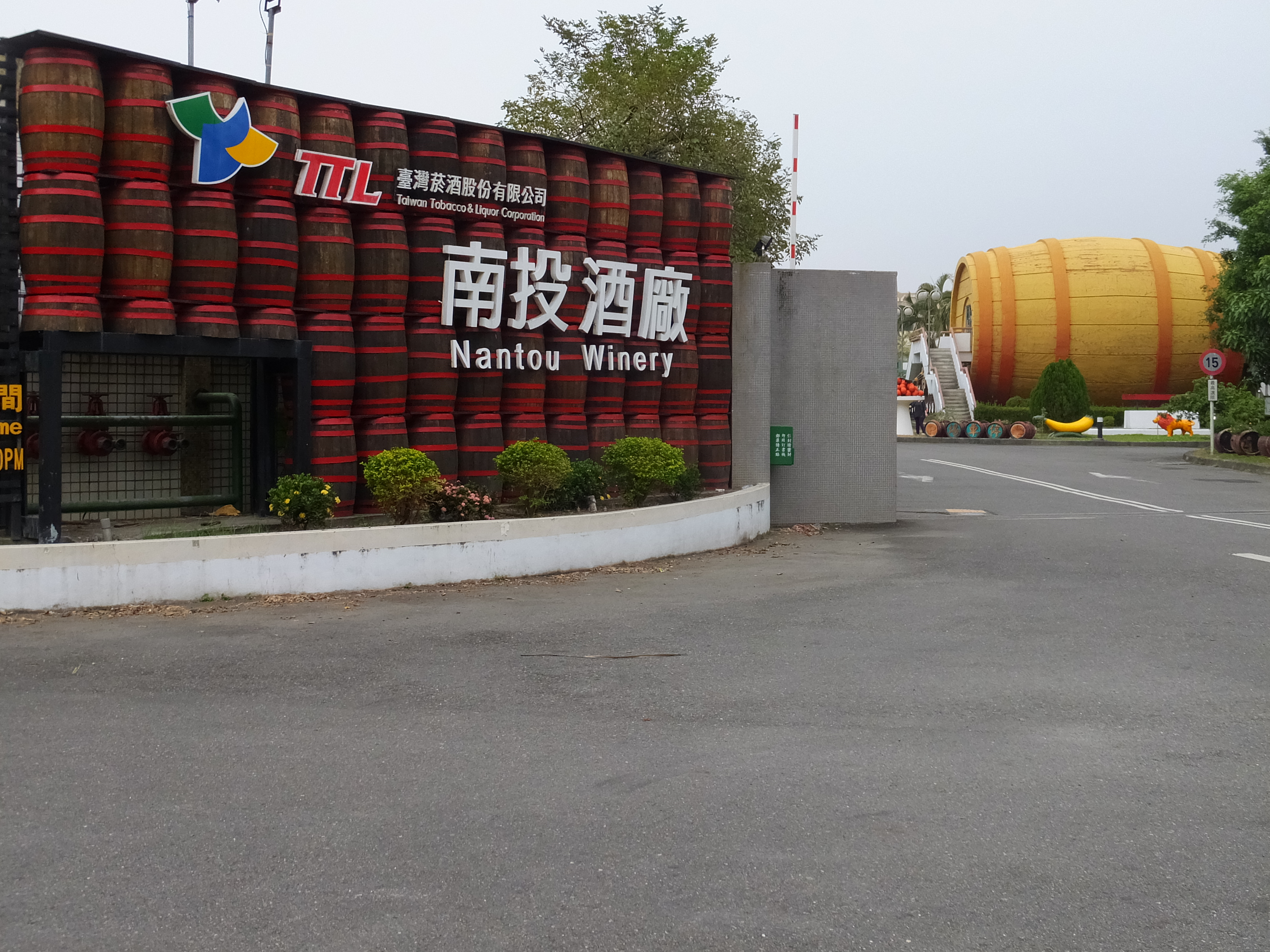
Nantou Winery

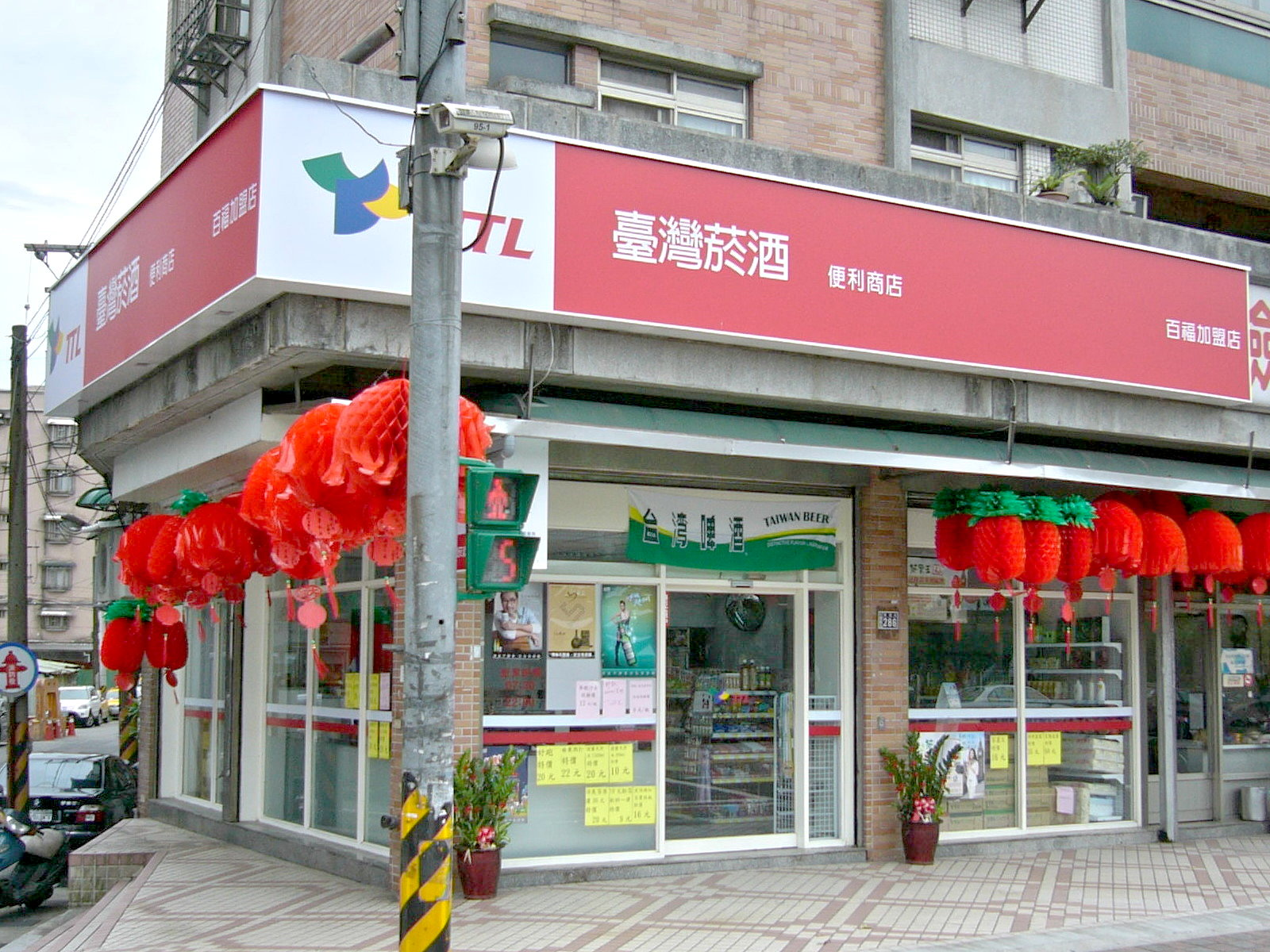
TTL Convenience Store

== See also ==
- Beer in Taiwan
- List of companies of Taiwan
- Taiwanese whisky
- TTL Hua Tiao Chicken Noodles
