= Taiwan Beer =

Taiwanese brand of beer

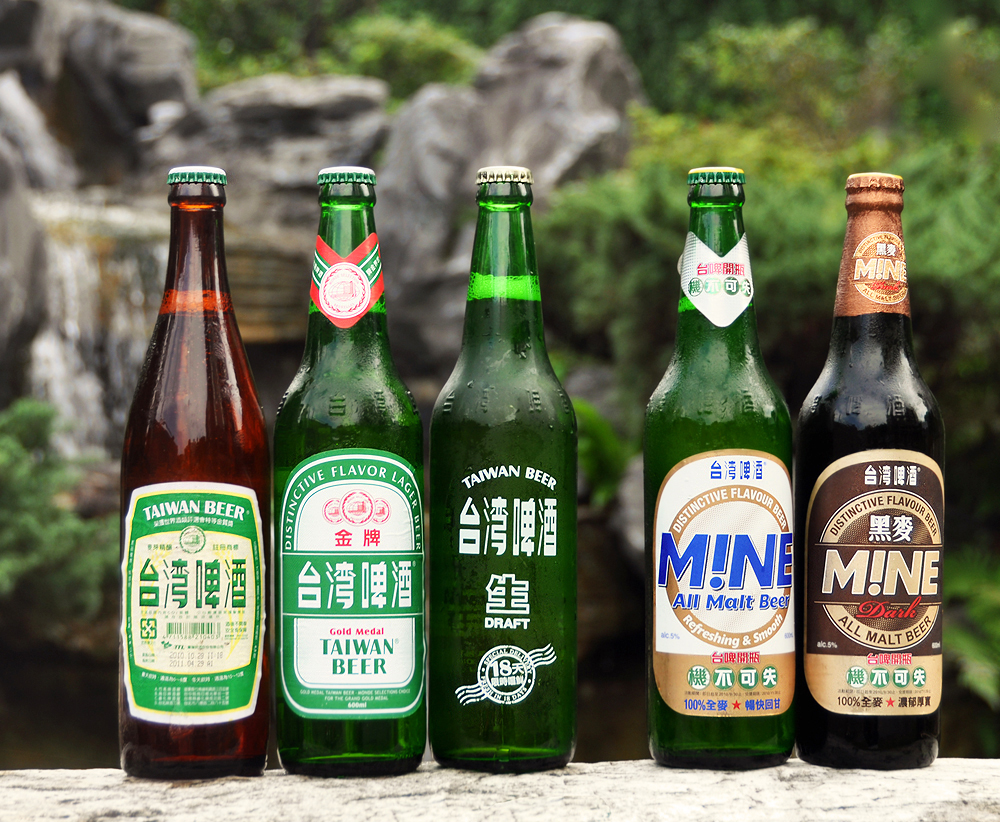
- Taiwan Beer is available in a variety of lager and malt styles
- Type: Beer
- Manufacturer: Taiwan Tobacco and Liquor Corporation (TTL)
- Country of origin: Taiwan
- Style: Lager / Malt
- Website: Taiwan Beer

Taiwan Beer (Chinese: 台灣啤酒; pinyin: Táiwān Píjǐu, or 台啤; TáiPí) is a brand of mass market beer brewed by the Taiwan Tobacco and Liquor Corporation (TTL). The brand is an icon of Taiwanese culture and is applied to the best-selling beer in the country.

== History ==
=== Japanese colonial period ===
The company known today as TTL has its origins in a government agency established by Taiwan's Japanese rulers in 1901. Initially, the Monopoly Bureau of the Taiwan Governor's Office was responsible for all opium, salt, and camphor sold in Taiwan. In 1905, tobacco was added to the list of monopolised commodities and products.

In 1907, the Japanese colonial government began taxing liquor producers to create a new revenue stream. The government then remodelled the whole of Taiwan's liquor industry, and set up much needed infrastructure and training.

Subsequently, in 1919, the Takasago Malted Beer Company, developer and owner of Taiwan's first brewery, was established by Konosuke Abe and other investors, including figures from the Japanese wine industry, with a capital investment of two million Japanese yen. "Takasago" is the word that, since Japan's Edo period, had served as the customary Japanese name for Taiwan.

The company's first brewery was erected in the then Kamihito District of Taipei. It was built using the same type of bricks as those of the nearby Governor-General's office (now the Presidential Office Building); most of its equipment had been acquired second hand from an old brewery in Hawaii. Upon completion, it was more than 13,000 m^{2} (140,000 sq ft) in area (about the size of a football field), and was one of only three beer breweries in Asia, the others being the Sapporo Brewery in Japan and the Tsingtao Brewery in China.

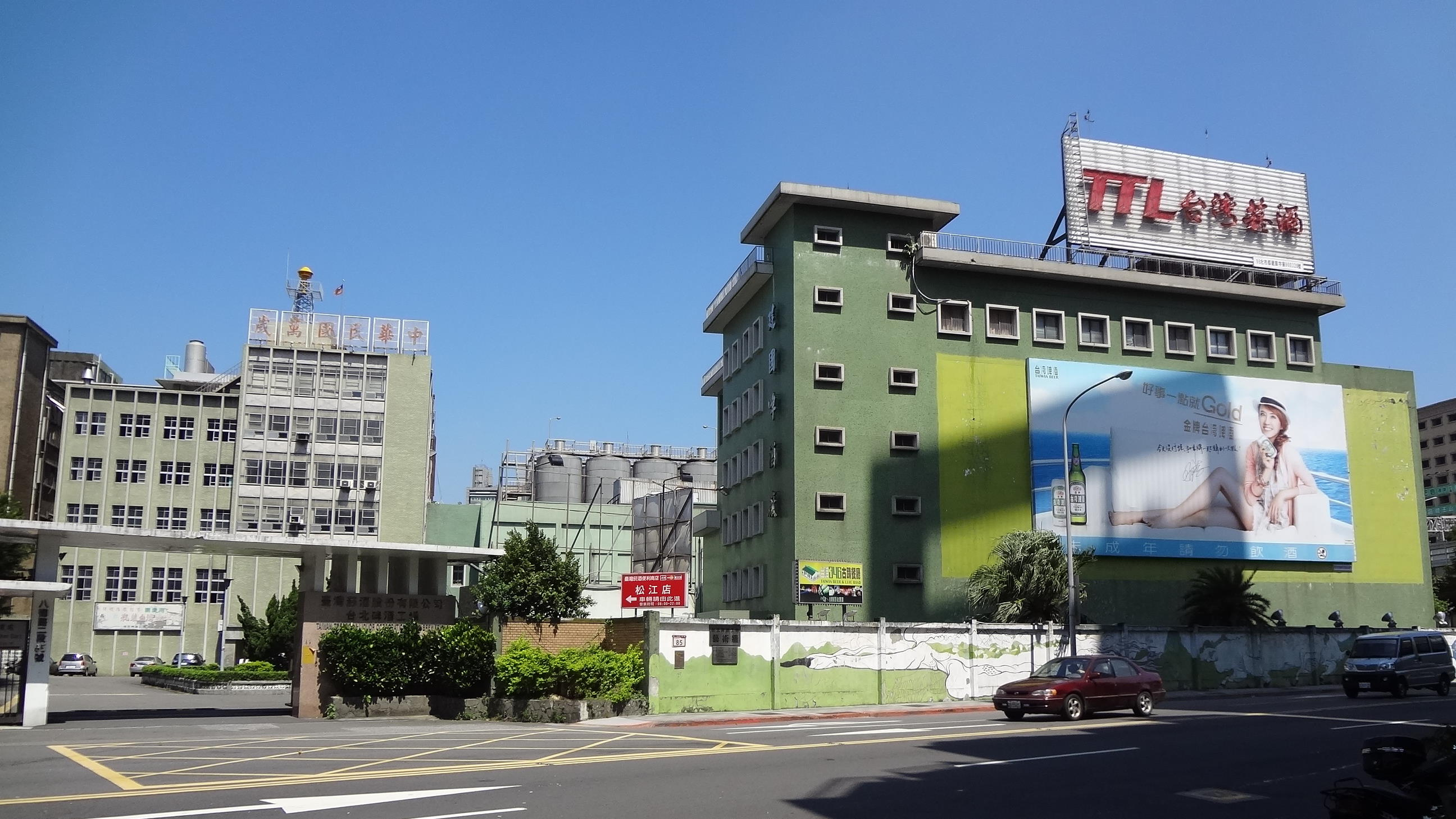
The first brewery in 2013

In its early years, the brewery was operated by Japanese brew masters. Its product, an ale (as opposed to a lager) first brewed in June 1920, was marketed as Takasago Beer (Chinese: 高砂麥酒), and was made in two styles, namely light malt and dark malt.

The investors' original plan was to export the company's product, but its initial quality was inferior to that of Japanese beers, and early export results were unsatisfactory. The company therefore decided to enjoy tax exemptions by selling Takasago Beer locally; beer was not yet then covered by any monopoly in Taiwan.

In 1922, under the influence of a post-World War I depression, the government attempted to nationalise the liquor industry by placing it under the exclusive control of the Monopoly Bureau. At that time, however, Taiwan had a highly competitive market for imported Japanese beers, and importers successfully lobbied members of the Imperial Diet to spare beer from the monopoly program.

Takasago Beer soon became very popular amongst Japanese drinkers in Taiwan, who preferred it to saké because it was a better thirst quencher during Taiwan's burdensome summers. With the support of a network of Takasago beer houses and advertising on billboards in Taiwan's major cities, Takasago Beer developed a big following in the 1920s. By 1925, it was Taiwan's leading brand of beer. Exports of the product to Tokyo began to rival Sapporo Beer, the leading Japanese brand.

Eventually, in 1933, the local market beer monopoly was reintroduced, with effect from July of that year. Over 200 liquor industry businesses were shut down, and private brewing was banned. The Monopoly Bureau began a practice of purchasing the local market products of Takasago Malted Beer Company in batches and then reselling them; the company also continued to export some of its products.

Although by then its competitiveness in terms of productivity and quality had improved from its early days, the company was still a long way short of profitability, and relied upon the monopoly to cover its losses.

Under the local market monopoly regime, beer was expensive. Most Taiwanese had trouble finding enough food, and could not afford to drink beer, bottles of which were so costly that the asking price is known to have exceeded the price of pork. The company's business of selling costly beer boomed, and even the Bank of Taiwan chose to invest in it. The company also secured the support of the major Japanese breweries in obtaining raw materials. Merchants vied for local market distributors and vendors licences issued by the Monopoly Bureau, and corruption was reported to be rife. The Monopoly Bureau could rely upon a variety of excuses to revoke such a licence.

During World War II, Allied airstrikes badly damaged Taiwan's liquor-producing facilities. Production was very substantially reduced. Meanwhile, in the early 1940s, matches, petroleum, and standard weights and measures also came under the Monopoly Bureau's authority.

=== Post-World War II period ===
After the war, the incoming Chinese Nationalists set up the Taiwan Provincial Administrative Office, which preserved the monopoly system by establishing the "Taiwan Provincial Monopoly Bureau", and also took over the assets of the hitherto privately owned brewery. Takasago Beer was renamed Taiwan Beer in 1946. The following year, the Administrative Office's successor, the Taiwan Provincial Government, reorganised the monopoly system, by forming the Taiwan Tobacco and Wine Monopoly Bureau. Simultaneously, the number of monopolised items was reduced; from then onwards, only tobacco and alcohol remained, together with camphor until 1968.

The sudden departure of Taiwan's Japanese brewers in 1945 led to a lack of brewing expertise on the island. The government therefore promptly sent some of its employees to Germany to study beer brewing. That decision may have led to the replacement of the island's thick, malty pre-World War II ales with the light, bright, crisp and sweet German-style lagers that have been brewed as Taiwan Beer ever since the brand's name change.

In the late 1940s, after the Chinese Nationalists had lost the civil war in China, more than 800,000 of them retreated to Taiwan, where they came to account for around 10% of the population. That influx, combined with the departure of Japanese nationals, led to changes in consumer preferences, but initially demand for beer was not much affected.

The Korean War (1950–1953) led to an intensification of the cooperation between the USA and the Chinese Nationalists. The USA funded several important aid programs in Taiwan between 1950 and 1965. Many American advisors and military personnel were stationed on the island during that period, especially after the signing of the Sino-American Mutual Defense Treaty in 1954, and their presence caused a beer sales boom.

During the 1960s, domestically produced ponlai (or penglai) rice ("Formosa rice" 蓬萊米) was added to Taiwan Beer's fermentation process, resulting in the distinctive local flavour for which the beer is known today. The recipe was altered not only to make the brew sweeter and less bitter, but also to absorb a surplus of locally produced rice that was suppressing prices and thus limiting the incomes of farmers. Adding rice to the brew also lowered production costs.

In 1964, the Monopoly Bureau responded to an increase in demand for beer by cooperating with Dominion Breweries of New Zealand in learning, practising and adopting the patented brewing technique of continuous fermentation.

In November 1965, Taiwan became part of the Rest and Recuperation (R&R) program, under which US military personnel could take a short vacation in a number of places in Asia. From then until the program ended in April 1972, almost 250,000 Americans had a vacation in Taiwan. A new industry of American-style bars emerged on the island, and thousands of women were employed to serve beer and other alcoholic beverages, and otherwise entertain bar guests. Soon after the American forces pulled out of Vietnam, the Taiwanese American-style bar industry vanished.

Meanwhile, the Monopoly Bureau constructed new breweries, in Wuri District, Taichung City, in 1966, and then in Shanhua District, Tainan, in 1973. To meet public demand, it introduced canned beer in 1975. Also in 1975, Taiwan Beer's brewery complex in Taipei was renamed as the Jianguo Brewery (transl. nation-building brewery). It has since been renamed again, and is now known as the Taipei Brewery.

During the 1980s, an important new type of drinking establishment, the beerhouse, appeared in Taiwan. The first one opened in Taipei in 1983, and there were soon many more, in that city and others. Typically constructed in a log cabin-style, beerhouses appealed to the Taiwanese fascination for western culture. Patrons would hang out in beerhouses after work and late at night, drinking beer and eating local dishes, such as fried clams, fried crab legs and snails. However, beerhouses were also controversial, and by the end of the decade enthusiasm for them had waned.

=== Democratic era ===
In 1987 Taiwan lifted martial law and, under pressure from the US government, opened its beer market to foreign imports from America and Europe. Up to that point Taiwan Beer held 99% of the market. Not long after that year, imports from Japan and Southeast Asia were also permitted. However, the local brews were initially protected by high tariffs.

In 1991–92, production of Taiwan Beer reached its absolute peak of 144 million bottles per annum, and in the latter year modern automated computer-controlled production and environmental protection equipment was installed at the Taipei Brewery. However, imported beers gradually increased their market share, and competition between them and Taiwan Beer became very intense.

Taiwan entered its modern period of pluralistic democracy in the 1990s. Free trade and open markets became priorities as Taiwan prepared for admission to the World Trade Organization (WTO) in 2002, and the government found itself under outside pressure to liberalise markets. At the start of that year, laws fully opening Taiwan's liquor market to competing products went into force, and the already reduced tariffs were eliminated.

In July 2002, the Monopoly Bureau was corporatised and renamed Taiwan Tobacco and Liquor Corporation (TTL). That year, Chinese beers were permitted to be imported into Taiwan, and foreign beers reached a peak of 26% of the market. However, TTL's marketing strategies have since regained some of Taiwan Beer's market share.

In the two decades leading up to the start of the 2010s, advertising for Taiwan Beer focused on its freshness; towards the end of that period, TTL also introduced several new beer styles, and a new logo, bottle design and commercial campaign for "Gold Medal", the brand's most popular style.

During the 2000s, TTL also took steps to introduce Taiwan Beer to the Chinese market. Initially, its efforts to register the Taiwan Beer brand as a trademark were thwarted several times in reliance upon China's trademark law, which forbade the registration of a geographical name as part of a trademark. The necessary procedures for Taiwan Beer to be sold in China were finally completed in 2009, after several years of negotiations. Within two months, TTL started shipping Taiwan Beer to China; the following year, the corporation began brewing the product in Jiangsu Province.

Taiwan Beer remains the island's best-selling beer brand and is one of the most recognised brands in Taiwan's business world. However, according to figures released by Taiwan's Ministry of Finance, its market share has dropped dramatically in recent years, from nearly 85% in 2009 to only 70% in 2015 and just 60% in 2019, in each case by volume.

== Beers ==
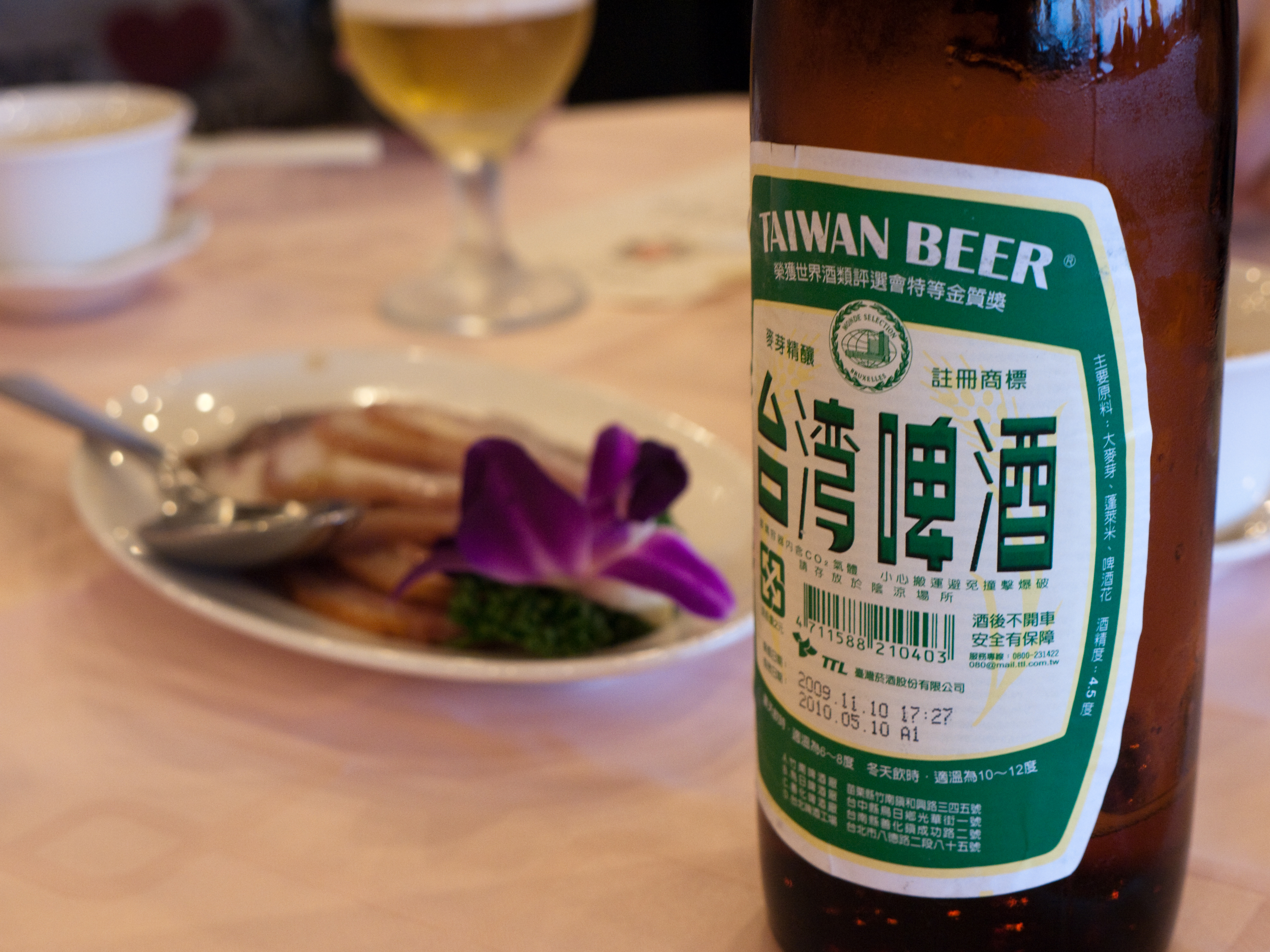
Classic Taiwan Beer

The best selling of the many styles of Taiwan Beer are amber lager beers brewed along pilsner lines. They have a distinct character and flavour, generated by the addition of locally produced ponlai rice to the malt during the fermentation process.

The rice imparts both a smoothness and a sweetness, and has been said by one reviewer to add "... a certain umami and sake-like note not found in most Asian lagers."

Like all mass market beers, the popular styles of Taiwan Beer are filtered and pasteurised. They are mass-produced at four locations, namely the original Jianguo Brewery in Taipei, the Shanhua Brewery in Shanhua District, Tainan, the Wuri Brewery in Wuri District, Taichung City, and the Zhunan Brewery in Zhunan, Miaoli County. Some styles are also brewed on-site at the Taiwan Beer Bar, a brewpub in Taipei.

Taiwan Beer is served cold and best complements Taiwanese and Japanese cuisine, especially seafood dishes such as sushi and sashimi. It has won international awards, including the Monde Selection many times since 1997, and the Brewing Industry International Awards in 2002. It has also been exported successfully to China, the United States, Japan, Korea, France, New Zealand, Australia, Singapore and Cambodia.

Several lager-style brews bear the label Taiwan Beer. The original brew, now known as "Classic", is sold in brown bottles with a green and white label, and in white cans bearing a blue striped design with green lettering. A rough-and-ready concoction rated at 4.5% ABV, it is made to a recipe dating from the 1960s.

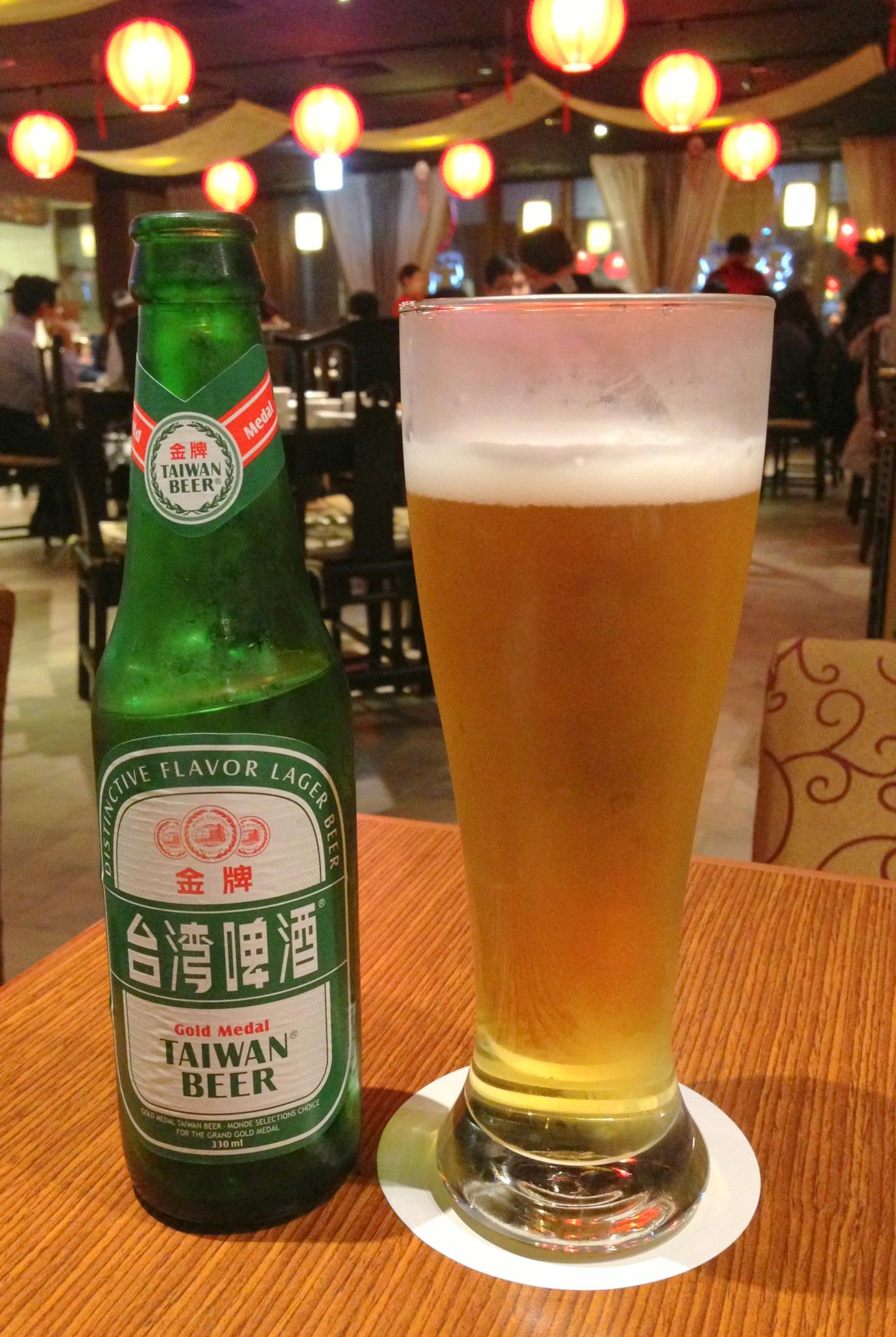
Gold Medal Taiwan Beer

The "Gold Medal" brew, which was introduced in April 2003 and became Taiwan Beer's top-selling style that year, has a higher maltose content than "Classic", and therefore a smoother taste. It also uses a larger proportion of ponlai rice and aromatic hops, which give it "a fresh and clean aroma".

"Gold Medal" is rated at 5% ABV. It is sold in green bottles, and in cans that reproduce the white, red, and green label seen on the bottle. Its more refined and rounded flavour was intended to appeal to younger drinkers. In May 2004, TTL hired 144 Taiwan Beer girls to promote it in restaurants and small pubs, and also in fashionable pubs and night clubs where the brand had not previously been able to make much headway.

Both of the first two lagers are mainstream styles also regularly seen in Taiwan's convenience and grocery stores.

The brand has also introduced craft style lager brews. "Premium" is a 5% ABV European pale lager brewed at low temperature using 100% Munich malt. It is marketed in brown bottles with a gold and white label, and in gold and white cans. "18 Day Draft", unusually, is unpasteurised, and therefore retains the nutritional value of its yeast while also tasting fresher. It was introduced to the range in 2003, after visitors to Taiwan Beer breweries had commented favourably on the flavour, mouthfeel and smoothness of freshly brewed unpasteurised beer they had been permitted to sample during brewery tours. Rated at 5% ABV, it is sold in signature solid green bottles with no paper label, and also in green cans. It is designed to be sold freshly brewed, and is not often seen in stores, as it expires just 18 days after production.

In 2008, Taiwan Beer began selling an amber malt brew bearing the "Mine" label. "Mine" bottles are green with white, gold and blue labels, and cans are white, gold and blue. The following year, the "Mine" brew was joined by "Mine Dark". Both "Mine" malts are 5% ABV.

More recently, in 2013, a wheat beer, Taiwan Beer Weissbier, was added to the lineup; it is 5% ABV, and is sold in brown 600ml bottles with white and bronze labels, and white 330ml cans with similar artwork.

Further beverages marketed under the Taiwan Beer brand include stouts, "fruit beers" (mango, pineapple, grape and orange; 2.8% ABV), alcohol-free beers, and non-alcoholic flavoured beers. Amongst other new products, Taiwan Beer has launched the "Brew Lab" series "for refined tastes", the "Sweet Touch" series of fresh local fruit juices blended with beer/wine, and "Gold Medal Free", a non-alcoholic beer for drivers.

The fruit beers were introduced after foreign brewers started building factories in Taiwan, a move that negated Taiwan Beer's hitherto competitive advantage of freshness in its local market. The initial idea was to create beer styles that included 'Taiwan flavours', being the flavours of agricultural products characteristic of the island, which is a leading fruit producer. TTL also hoped that fruit beers would be lighter, more refreshing, and would attract more female consumers. The fruits chosen included Irwin mangoes from Yujing District in Tainan, Golden Diamond pineapples from Guanmiao, also in Tainan, and Black Queen grapes from Erlin in Changhua County.

The manufacture of fruit beer is not a simple process. The pectin in the fruit juice must be removed, as it would increase the beer's viscosity and accelerate the process of oxidisation; pineapple juice must also be heated to destroy enzymes that would break down protein in the beer. The R&D team at the Wuri Brewery carried out many experiments with the temperature, humidity and pressure of subsequent processes to formulate the best methods of making the fruit beers, which have been much appreciated and generated positive reviews.

== Culture ==
Taiwan Beer is a national icon strongly identified with Taiwanese culture, and a symbol of local resilience and pride. During a trade dispute with the People's Republic of China in December 2022, the Minister of Foreign Affairs of Taiwan, Joseph Wu, even described it as "... the great taste of freedom". Another view of the brand, as expressed by a Taiwanese private sector website, is:

"Táiwān Píjǐu (Taipi for short) represents a side of Taiwan that doesn’t make it into glossy tourist brochures and feel-good TV advertising. Taipi stands for the quotidian, the earthy, and the comfortable—it certainly isn’t high-falutin’ culture, but it is strongly identified with the real Taiwan, beyond the shiny skyscrapers of the capital or concerts of classical Chinese music."

The brand's iconic status in Taiwan is reinforced by TTL marketing strategies. Advertisements have featured Taiwanese celebrities such as rock guitarist Wu Bai, who was appointed as the public face of Taiwan Beer in 1998, and diva A-Mei, who became a spokesmodel for the brand in 2006.

Two basketball teams, one a Super Basketball League outfit named Taiwan Beer (popularly nicknamed 'The Brew Crew'), and another one, which competes in the T1 League under the name TaiwanBeer HeroBears, are sponsored by the brand. So too is the Taiwan Beer baseball team, which TTL established and operates in cooperation with the National Taiwan Sport University.

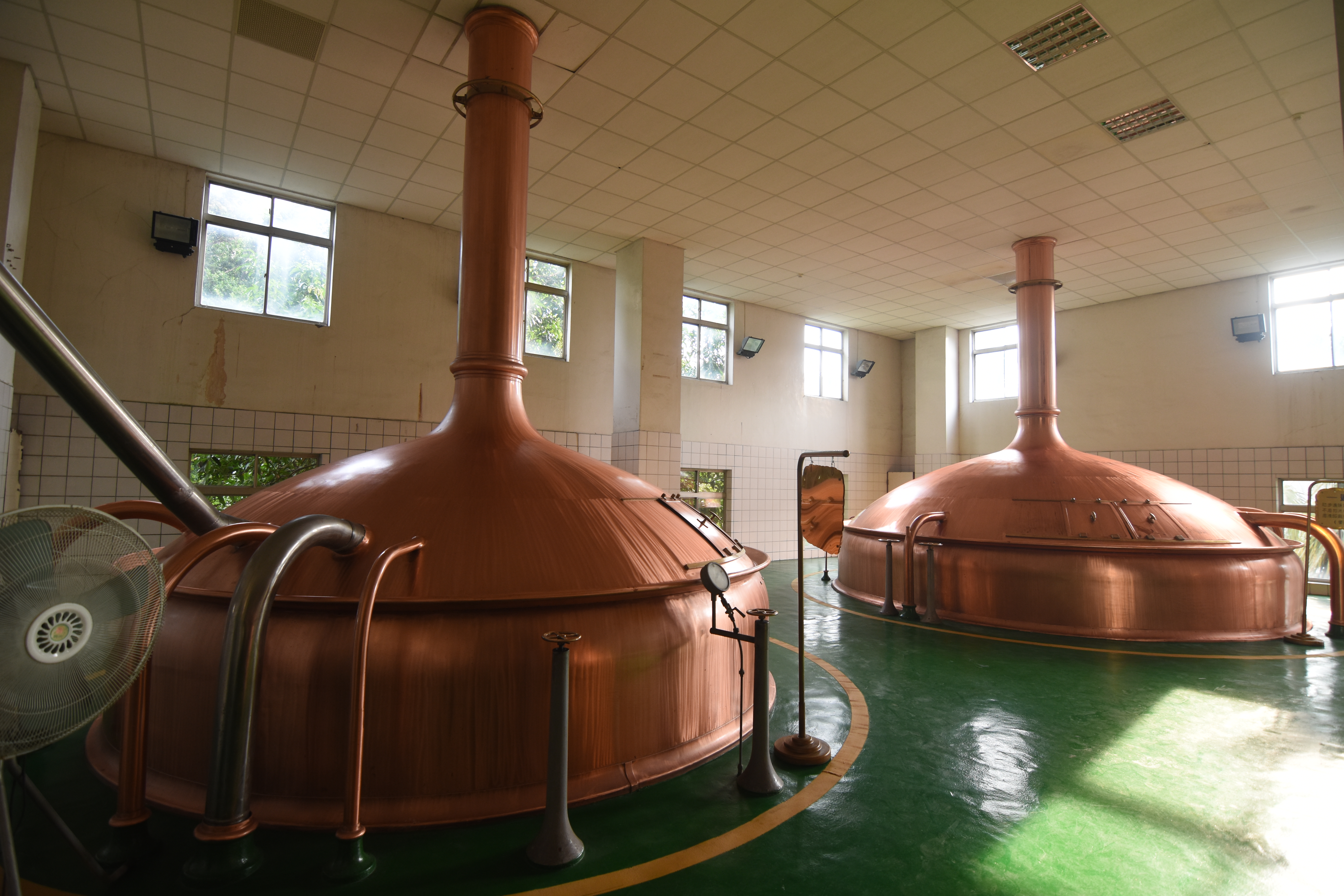
Some of the Taipei Brewery's original mash tuns in 2017

The oldest industrial plant that produces the brand, the Jianguo Brewery complex in Taipei, is now more than a century old. It has been designated by the Taipei City Government as an historic site, for its historical and architectural value. The complex is made up of two large buildings, a red-brick one and a green-tiled one, flanked by a number of smaller wooden-framed and other structures. Inside the buildings, modern automated items of equipment, including stainless steel mash tuns, are in operation. The walls of the Taipei brewery are decorated with black-and-white photographs depicting earlier methods of production. The original copper mash tuns are no longer used, but remain in place as drawcards for tourists.

In the 21st century, the four TTL breweries have become tourist attractions as well as factories. As of 2023, TTL had plans to transform the Taipei brewery into a beer culture district park; the Shanhua Brewery was offering taste tests of fruit beers; the Wuri Brewery was expected to become the site of a Taiwan Beer brand experience centre; and the Zhunan Brewery was already operating concurrently as a Hakka culture promotion centre.

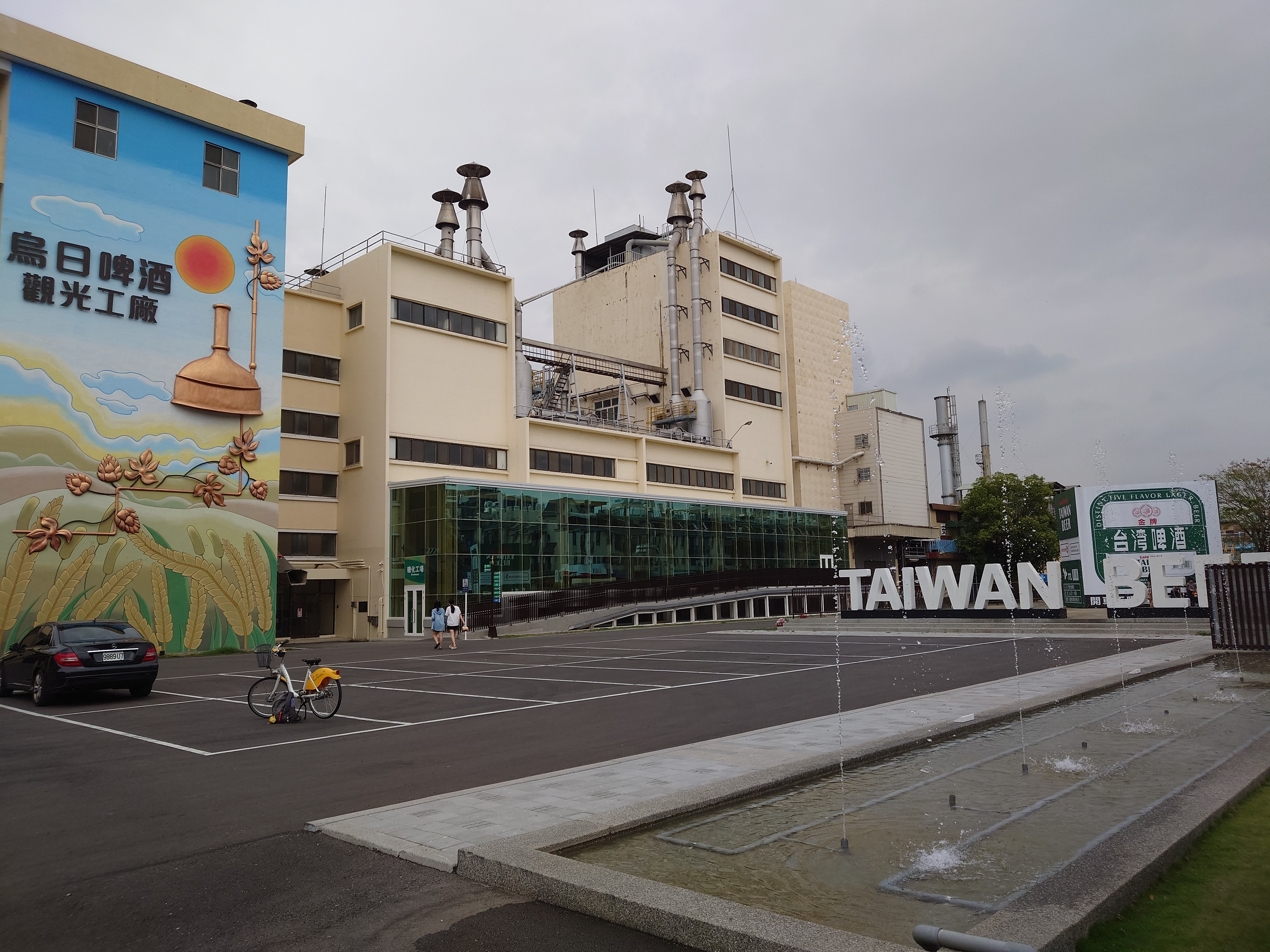
The Wuri Brewery sightseeing facility in 2023

Restaurants and nightspots proliferate at the 'beer village' adjacent to the Wuri Brewery, which has become the centre of Taiwan's beer culture. After the nearby Taichung station on the Taiwan High Speed Rail was opened in January 2007, the Taichung City government teamed up with the Taichung High Speed Rail Tourism Development Association to transform Guanghua Street, on which the brewery is located, into a beer tourist street. It was officially opened in August 2008. Inside the brewery is a shop/visitor centre that includes an exhibition hall detailing the beer brewing process, and describing both the history of Taiwan Beer, and the history of beer as far back as 5000 BCE.

Additionally, the Wuri beer village has been a site of the annual Taiwan Beer Festival (台灣啤酒節, Táiwān Píjiǔjié), which is held in summer.

There is also the Taiwan Beer Bar and Beer Garden brewpub in Taipei. It has received mixed reviews: one reviewer praised the bar as a "light airy space" and the beer garden as "really worth a visit", while another writer dismissed the bar as having "something of a crude beer hall ambience", albeit with "the cheapest beer you can hope to find on the island".

== Competition ==
Taiwan Beer leads its namesake market. Its main mass market competitor is Long Chuan, which is brewed in Neipu, a rural township near Kaohsiung City. Long Chuan launched a range of "fruit beers" in 2012, and Taiwan Beer's introduction of a similar range was a response to that launch. In June 2022, Dutch brewing company Heineken N.V. announced that it had agreed to acquire Long Chuan from local company Taiwan Tsing Beer Corporation. As of 2023, other significant foreign players in the Taiwanese beer market included Kirin and Budweiser.

Microbrews, handcrafted beers and other limited-distribution beers represent a separate category. Leading Taiwan artisan beers include Three Giants Brewing Company (巨人啤酒) with a range of Lagers, Pale Ales, IPAs, Wheat Beer and Dark Lager, Redpoint Brewing, which produced the island's first IPA called 台PA, Formosa Bird Beer and Lychee Beer (both by North Taiwan Brewing) along with the house brews served in two locally owned restaurant chains, Jolly Brewery and Restaurant (operated by Great Reliance Food & Beverage) and Le ble d'or.
