= Ewha Womans University =

Private university in Seoul, South Korea

- Other name: Idae (이대·梨大)
- Motto: 진·선·미 (眞·善·美)
- Motto in English: Truth·Goodness·Beauty
- Type: Private research higher education institution
- Established: 1886; 140 years ago
- Founder: Mary F. Scranton
- President: Lee Hyang-sook (이향숙)
- Faculty: 980
- Administrative staff: 55
- Students: 20,330
- Undergraduates: 14,812
- Postgraduates: 5,518
- Location: Seodaemun, Seoul, South Korea; 37°33′45″N 126°56′42″E
- Campus: Urban, 54.5 ha (135 acres)
- Colors: Ewha green
- Website: www.ewha.ac.kr

Korean name
- Hangul: 이화여자대학교
- Hanja: 梨花女子大學校
- RR: Ihwa yeoja daehakgyo
- MR: Ihwa yŏja taehakkyo

Ewha Womans University (Korean: 이화여자대학교) is a private women's research university in Seoul, South Korea. It was originally founded as Ewha Haktang on May 31, 1886, by missionary Mary F. Scranton. Ewha Womans University has produced numerous South Korean women leaders, including politicians, CEOs, and legal professionals.

== History ==
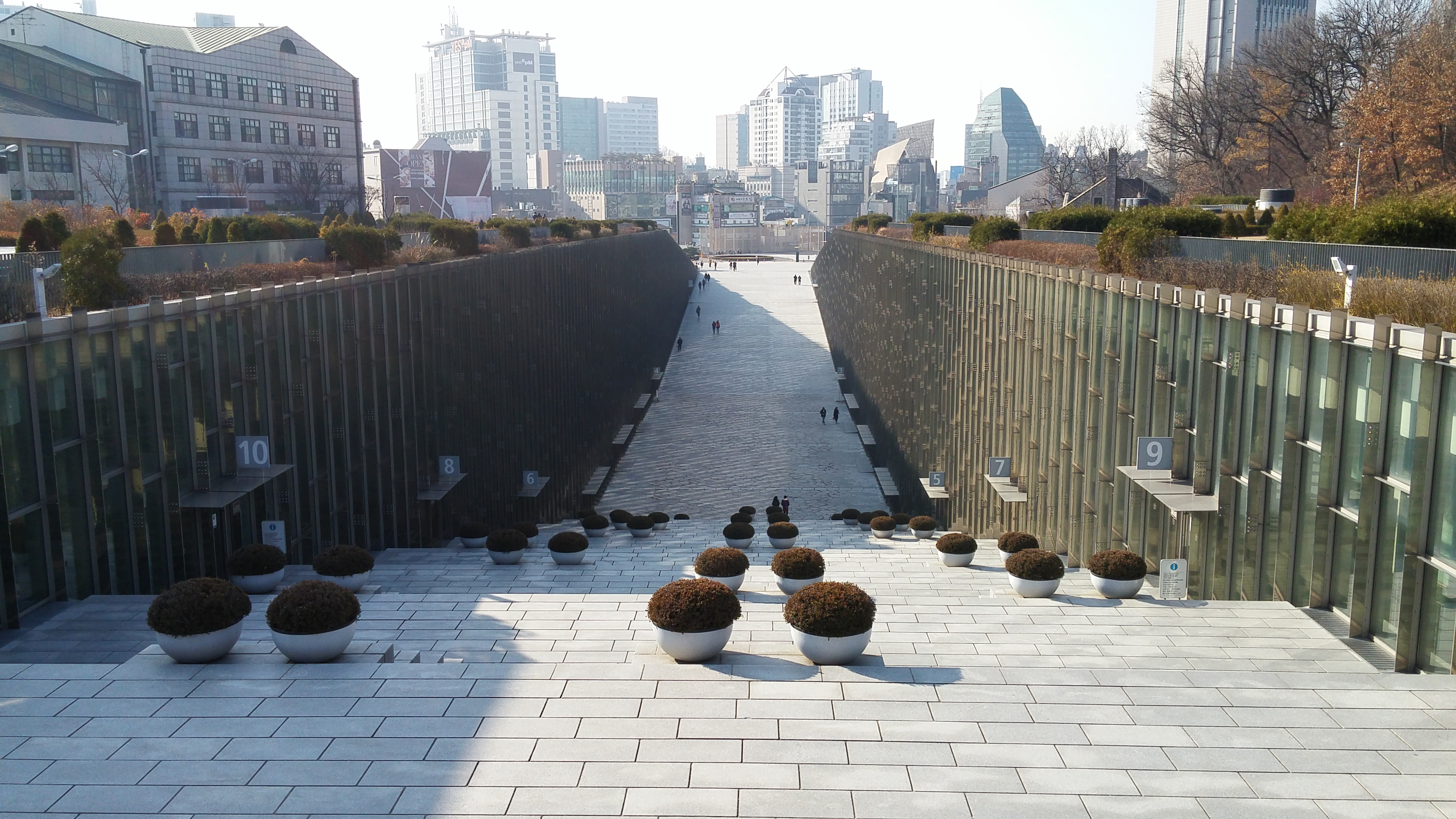
Ewha campus complex

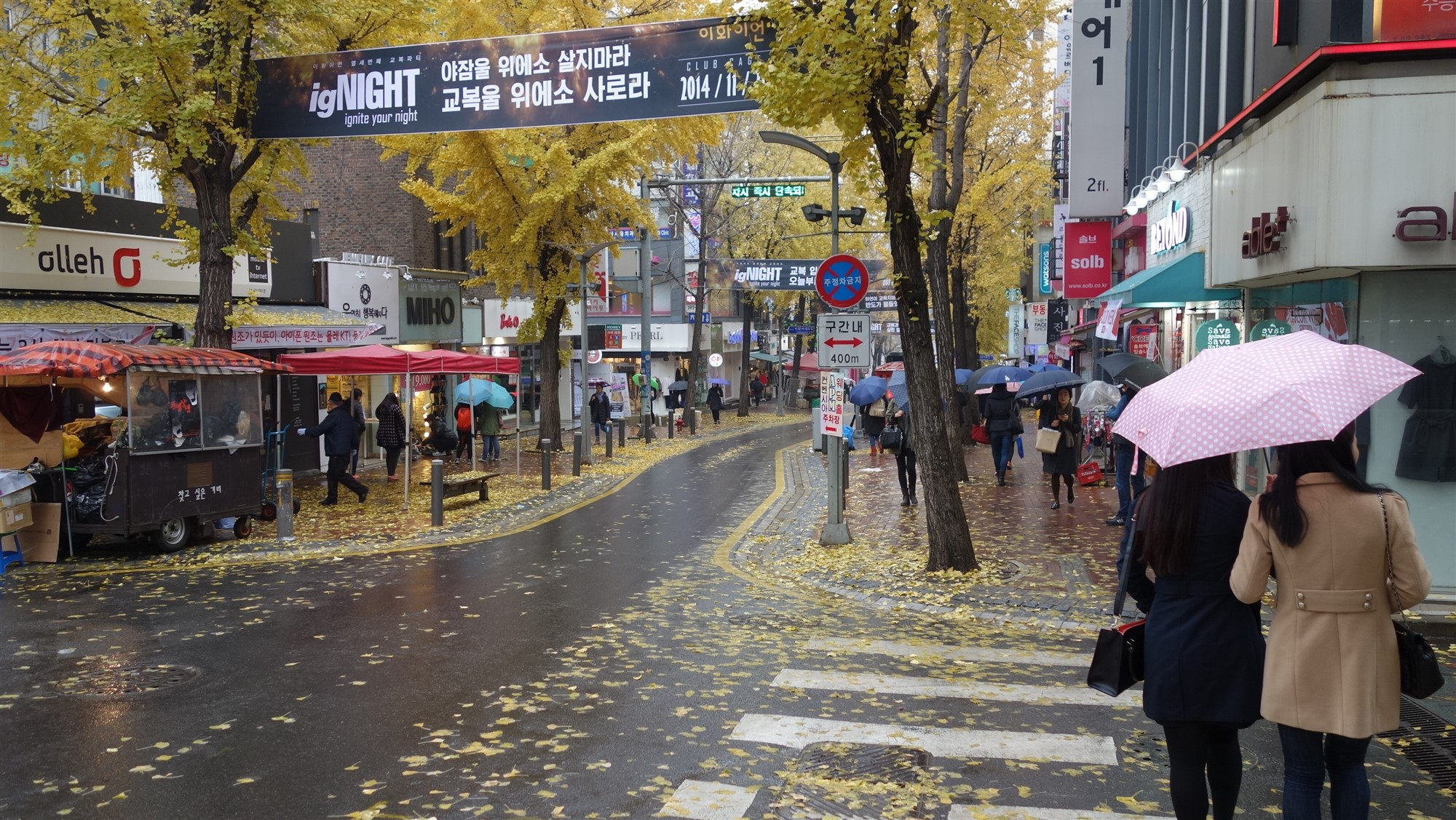
Street near Ewha

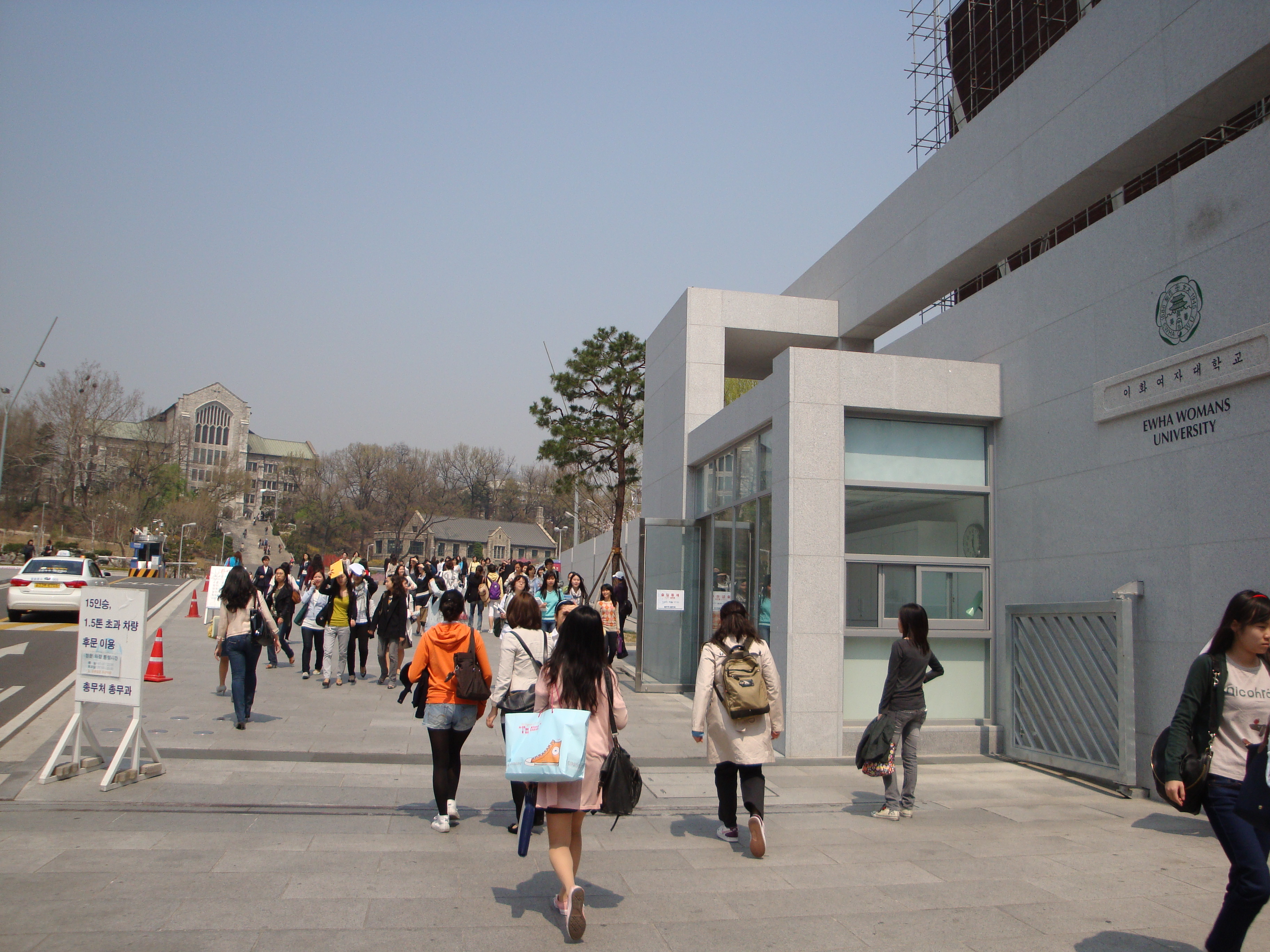
Main entrance

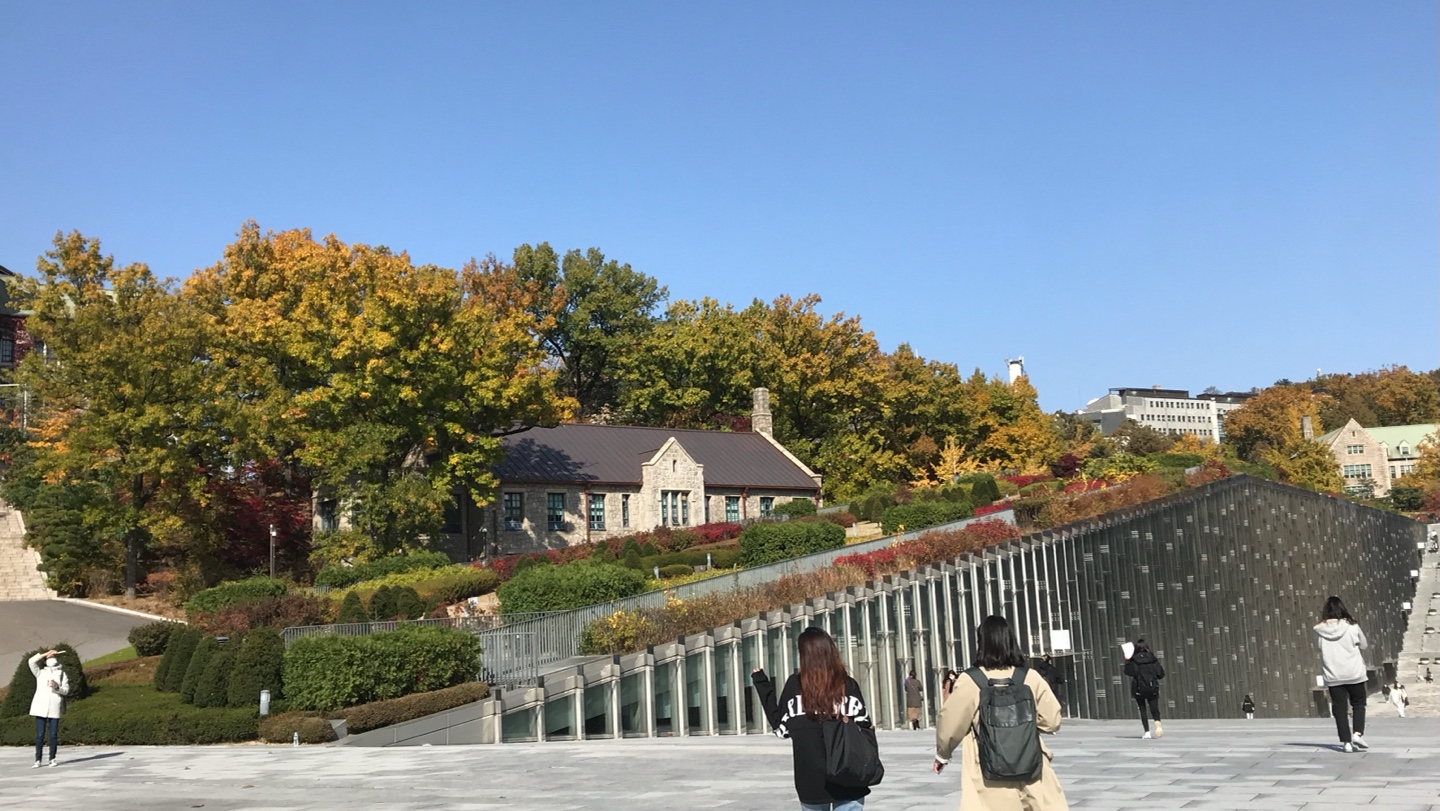
Autumn at Ewha Womans University.

Ewha Womans University traces its roots back to Mary F. Scranton's Ewha Haktang (이화학당; 梨花學堂) mission school for girls, which opened with one student on May 31, 1886. The name Ewha, which means "Pear Blossom", was bestowed by the Emperor Gojong the following year. The image of the pear blossom is incorporated in the school's logo.

The school began providing college courses in 1910, and professional courses for women in 1925. The high school section, now known as Ewha Girls' High School (not to be confused with the coeducational Ewha Womans University High School, the university's demonstration school, founded in 1958), separated from the college section and is currently located in Jung-gu, Seoul. Both institutions share the same motto and the "pear blossoms" image in their logos.

Immediately following the liberation of Korea on August 15, 1945, the college received government permission to become a university. It was the first South Korean university to be officially organized.

=== List of principals and presidents ===
As the university branched out from the high school, the first six leaders were principals and those following are presidents.

== Student population ==
According to figures provided by the university in April 2018, there are 21,596 enrolled students at the university.

While figures on the student body's gender breakdown are not available, Korea JoongAng Daily reported in 2003 there were 10 male students enrolled at the time. In 2009, Asian Correspondent reported that male students make up 30% of all foreign international students at the university.

== Collaborations ==
The university collaborates with around 830 partners in 64 countries including Australian National University, Cornell University, Free University of Berlin, Ghent University, Harvard University, Indiana University, King's College London, Mount Allison University, Nanyang Technological University, Ohio State University, Peking University, University of Kuala Lumpur, University of California, Santa Cruz, University of British Columbia, University of Edinburgh, University of Hong Kong, University of South Carolina, Uppsala University, Waseda University, and direct exchange programs with Mills College in Oakland, California and LeTourneau University in Longview, Texas.

== Name ==
The university explains its unusual name by saying that while the lack of an apostrophe in "Womans University" is unconventional, the use of "Woman" rather than "Women" was normal in the past. (Note: Compare Texas Woman's University, named in 1957, Randolph-Macon Woman's College, named in 1893, as well as Mississippi Woman's College and Woman's College of the University of North Carolina, all of which have since changed their names.) Furthermore, Woman (singular) is used in their English name, to emphasize each woman is an individual and each unique student contributes to the whole that comprises Ewha. Ewha prioritizes individual growth, avoiding unitary education.

== Museum ==
Ewha Womans University Museum opened in April 1935. It has a wide range of artifacts, ranging from paintings, ceramics, crafts, doubles, and folk items, and its main collection is the Korean National Treasure No. 107 white porcelain, iron, and grape jars. The museum consists of a permanent exhibition hall, a planning exhibition hall, a donation exhibition hall, and a Damin Goksik art museum.

University rankings
JoongAng National	Domestic	7
QS National	General	14
THE National	General	18–21
ARWU National	Research	14–18
QS Asia (Asia version)	General	70
THE Asia (Asia version)	General	=112
USNWR Asia	General	282
ARWU World	Research	601–700
QS World	General	=504
THE World	General	601–800
USNWR World	General	=877

== Controversies and criticisms ==
=== Helen Kim ===
Helen Kim, the seventh principal and first Korean principal of Ewha, is considered to be pro-Japanese. She is known to have encouraged young men to enlist in the Japanese army. The statue of Helen Kim and the building named after her on campus have both been criticized. Many protests were organized to take down the statue.

=== Women's rights movements ===
While Ewha Womans University has been the center of women's rights movements, this feminist feature created controversies in Korea. One example was men's benefit from military service. Originally, getting extra points on employment and being paid for higher step in the salary class were available to males who had done their mandatory military service. In 1999, a couple of Ewha Womans University students and one male student, who was a disabled student at Yonsei University, claimed that this law was both sexist and discriminatory toward disabled people. This case eventually went to court, and the court ruled in the students' favor.

=== 2016 South Korean political scandal ===
Ewha Womans University became embroiled in the 2016 South Korean political scandal, because a former student, Chung Yoo-ra, had been admitted under a special rule change by virtue of her mother's close connections to South Korean President Park Geun-hye despite not meeting requirements. Students had already been protesting against some of the university's unilateral changes to the degree system and departments before the political scandal blew up.As a result, the university's president, Choi Kyunghee, was ousted and convicted and Chung Yoo-ra's degree was rescinded.

== Awards ==
- 321st in the 2013 Leiden Ranking, a qualitative assessment of faculty research in the world's top 500 universities.
- 299th in the QS World University Rankings in 2018.
- Ninth among all Korean universities in the Chosun-QS Evaluation of Asian Universities in 2016.

== Distinguished honorary Ewha fellows ==
- Hillary Clinton – former United States secretary of state.
- Drew Gilpin Faust – president of Harvard University.
- Tarja Halonen – The 11th president of Finland.

== Distinguished honorary Ewha doctorates ==
- Ban Ki-moon – former secretary-general of the United Nations.
- Angela Merkel – former chancellor of Germany.
- Kersti Kaljulaid – President of Estonia.
- Michelle Bachelet – former president of Chile.
- Ertharin Cousin – former executive director of the United Nations World Food Programme.

== Distinguished fellows of the Ewha Academy for Advanced Studies ==
- Muhammad Yunus – president of Grameen Bank and the 2006 Nobel Peace Prize recipient.
- George Smoot – recipient of Nobel Prize in Physics in 2006.
- Robert H. Grubbs – American chemist and a Nobel laureate.
- Jane Goodall – British anthropologist.
- Jocelyn Bell Burnell – professor of astrophysics at Oxford University.

== Notable alumni ==
=== Politics and government ===
- Choi Young-ae – first female chair of National Human Rights Commission of Korea.
- Chun Hui-kyung – current member of the National Assembly.
- Han Myeong-sook – former and first female Prime Minister of South Korea.
- Jeon Yeo-ok – South Korean politician.
- Kim Soo-im - Diplomat and interpreter, executed for espionage under suspicious circumstances
- Kim Yoon-ok – former first lady, the wife of South Korean president Lee Myung-bak.
- Lee Mi-kyung (politician) – first female president of Korea International Cooperation Agency.
- Lee Tai-young – first Korean female lawyer and first female judge.
- Son Myung-soon – former first lady, the wife of South Korean president Kim Young-sam.
- Yoo Eun-hae – first female deputy prime minister of South Korea.
- Chang Sang – South Korean politician, acting Prime Minister 2002.

=== Business ===
- Lee Yoon-hyung – Samsung Group chief Lee Kun-hee's daughter.
- Liah Yoo – entrepreneur and YouTuber, founder of skincare company KraveBeauty.
- Kim Jung-soo (businesswoman) - vice-chair of Samyang Foods and creator of Buldak Ramen.

=== Science ===
- Insoo Kim Berg – Korean-born American psychotherapist.
- Kyung J. Kwon-Chung – NIH scientist who is chief, molecular microbiology section, at the National Institute of Allergy and Infectious Diseases
- Esther Park – first Korean female doctor.
- So-Jung Park – Chemistry professor.

=== Sports ===
- Hong Eun-ah – FIFA referee.
- Kim Hae-jin – South Korean figure skater.
- Kwak Min-jeong – South Korean figure skater.

=== Entertainment ===
- Claudia Kim – actress
- Goo Jae-yee – actress
- Yoo-Yeon Kim – TripleS member.
- Kim Hye-ja – actress
- Kim Seo-yeon – Miss Korea 2014
- Kim Yeo-jin – actress
- Kwak Hyun-hwa – actress
- Lee Yu-bi – actress
- Park Hae-mi – musical actress
- Seo Min-jung – actress
- Yang Jin-sung – actress(dropped out)
- Lilka – YouTuber and live streamer
- Roh Yoon-seo – actress and model
- Ha Young – actress and model

=== Others ===
- Chung Hyun Kyung – theologian, professor at Union Theological Seminary of Columbia University
- Sanghee Song – artist
- Helen Kim – first female Korean Doctor of Philosophy, became Dean in 1931
- JaHyun Kim Haboush – scholar of history, literature, gender studies, and King Sejong Professor of Korean Studies at Columbia University
- Lee Ae-ran – first female North Korean defector to earn a doctorate, which she earned from Ewha Womans University in the subject of food and nutrition in 2009.
- Kim Jihee – artist
- Sui Park – artist

== Affiliated facilities ==
- Ewha Womans University Museum
- Ewha Womans University Natural History Museum
- Ewha Womans University Medical Center
- Ewha Institute For Leadership Development
- Ewha Advanced IT Education Center
- Ewha School Of Continuing Education
- Ewha Language Center
- Ewha Archives
- Ewha Elementary School
- Ewha Kindergarten
- Ewha Kumnan High School
- Ewha Kumnan Middle School
- Youngran Information Industry High School
- Youngran Girl's Middle School

== Public transportation ==
- Ewha Womans University station
- Sinchon station (Gyeongui Line)

== See also ==
- Education in South Korea
- List of colleges and universities in South Korea
- Idae area
- Center for Quantum Nanoscience
- Texas Woman's University
