= Buldak =

Korean barbecued chicken dish

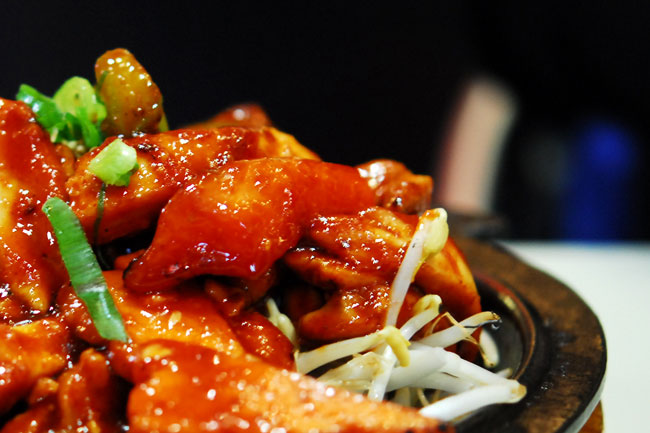
- Alternative names: Fire chicken
- Place of origin: South Korea
- Associated cuisine: South Korean cuisine
- Invented: 2001
- Serving temperature: Hot
- Main ingredients: Chicken

Korean name
- Hangul: 불닭
- RR: buldak
- MR: puldak
- IPA: pul.dak̚

Buldak (Korean: 불닭; lit. 'fire chicken') is a South Korean spicy barbecued chicken dish.

== History ==
Buldak became popular in South Korea during 2006, primarily for its extreme pungency. Several sources theorize the economic downturn at the time caused people to seek out spicy food as a stress reliever. The rise in popularity of buldak set the trend for extremely hot dishes in South Korea, which led to the rise of buldak franchise restaurants. However, the name buldak was registered at a patent office in April 2001 by Buwon Food, who claimed trademark rights to the name. This led to strong opposition from Hongcho Buldak and other leading buldak restaurants, who claimed that the term had been used as a common noun. On 30 April 2008, the Patent Court of Korea agreed that term was generalized and buldak became free for public use. Although the popularity of buldak has declined in recent years in South Korea, the dish has led to the development of other successful dishes inspired by it, such as buldak-flavored instant noodles by Samyang Food.

== Preparation and serving ==
Buldak refers to the concept of Korean spicy chicken, not a specific food or dish. It usually can be grilled or deep-fried using bite-sized chicken pieces, and is served with a spicy sauce usually including gochugaru (chili powder), gochujang (chili paste), soy sauce, jocheong (starch syrup), garlic, and ginger. Chili powder made from Cheongyang chili pepper is preferred as it is spicier than regular chili powder used in Korean recipes. Sliced garae-tteok (rice cakes) and melted cheese are common additions to the dish. Mild side dishes such as gyeran-jjim (steamed eggs) or boiled nurungji (scorched rice) are often served with buldak to help counteract the spiciness. The dish is usually accompanied with an alcoholic beverage such as beer.

== See also ==
- Jjimdak
- Padak
- Tongdak
- Korean fried chicken
- Buldak Ramen
- List of chicken dishes
