= Samyang Ramen =

South Korean instant noodle brand

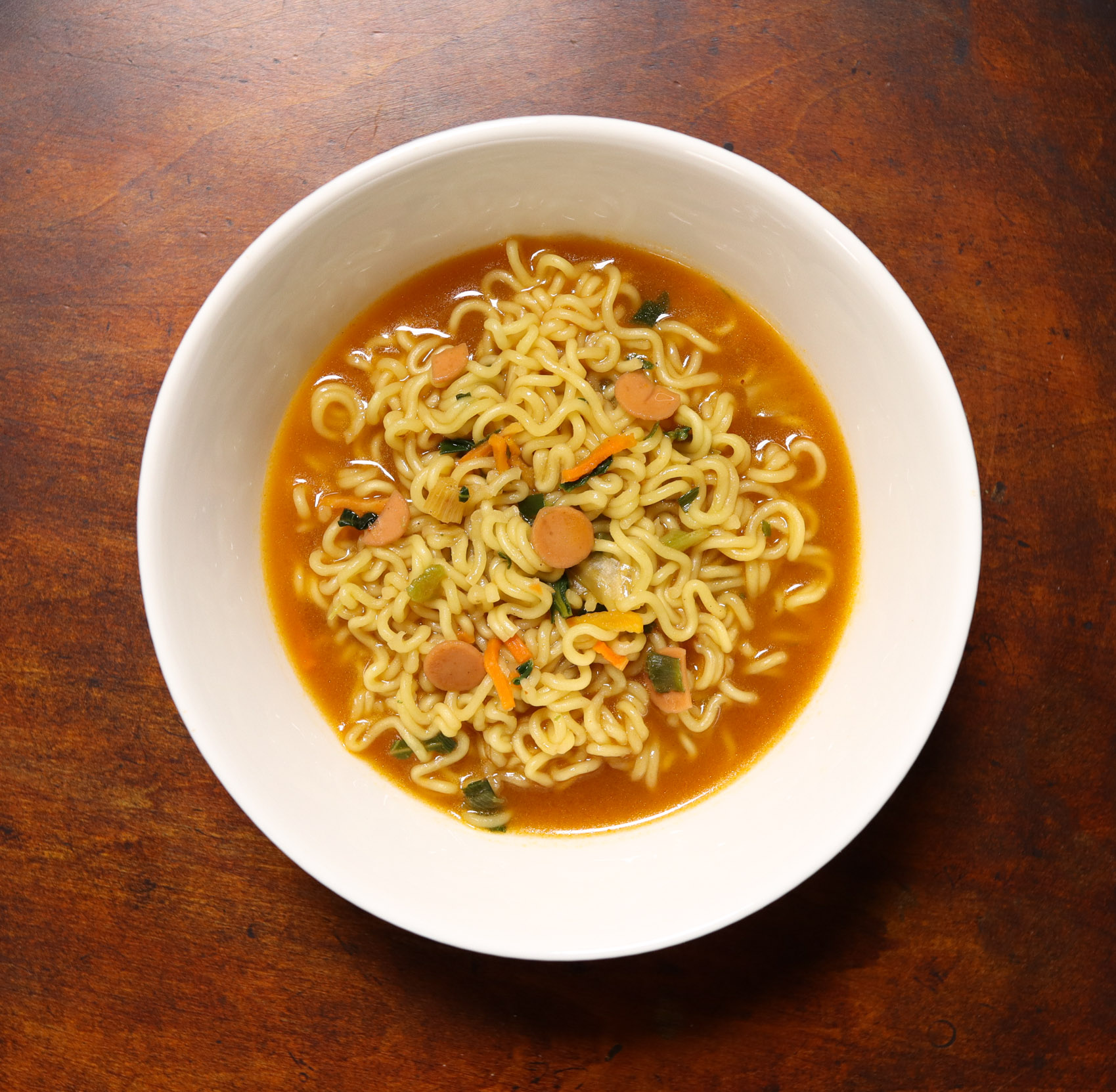
- Type: Noodle
- Place of origin: South Korea
- Created by: Samyang Foods
- Main ingredients: Instant noodle, seasoning

Samyang Ramen (Korean: 삼양라면) is an instant noodle brand made by the South Korean company Samyang Foods. It was the first instant ramen brand to be sold in South Korea.

== History ==
It was launched as South Korea's first ramen product on 15 September 1963. The creator of the dish was the chairman of the company at the time, Jeong Jung-yun (전중윤).

=== Industrial oil scandal ===
On 3 November 1989, an anonymous letter was sent to the South Korean authorities alleging that Samyang ramen was made with industrial oil. This led to five food representatives, including one from Samyang Foods, being arrested under the Act on Special Measures for the Control of Health Offenses, and Food Sanitation Act.

On 6 November 1989, the Ministry of Health, Social Affairs, and Health ruled that ramen was safe for human consumption, and all detained representatives were released. However, the company's public reputation was left greatly damaged.

In November 2025, Samyang resumed production of Samyang Ramen as Samyang 1963, after the company had experienced unprecedented growth due to the popularity of Buldak Ramen.

== See also ==
- Samyang Foods
- Samyang's Hot Chicken Flavor Ramen
