= Chris Lee (priest) =

The Reverend Chris Lee
- Occupation: priest
- Known for: online sermons

Ecclesiastical career
- Religion: Christianity
- Church: Church of England
- Website: https://saintsaviours.net/rev-chris-lee

Chris Lee is an Anglican priest-in-charge at St. Saviour's Church in Wendell Park, West London.

== Personal life ==
Lee described himself as being lost on a "middle-class conveyor belt" on what to do with his life. Lee later moved to Tanzania to teach English at a mission using the Bible as his main teaching tool, where he states he found his calling to become a priest. He then completed a distance-learning degree to become a Church of England priest and was ordained a deacon in the diocese of Mount Kilimanjaro at the age of 24. Holly Willoughby on This Morning described Chris as "the nation's favourite vicar".

He moved to St Saviour's in 2015. He is married.

== Online fame ==
Lee first appeared on the YouTube channel Korean Englishman, where he ate fire noodles and chimaek (Korean fried chicken and beer).

His response to the College Scholastic Ability Test, where he prayed for the students, made him famous online; he was seen as an open-minded and non-judgemental Christian voice on the channel. This led to the "British Priest Reacts" series on Korean Englishman's second channel, Jolly, on which he regularly featured. In 2018, he visited South Korea with his wife, Jenny, on a series hosted by Korean Englishman. In 2019, he and his twin brother Charles, a commando in the British Army, went to South Korea in the "Twins" series on Korean Englishman.

Following his online popularity, he decided to start posting images of his home life, as well as 60-second sermons and theological commentary on his Instagram. In 2020, he compiled some of these sermons into a book, The OMG Effect: 60-Second Sermons to Live a Fuller Life.

He has called for the church to do more to reach younger people through social media.
