= Jun Hee-kyung =

South Korean politician

- 전희경

Member of the National Assembly
- Incumbent
- Assumed office 30 May 2016
- Constituency: Proportional

Personal details
- Born: 9 October 1975 (age 51) Seongbuk District, Seoul, South Korea
- Party: Liberty Korea Party
- Other political affiliations: Saenuri Party (2016–2017)
- Education: Ewha Womans University
- Occupation: Politician

Jun Hee-kyung (Korean: 전희경, born 9 October 1975) is a South Korean conservative politician who is a member of the National Assembly from right-wing Liberty Korea Party (LKP) since 2016. Before joining the politics, she was the secretary-general of Centre for Free Economics.

== Biography ==
Jun was born in Seongbuk District, Seoul but grown up and educated in Uijeongbu after her father's business failure. According to her, she was an introvert and liked to think about something during this time. She earned a Bachelor's Degree in Public Administration from Ewha Womans University.

She served as the policy director of Citizens United for Better Society from 2006 to 2012, policy team leader of Korea Economic Research Institute from 2012 to 2014, and the secretary-general of Centre for Free Economics (then Centre for Free Enterprise) from 2014 to 2016. She also represented Saenuri Party (then Liberty Korea Party) during the history textbook controversies in 2015.

Prior to 2016 election, Jun was brought into the Saenuri Party. She ran 9th in the Saenuri list and elected for the National Assembly. During the presidential election in 2017, she was appointed as the spokesperson of the LKP's presidential candidate, Hong Jun-pyo.

She is socially conservative, who opposes same-sex marriage and advocates harsher immigration policy.

== Controversies ==
In 2016, she faced a criticism regarding with her thesis plagiarism in Ewha University. It was reported that about 79% of her thesis was plagiarised from the others. On 23 March 2017, she gave her degree up.

Jun received another protests after her controversial remarks towards Im Jong-seok.

== Election results ==
Year	Elections	Constituency	Political party	Votes (%)	Results
2016	16th National Assembly General Election	Proportional representation (9th)	Saenuri	7,960,272 (33.50%)	Elected
2020	21st National Assembly General Election	Dong–Michuhol A (Incheon)	UFP	54,883 (42.17%)	Defeated
2024	22nd National Assembly General Election	Uijeongbu A (Gyeonggi)	PPP	47,221 (43.44%)	Defeated
