= Korean Englishman =

YouTube channel

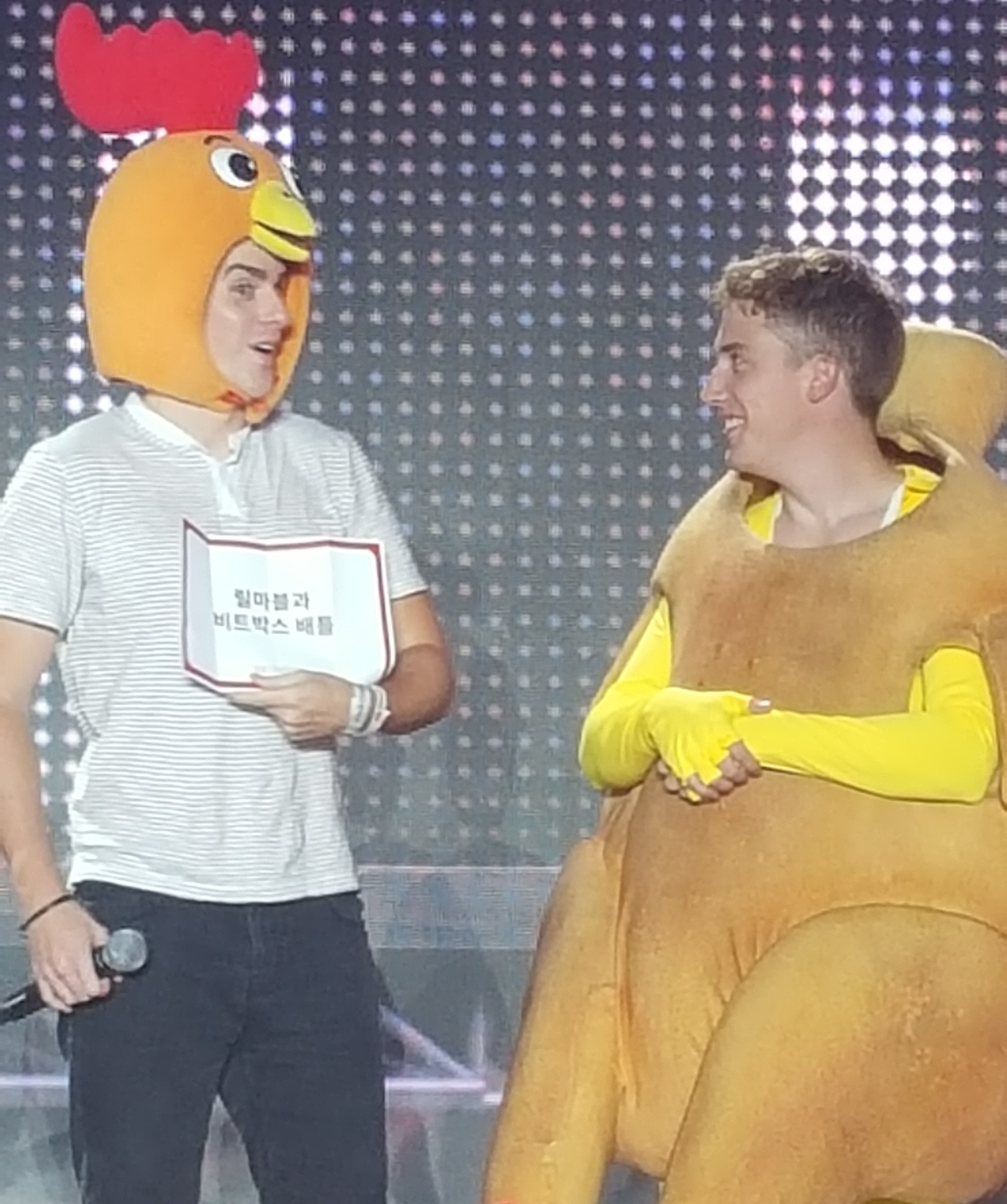
- Josh Carrott (left) and Ollie Kendal (right) at Youtube FanFest Korea, 2015
- Born: Joshua Daryl Carrott; Oliver John Kendal; 14 May 1989 (age 37); 16 November 1987 (age 39); Brighton, England

YouTube information
- Channels: 영국남자 Korean Englishman; Jolly
- Years active: 2013–present (Korean Englishman); 2017–present (Jolly)
- Genres: Korean culture; Expatriates in Korea; Mukbang
- Subscribers: 6.17 million (Korean Englishman); 5.2 million (Jolly)
- Views: 2.59 billion (Korean Englishman); 2.6 billion (Jolly)
- Last updated: 30 January 2026

Korean Englishman (Korean: 영국남자; RR: Yeonggungnamja; lit. '"Englishman"') is a YouTube channel created by internet personality duo Josh Carrott and Ollie Kendal. It features videos in Korean and English centering around South Korean culture and food.

== Cast ==
=== Joshua Carrott ===
Joshua 'Josh' Daryl Carrott was born on 14 May 1989 in Brighton, England, to Daryl and Maureen Carrott. His father was a firefighter, and his mother was a police officer. His paternal grandmother was ethnically Chinese. Aged 12, his family moved from England to Qingdao, China. Carrott was first exposed to Korean culture through South Korean expatriate students at the International School of Qingdao. He then returned to England for university, majoring in Korean language studies at SOAS, University of London. He also studied a year abroad at Korea University. He is married to Gabriela Kook, an Argentine-born South Korean chef. They welcomed daughter Julie in August 2024.

=== Oliver Kendal ===
Oliver 'Ollie' Kendal was born in November 16, 1987. His father Henry was the vicar of St Barnabas Church, North Finchley. He and Carrott met while attending SOAS in London. He has a background in video production, as well as photography and graphic design. In 2013, he was pursuing a master's degree in biblical studies. In November of that year, he and Carrott incorporated the private limited company Kendal & Carrott in the United Kingdom. Ollie is married to Lizzie Kendal and had a daughter in 2017 named Juno. On 24 June 2022, Ollie won Best Friends Cooking Battle (ft. Celebrity Chef), with Josh finishing in second place.

== Channels ==
=== Korean Englishman ===
The channel initially featured the reactions of their English friends to Korean cuisine. Most famously, they introduced fire noodles to their English friends as a spicy food challenge in 2014; this later developed into the "Fire Noodle Challenge".

They have since collaborated with both Western and Korean celebrities and organizations, including:

- A collaboration with Tottenham Hotspur featuring Son Heung-min introducing Eric Dier, Pierre-Emile Højbjerg and Hugo Lloris to Korean barbecue.
- A collaboration with Wolverhampton Wanderers featuring Hwang Hee-chan introducing Matheus Cunha, José Sá, Max Kilman, Matt Doherty and Mario Lemina to Korean street food.

In addition, Carrott, Kendall and Kook have been invited to Buckingham Palace twice and spoken with King Charles III on both occasions. The second occasion was a British-Korean state dinner featuring South Korean President Yoon Suk-yeol. The trio also sat at the same table as Jisoo, Jennie and Rosé of K-Pop girl group Blackpink, which led to Carrott offering to translate for Jisoo and Jisoo accepting.

=== JOLLY ===
Carrott and Kendal created the account now named "JOLLY" on 8th October 2015 and officially launched the "Jolly" channel in 2017, which produces a broader variety of content intended for a more global audience. Both Carrott and Kendal frequently have friends and family on as guests, including Kendal's brother-in-law, Chris Lee.

JOLLY is the collaboration channel of Kendal and Carrott with over 5.2 Million Subscribes (as of January 2026) JOLLY has had major collaborations with celebrities such as John Cena, Jason Momoa, Arnold Schwarzenegger, Jack Black, Idris Elba, and the cast of Stranger Things. JOLLY's most popular video is "British Highschoolers react to Bri'ish Memes" with over 30 Million Views

Jolly has accumulated over 2.5 Billion Views over the runtime of the videos being published. As of January 2026, Jolly is sitting at just under 1400 videos in total, on average being over 15 minutes for each videos.

In 2019, over half of the channel's views came from Korea.

== Other works ==
On Carrott's 32nd birthday, Kendal published Carrott's (partially fictitious) autobiography, which was ghostwritten by his friends, with parts of the proceeds donated to Carrot Land Adventure Park in Ohakune, New Zealand.

== Controversy ==
In October 2020, Carrott and Kook were criticised and later investigated by police after a video was uploaded on Gabie Kook's channel of Carrott and Kook receiving packages to their quarantine apartment in a way some thought were violating South Korea's COVID-19 quarantine regulations. In April 2021, all the charges were dropped.
