= Sui Park =

Sui Park, born in Seoul Korea, is a contemporary sculptor, who lives and works in New York City, NY.

== Early life and education ==
Sui Park received a BFA and an MFA in Fiber Arts from Ewha Womans University, Seoul, Korea. She holds a BFA (Magna Cum Laude) in Environmental Design from the Maryland Institute College of Art, Baltimore, MD, and an MDes in Interior Architecture from the Rhode Island School of Design, Providence, RI.

Her work as an interior designer and her training in architecture have been major influences in her approach to art.

== Career ==
=== Themes ===
Her organic sculptures, inspired directly from nature, are made from weaving zip-ties (cable-ties) together. Sui Park's use of inexpensive, manufactured materials plays on the idea that while humans are capable of creating objects that mimic nature, unlike organisms, those physical entities remain static, and frozen in their potential evolution. The artist describes her work as “3-dimensional organic forms mostly and biomorphic shapes. They represent transitions and transformations in nature.”

Her work is often a collection and repetition of objects, placed in clusters on gallery floors and walls, in nature among plants, or traveling through space, recalling swarms of alien creatures or schools of fish.

=== Awards and exhibitions ===
Sui Park is the recipient of the 2018 Excellent Award, from the 5th Textile Art of Today, Danubiana Meulensteen Art Museum, Slovak republic. In 2018, she also received a New Works Grant from the Queens Arts Fund, and the New York City Department of Cultural Affairs, for her site-specific installation Blue Print.

She received a Fellowship Award from the Vermont Studio Center, Johnson, VT in 2014.

Her work was exhibited at the International Fiber Art Fair, in the Seoul Arts Center, Seoul, Korea in 2019; at Sprout Island, Governors Island Art Fair, on Governors island, New York, NY in 2017; Art MIAMI CONTEXT, in Miami, FL in 2016, 2015 and 2014; and Art Southampton in 2016 with Denise Bibro Fine Art Gallery.

Sui Park's bibliography includes Artist Sui Park Weaves Innovation & Tradition With Future Tech by Alejandro Pardo for Artiholics (July 31, 2014); Sui Park in Conversation with Jacob Hicks, for Quantum Art Review (January 22, 2017); and Ties That Bind Weaves Craft, Metaphor Into Timeless Form, by Kirby Davis for The Chautauquan Daily (June 23, 2018). Her work has been mentioned in the Huffington Post, and Hyperallergic.

Solo exhibitions

- 2016 Playing with Perception, Denise Bibro Fine Art Gallery, New York, NY
- 2016 Garden of Humans, Kingsborough Community College, City University of New York, Brooklyn, NY
- 2010 Journey, Gateway Gallery II, Maryland Institute College of Art, Baltimore, MD
- 2004 Climbing a Mountain, Gallery Artside, Seoul, Korea

Public installations

- 2018 Floating Imagery, Pelham Art Center, Pelham, NY
- 2016 Sprout, The Flux Art Fair, Marcus Garvey Park, New York, NY
- 2014 Thought Bubbles, Governors Island Art Fair, New York, NY

Collections

- 2016 SuiTable. Jordan Schnitzer Museum of Art
- Saks Fifth Avenue, New York, NY

== Image gallery ==
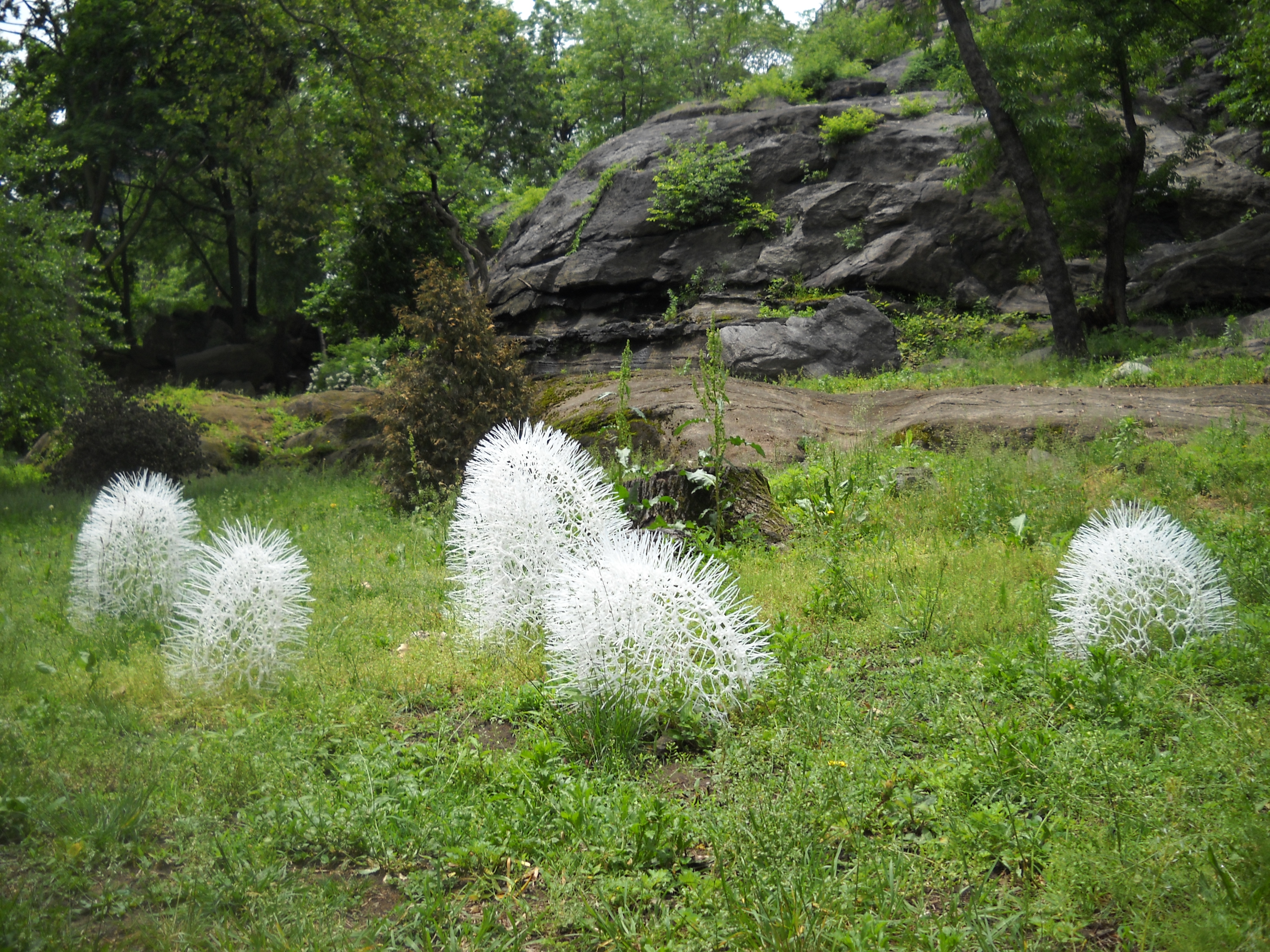
Site specific installation for The Flux Art Fair, Marcus Garvey Park, New York, NY 2016
