= Kyung J. Kwon-Chung =

South Korean-American mycologist

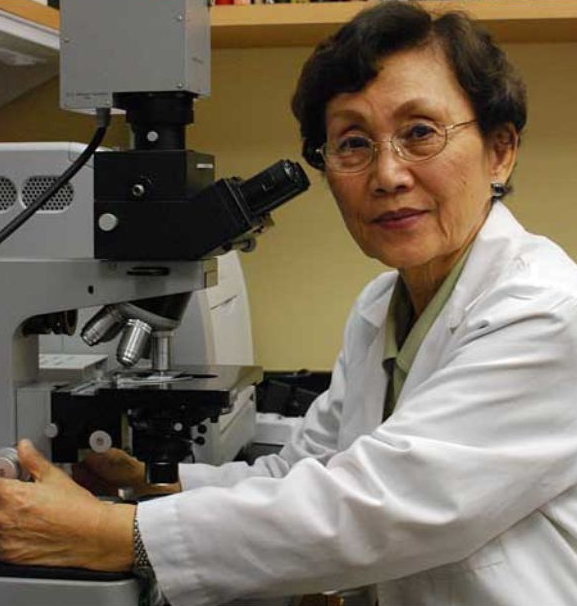
- Born: August 16, 1933 (age 93); Seoul, South Korea
- Education: Ewha Womans University; University of Wisconsin–Madison
- Scientific career
- Fields: Mycology, microbiology
- Workplaces: National Institutes of Health
- Doctoral advisor: Kenneth B. Raper

Kyung Joo Kwon-Chung (born August 16, 1933) is a South Korean-American mycologist and microbiologist who is a distinguished investigator at the National Institutes of Health. She heads the molecular microbiology section at the National Institute of Allergy and Infectious Diseases. Her research is focused on Cryptococcus neoformans and Cryptococcus gattii, which are funguses that can cause cryptococcosis, a serious disease that can lead to brain infections.

== Life ==
Kwon-Chung was born on August 16, 1933, in Seoul, South Korea. Her mother was a housewife. Her father, Choong Ton Kwon, was a congressman representing a south east district of the northern Kyunsang Province. He eventually became a defense secretary in the late 1950s to the beginning of 1960. Kwon-Chung received a B.S. and M.S. (1958) in biology from Ewha Womans University. Her graduate work involved drug resistance in E. coli. During this time, she married Chung Young Muk, the son of a defense secretary. At Ewha, she worked as a teaching assistant, research assistant, and eventually attained, a rank equivalent to an assistant professor. Kwon-Chung received a Fulbright scholarship to pursue doctoral work in the bacteriology department at the University of Wisconsin–Madison. She completed a Ph.D. in 1965 under doctoral advisor Kenneth B. Raper. She researched Aspergillus during her doctoral studies.

In 1966, Kwon-Chung joined the medical mycology section of the National Institute of Allergy and Infectious Diseases (NIAD) laboratory of microbiology as a visiting Fogarty International Fellow working under Chester Wilson Emmons. In c. 1972 , Kwong-Chung became an American citizen. She became a senior investigator in the NIAID laboratory of clinical investigation in 1973 and has been the chief of the molecular microbiology section in the laboratory of clinical immunology and microbiology since 1995. She is a National Institutes of Health (NIH) distinguished investigator. She received honorary doctoral degree in science from the University of Wisconsin in 2009 and the Lifetime Achievement Award from the American Society for Microbiology in 2017. In 2024, she was elected to the National Academy of Sciences.
