= Kim Jihee =

South Korean artist (born 1984)

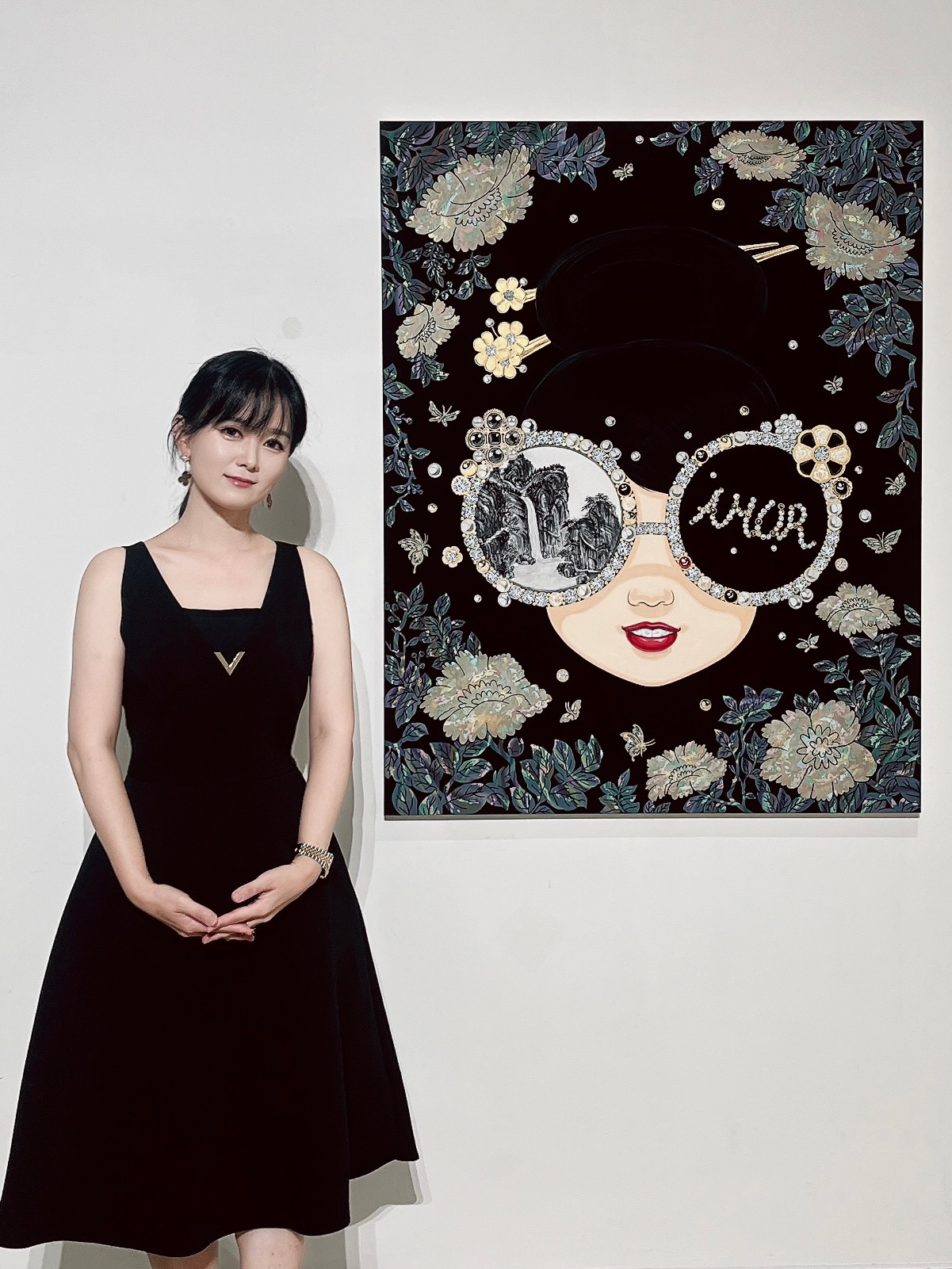
- Born: April 10, 1984 (age 42); Republic of Korea
- Education: Ewha Womans University College of Art & Design, Korean Painting (BA, MA)
- Known for: Painter
- Notable work: Sealed Smile / The Fancy Spirit / Eternal Golden
- Website: https://www.kimjihee.net/sub/index.php

Kim Jihee (Korean: 김지희; born April 10, 1984) is a South Korean artist known for her work in oriental painting. She has gained recognition for her Sealed Smile series, which often features images of smiling women, animals, and jewel-adorned glasses, conveying themes of existence and desire. Her Sealed Smile series began in 2008.

== Career ==
Kim's exhibitions have been held in major cities, including New York, Los Angeles, Hong Kong, Washington DC, Cologne, Miami, London, Tokyo, Osaka, Beijing, Singapore, Taipei, Shanghai, and Dubai.

Some of her exhibitions include a solo exhibition in 2024 at the K11 Museum in China, a large-scale exhibition led by Adrian Cheng, and a collaboration exhibition at the D·PARK in Hong Kong. Over her career, she has participated in more than 400 exhibitions both in Korea and internationally.

In 2013, Kim collaborated with the Korean girl group Girls' Generation, the footwear brand Crocs, and with the Chinese cosmetics brand Limi in 2017. She has also collaborated with Seoul in 2024. In 2025, she held an opening solo exhibition in a space including the casino in the Marriott Resort at Jeju Shinhwa World, and unveiled her first art collaboration work with Pernod Ricard's 'Royal Salute 55YO' as well as Moutai.

She has presented her third solo exhibition in Taipei, Taiwan in February 2026.

In May 2026, Kim Jihee presented a solo exhibition at Japan's Kyushu Municipal Museum, which garnered extensive coverage from top Japanese media. The exhibition highlighted her contemporary paintings and included significant public art performances and educational programs with local youth.
