= Gabie Kook =

Argentinian-born Korean YouTuber

- Born: Gabriela Kook; 1988 (age 37–38); Buenos Aires, Argentina
- Occupations: Vlogger, Chef

YouTube information
- Channel: gabiekook
- Genres: Food vlogging; Mukbang
- Subscribers: 1.38 million
- Views: 299 million
- Last updated: 2 September 2024

Gabriela "Gabie" Kook (born 1988) is a South Korean YouTuber with an international audience. Her YouTube channel covers an array of topics, but is mostly focused on food and cooking.

Kook graduated from Le Cordon Bleu, a culinary education facility in Paris. She became well-known in 2014 when she became a runner-up on a South Korean reality TV show MasterChef Korea.

In November 2021, she, Josh Carrott, and Ollie Kendal opened a specialist "Korean Toast" restaurant in London.

On 27 June 2023, Kook published her first cookbook: One Pan Recipe, initially only published in Korean as she is trying to find an English-speaking publisher.

== Personal life ==
Kook was born in Buenos Aires, Argentina, and lived in Spain until she was 12 years old. Following that, she studied in the United States and France where she interned at the renowned two Michelin-starred Parisian restaurant: Apicius. Although Kook was born abroad, her parents are South Korean nationals, and she has described herself as a "third culture kid".

Kook is the wife of Josh Carrott (known on YouTube as "Korean Englishman"). The couple married in 2016.

In 2020, Kook also said she experienced anti-East Asian racism as a result of the COVID-19 pandemic.

In 2020, Kook was diagnosed with endometriosis. In October 2023, she performed an embryo transfer procedure. On February 22, 2024, she and her husband officially announced that they are expecting a baby. In September 2024, she recalled the process after the birth of their daughter, Julie. via Caesarian section.

== Controversy ==
In May 2021, most of her videos were temporarily removed or set to private when a video, showing her allegedly flouting South Korea's COVID-19 quarantine regulations in October 2020, led to backlash (including threats of prosecution). A video apologising for the incident was uploaded on 20 April 2021.

In October 2020, Carrott and Kook came under scrutiny due to their alleged violation of South Korea's COVID-19 quarantine regulations. Kook went to Korea from London, United Kingdom for endometriosis treatment, and was required to quarantine for two weeks. However, a video was uploaded to social media of her and friends celebrating her birthday by welcoming friends at their door while they were supposed to be in isolation, and receiving birthday gifts. In one shot, Kook is shown removing her face mask to blow out candles on a birthday cake and apply lipstick, albeit in a socially distanced manner. Kook has also faced controversy over her eligibility for national health insurance in South Korea.

In her apology video, Kook confirmed that she was mistaken in believing she was paying for national health insurance in South Korea. Some netizens, however, claim she was trying to game the system and that she knew it was in fact the National Pension, not the national health insurance in South Korea, that she had paid.

Both Carrott and Kook posted public apologies after the incident, though both apologies were criticised for being inadequate.

The alleged violation has since been investigated by South Korean police who found sufficient evidence to send the case to prosecution in December 2020. Kook was accused of violating the Infectious Disease Prevention Act at the end of January; however, on April 14, the Seoul Western District Prosecutors' Office suspended the indictment against her as the prosecution decided not to file an indictment and dropped the case against Kook.
