= Kim Jung-soo (businesswoman) =

South Korean businesswoman (born 1964)

- Born: March 26, 1964 (age 62)
- Education: Ewha Womans University
- Known for: creator of Buldak Ramen

Korean name
- Hangul: 김정수
- RR: Gim Jeongsu
- MR: Kim Chŏngsu

Kim Jung-soo (Korean: 김정수; born March 26, 1964) is a South Korean businesswoman and vice-chair of Samyang Foods since 2021. Described as the "mother of Buldak", Kim has been credited as the creator of Buldak Ramen, a South Korean brand of spicy instant noodles launched by Samyang Foods in 2012.

== Career and invention of Buldak Ramen ==
A graduate of Ewha Womans University and then a homemaker, Kim joined Samyang Foods in 1998. Her father-in-law, the founder of the company, encouraged her to join the company's sales department several years after her marriage to his son, Chun In-jang. The company had declared bankruptcy that year following the 1997 Asian Financial Crisis.

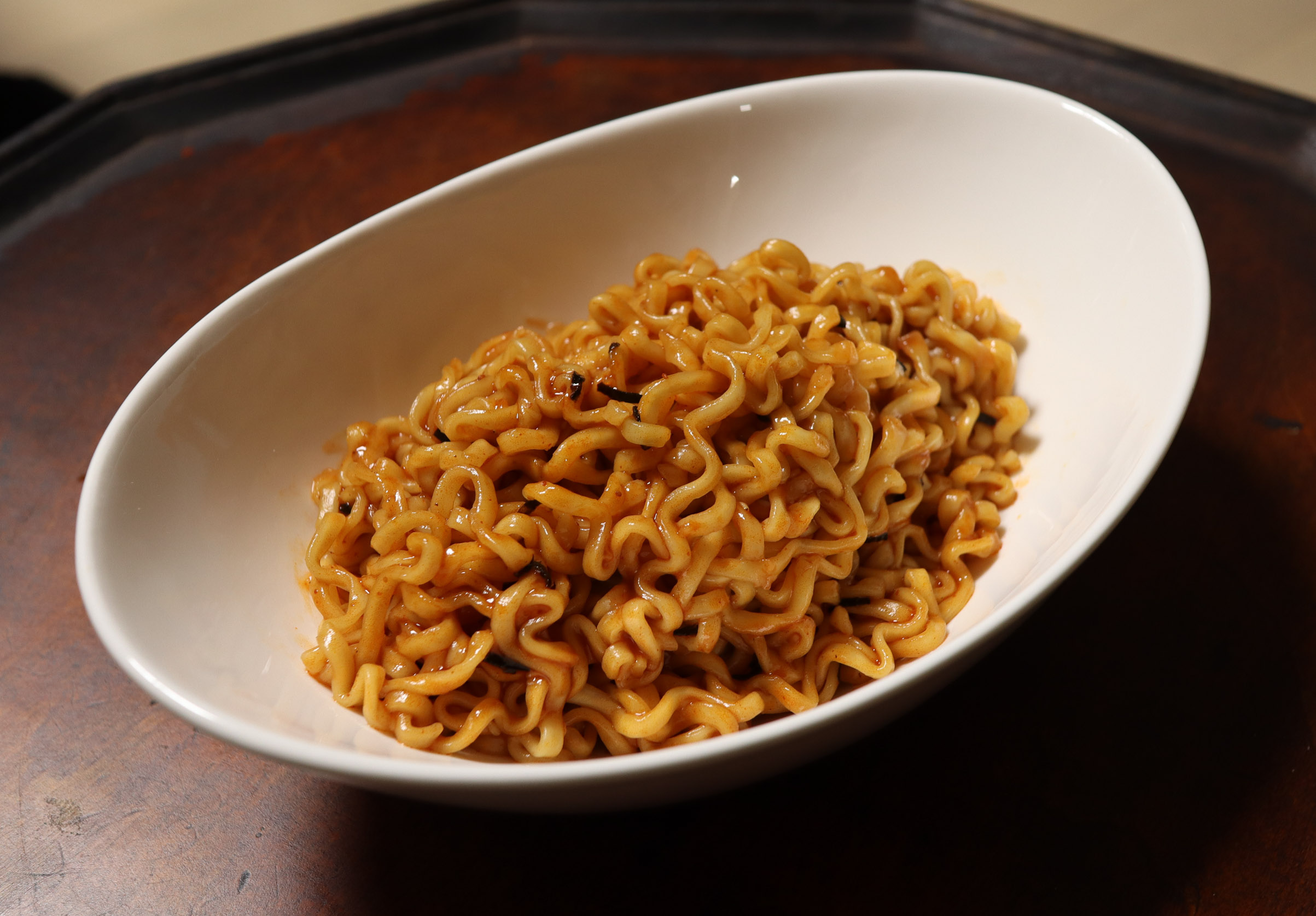
A picture of Buldak Ramen, the product which Kim is credited with launching.

In 2012, Kim launched Buldak Ramen's hot chicken flavor, inspired by her experience eating lunch at a Buldak restaurant in Myeong-dong, Seoul with her daughter in 2010. The restaurant served a spicy chicken dish and after seeing customers' reactions to its spice levels, she was inspired to turn it into a product. Though initial sales were slow, the product has since been described as a "global success", after it gained fame through a viral video challenge on YouTube in 2014 and when members of South Korean boy band, BTS, were seen eating the noodles.

In February 2026, Kim became the first female executive to receive the Korea Business Leader Award, given by the Korean Academic Society of Business Administration. Together with her husband, Chun In-jang, she has been named on Forbes' 2026 list of Korea's 50 Richest with a net worth of US$1.3 billion after record sales in 2024.

Kim will become chair of Samyang Foods in June 2026, after serving as the company's vice-chair since 2021. She was named as chair in May 2026 with the aim of expanding the company's sales overseas, according to a spokesperson for the company.
