= Liah Yoo =

South Korean entrepreneur and YouTuber (born 1989)

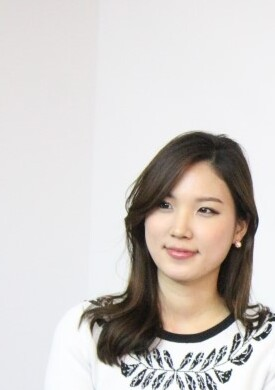
- Yoo in 2014
- Born: June 17, 1989 (age 37); Seoul, South Korea
- Education: Ewha Womans University (BA, Spatial Design)
- Occupations: Entrepreneur, YouTuber
- Known for: KraveBeauty
- Website: kravebeauty.com

Liah Yoo (born June 17, 1989) is a South Korean entrepreneur and YouTuber who founded KraveBeauty, a skincare company based in the United States. She is one of the earliest English-language creators of K-beauty content on YouTube, where her channel has accumulated more than 1.2 million subscribers. KraveBeauty, which she launched in 2017 with $50,000 in personal savings, promotes a minimalist approach to skincare and became a Certified B Corporation in 2024.

== Early life and education ==
Yoo was born on June 17, 1989, in Seoul, South Korea. She attended Ewha Womans University, where she earned a bachelor's degree in spatial design in 2013.

== Career ==
=== YouTube ===
Yoo began posting skincare content to YouTube in 2011 under the channel name "Yellowy Cream," which she later rebranded under her own name. Her videos focused on Korean beauty routines, product reviews, and skincare education presented in English, which attracted an international audience at a time when few English-language K-beauty channels existed. By 2016, Teen Vogue named her one of "15 Beauty YouTubers to Watch," and she appeared as a panelist on the Korean beauty television program Get It Beauty. As of 2026, her channel has more than 1.2 million subscribers and over 90 million cumulative views.

=== AmorePacific and consulting ===
From 2013 to 2015, Yoo worked in e-commerce strategy at AmorePacific, South Korea's largest beauty conglomerate. She also provided social media and content marketing consulting for clients including L'Oréal Asia Pacific, L'Occitane Korea, and Pinterest. During this period, her YouTube channel grew to approximately 120,000 subscribers, and she left AmorePacific in 2015 to pursue content creation full-time.

=== KraveBeauty ===
Yoo founded KraveBeauty in 2017, investing $50,000 of her own savings without outside funding. The company remains entirely bootstrapped. It launched in December 2017 with the Matcha Hemp Hydrating Cleanser as its first product. KraveBeauty promotes what Yoo describes as "slow skincare," deliberately maintaining a capsule lineup of approximately nine products and releasing roughly one new product per year. The company went two years between 2020 and 2022 without introducing any new products, yet sales grew 250 percent year-over-year in 2020. Its best-known product, Great Barrier Relief, is a serum designed to support the skin barrier.

The company is structured as a Public Benefit LLC. In 2024, KraveBeauty received B Corporation certification with a score of 81.6. The company expanded internationally in 2024, entering Sephora Southeast Asia across 39 stores in Malaysia, Thailand, and Singapore, as well as the UK retailer Cult Beauty. In January 2025, KraveBeauty launched the Plumptuous Lip Jelly, which the company described as the world's first refillable lip oil, featuring a reusable metal applicator that eliminates 76 percent of plastic in future purchases.

=== Press Reset Ventures ===
In February 2022, Yoo launched Press Reset Ventures, a $1 million venture fund financed from KraveBeauty's profits, dedicated to investing in sustainable beauty brands.

== Advocacy and sustainability ==
Yoo has been a prominent advocate for reducing overconsumption in the skincare industry. She has given a TEDx talk titled "The best way to solve the climate crisis—for brands and for consumers" at TEDxPCC.

In 2020, KraveBeauty launched its "Slow Down Skincare" initiative, committing to not launching any new products for an entire year while reassessing its portfolio. In 2022, the company launched the #PressReset campaign, encouraging consumers to simplify their skincare routines. That same year, the Waste Me Not initiative repurposed approximately $1.5 million worth of unsaleable product waste by reformulating rejected product bulk into a limited-edition body wash sold at cost. In 2023, KraveBeauty established the Anti-Consumer Consumer Grant, a $15,000 annual award for content creators focused on sustainability.

KraveBeauty has partnered with Women's Earth Alliance to establish an ethical supply chain for tamanu oil sourced from Indonesia, helping women tamanu farmers achieve a more than 50 percent increase in income. The company has donated more than $586,000 to causes supporting underrepresented communities over five years. The company holds Climate Neutral certification, is Plastic Neutral certified, and is a member of 1% for the Planet and the Climate Pledge.

== Speaking engagements ==
Yoo has spoken at TEDxPCC, YouTube Beauty Fest (twice), and the WWD Diversity Forum, where she discussed challenges and opportunities as a founder of color. In 2025, she spoke at Delivering Good's Women of Impact Summit at the Fashion Institute of Technology in New York City.

== Recognition ==
- Cosmopolitan, "10 Beauty Game Changers"
- Worth Magazine Impact 150, recognizing companies addressing the United Nations Sustainable Development Goals (2024)
- Fast Company Innovation by Design Awards, Honorable Mention in Sustainability (2023)
- Beauty Independent Beacon Awards, Entrepreneur of the Year nominee (2023)
- Very Good Light Lightning Awards, "Thought Starter Brand of 2020"
- WGSN and Byrdie, "Brand to Watch" nominee
- Teen Vogue, "15 Beauty YouTubers to Watch" (2016)
