= Gong Byeong-ho =

South Korean scholar, economist and author (born 1960)

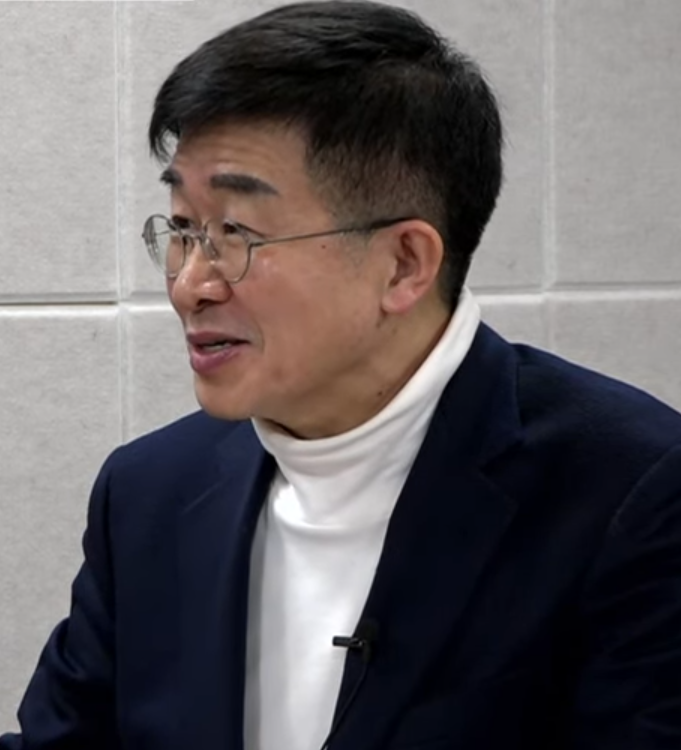
- Gong on his YouTube channel in 2020
- Born: May 10, 1960 (age 66); Chungmu, South Gyeongsang Province, South Korea
- Education: Korea University (BA, 1979); Rice University (PhD, 1987)
- Occupations: Economist, author
- Known for: Founder of Center for Free Enterprise

Korean name
- Hangul: 공병호
- Hanja: 孔柄淏
- RR: Gong Byeongho
- MR: Kong Pyŏngho

Gong Byeong-ho (Korean: 공병호, born May 10, 1960) is a South Korean economist and author. He is the founder of the Center for Free Enterprise, a libertarian think tank, and is the author of books on economics and management.

Since 2020, Gong has promoted right-wing conspiracy theories about electoral fraud by the Democratic Party of Korea, for which he has been charged with spreading misinformation by the Seoul Election Commission.

== Early life and education ==
Gong, born in Chungmu (now Tongyeong), South Gyeongsang Province, South Korea, was the youngest of seven siblings. Having first left home to attend a high school in Busan, Gong eventually earned a degree in economics from Korea University in 1979, and completed a PhD in economics at Rice University in 1987.

== Career ==
=== Center for Free Enterprise ===
Gong joined the Korea Economic Research Institute (KERI) as a researcher in 1990, where he and a fellow researcher, Kim Chung-ho, began to develop ideas on the market economy. They criticized increasing business and banking restrictions on chaebols (South Korean conglomerates like Samsung and LG) that were popular at the time, advocating for less government regulation. Critics, in turn, accused KERI of being a puppet of the chaebols, as it was funded by the Federation of Korean Industries (FKI), a lobby group representing the same companies.

Gong founded the Center for Free Enterprise in 1997, as part of KERI, to promote libertarianism and free market economic principles. It was later spun off into a separate organization with the assistance of Sohn Byung-doo, the then-president of FKI.

The center has reprinted publications on libertarianism for Korean readers, including works by Friedrich Hayek, Ludwig von Mises, and Ayn Rand, and published books on libertarian policy proposals by Korean scholars. Gong was the center's director until 1999, departing to lead Internet start-up Intizen.

=== Gong Institute ===
In 2001, Gong established the eponymous Gong Byeong-ho Research Institute, a self-run business and management consulting service. As of 2009, he had published more than 80 books and was giving almost 300 lectures a year on self-help and entrepreneurship.

=== Politics ===
Gong briefly chaired the nomination committee of the Future Korea Party (FKP), which existed from February to May 2020. As it was composed of former members of the right-wing United Future Party (UFP), the UFP was accused by other parties of exploiting a loophole in a recently passed act to maximize allocated seats in the National Assembly; it merged into the UFP following the election.

A minor scandal ensued when Gong announced the list of nominees, which placed the UFP's recommendations at the bottom, beneath FKP-chosen candidates that included a piano player and YouTuber. He apologized a few days later, and was replaced by Baekseok University professor Bae Gyu-han.

== Election fraud claims ==
Gong established a YouTube channel in 2015 called "Gong Byeong-ho TV", and has since become a popular far-right social media influencer in South Korea. Videos on his channel cover topics such as the economy and politics, and in some cases have been flagged as violations of YouTube's content policies, including one on COVID-19 and another on election fraud.

=== 2020 ===
In 2020, he claimed the vote in that year's legislative election had been manipulated after the Democratic Party of Korea won in a landslide, despite previous expectations that it would struggle. In a press release, Gong cited as evidence a report by University of Michigan professor Walter Mebane that found statistical anomalies in early voting.

The JoongAng and E-Korea said that Mebane lacked familiarity with South Korea's political culture and the National Election Commission's vote counting method, misinterpreting the data as showing nearly 100% early voter turnout in certain districts, when the true rate averaged 27%. The Korea Times also pointed out that early voting in 2020 was different from previous elections "due to COVID-19, which could have created distortions from earlier voting patterns" that Mebane had based his analysis on.

=== 2022 ===
Gong again claimed early voting fraud before the 2022 South Korean presidential election, and was accused by YTN of broadcasting false information regarding the election. The Seoul Election Commission charged him with spreading misinformation and obstructing free participation in early voting, a violation of the Public Offices Election Act.

=== 2024 ===
In the 2024 South Korean legislative election, where the conservative People Power Party suffered losses, Gong speculated the Democratic Party had inserted counterfeit ballots into the voting system, resulting in 95% of overseas ballots going to their party. Agence France-Presse investigated his calculations and found the actual number to be 70%, much lower than claimed. The National Election Commission dismissed Gong's video, saying that it "clearly goes against publicly disclosed election results".

Several news organizations theorized that President Yoon Suk Yeol had been influenced by right-wing social media posts like Gong's when he declared martial law in December 2024, as he had "repeatedly referenced [similar election fraud claims] to justify his targeting of the National Election Commission".

== Personal life ==
Gong and his wife, Seo Hye-sook, a former civil servant and restaurateur, live in Gayang-dong, Gangseo District, Seoul. They have two sons who attended schools in the United States.

== Awards and recognitions ==
- 1995: Awarded the 7th Free Economy Publication Award for the book Transfer of Power in the Korean Economy
- 1996: Awarded the 8th Free Economy Publication Award for the book What is Market Economy
- 1997: Awarded the 9th Free Economy Publication Award for the book Market Economy and Its Enemies
- 2014: Gong Byeong Ho's Life Dictionary recommended by the Ministry of Culture
- 2011: The Growth and Decline of Korean Companies recommended by the Ministry of Culture
- 2010: Korea's Growth Spurt recommended by the Ministry of Culture
- 2009: The Art of Leading recommended by the Ministry of Culture
- 2009: Selected by Maeil Business Newspaper as South Korea's 4th most influential business leader
- 2009: Awarded the Famous Lecturer Award by Korea's HRD Association
- 2008: Selected by Maeil Business Newspaper as South Korea's 8th most influential business leader
