= Center for Free Enterprise =

South Korean political think tank

- Founder: Gong Byeong Ho
- Established: 1996
- Mission: to broaden the parameters of public policy debate to increase the understanding of free markets, free markets and individual liberty.
- President: Choi Seung Ro
- Staff: 19
- Slogan: "Individual Liberty, Free Markets, and Free Enterprise."
- Address: Jeil Building 44-3, Yoido-dong, Youngdeungpo-gu, Seoul, Korea 150-890
- Location: Seoul, South Korea

The Center for Free Enterprise (Korean: 자유기업원) is a libertarian, formerly neoconservative, think-tank based in Seoul, South Korea.

Although the CFE was originally established upon the libertarian belief according to the philosophy of Friedrich Hayek and Ludwig von Mises, in later years, it expressed neoconservative, authoritarian or even McCarthyist ideas. For example, CFE enthusiastically advocated the nationalization of history textbooks in Korea, which was mainly discussed under the Park Geun-hye administration. Some libertarian scholars considered that the CFE had ruined libertarian ideas. However, after the impeachment of the Park administration, in 2017, the CFE changed its name from "자유경제원" to "자유기업원".
