= Samyang Foods =

South Korean food company

- Type: Public
- Traded as: KRX: 003230
- Industry: Food industry
- Founded: 15 September 1960; 66 years ago
- Headquarters: Seoul, South Korea
- Area served: Worldwide
- Revenue: ▲US$1.2 billion (2024)
- Operating income: ▲US$241 million (2024)
- Number of employees: 1,754

Korean name
- Hangul: 삼양라운드스퀘어
- Hanja: 三養라운드스퀘어
- RR: Samyang raundeuseukweeo
- MR: Samyang raundŭsŭk'weŏ
- Website: https://roundsquare.ai

Samyang Roundsquare Co., Ltd. (Korean: 삼양라운드스퀘어) is an international South Korean food manufacturer and the first instant ramen company in South Korea. Samyang was founded on September 15, 1961, by Jeon Jung Yoon. In 1963, Samyang debuted the first Korean instant noodle.

== History ==
In the early 1970s, Samyang Foods converted a 20 km^{2} Daegwallyeong forest into a grassland to raise livestock.

In 2010, Jeon In Jang became the company's chairman. The company is now placed third to fourth in the instant noodle market of Korea. Samyang Foods started exporting its products, increasing the company's profits. Recently, the company took over several restaurant chains to expand into the food service industry.

In 2012, Samyang Foods released its Buldak Spicy Chicken Ramen. Kim Jung-soo is credited with developing the flavour, inspired by a lunch she had at a restaurant in Seoul. The new Buldak Spicy Chicken flavor became popular in the YouTube community.

In 2012, Samyang Foods, along with several other companies in the instant noodles market, including Nongshim, Ottogi, and Korea Yakult, were fined by the Korean Fair Trade Commission for fixing instant noodles prices from 2001 to 2010.

In 2019, Hyundai Development Co., a large shareholder of Samyang Foods with a 16.99% stake, pushed for the suspension of board directors with criminal records.

In 2019, Samyang Foods established Samyang Japan, its first overseas sales unit. This expansion was motivated by Japan's large ramen market, approximately US$5.4 billion of ramen consumption.

In 2020, Samyang Foods launched its new kimchi-flavored Buldak spicy noodles to meet consumer demand and interest in "fire noodles".

On March 19, 2021, Samyang Foods Co. announced its sales reached a new high due to the increased demand for its instant noodles during the coronavirus pandemic. Samyang Foods Co.'s operating profit increased by 21.9% over the previous year.

=== Growth in the United States ===
Samyang Foods has experienced significant growth in the United States, driven by social media trends and the global popularity of Korean culture. The company's revenue doubled from 2022 to approximately US$1.5 billion in 2025, fueled in part by the viral "Fire Noodle Challenge" on platforms like TikTok and YouTube, as well as the broader influence of the Korean Wave in entertainment and cuisine. In the first half of 2025, U.S. sales reached US$185 million, accounting for 30% of Samyang Foods' overseas revenue. To meet rising demand, the company opened a fourth ramen factory in June 2025, with an annual production capacity of 100 million units.

== Legal Issues ==
In the 1980s, Samyang Food began producing other products such as snacks, dairy products, and sauces. The demand for instant noodles in Korea increased, followed by increasing exports to Japan and the United States. In 1989, allegations arose that Samyang used unsafe industrial oil in their noodles. Although ultimately cleared of any wrongdoing, this scandal harmed the company's reputation and contributed to ending its dominance in the instant noodle market.

In 2018, Samyang Foods Co. reached an agreement with its U.S. subsidiary, Samyang USA, to resolve a nearly US$1 billion legal battle. Samyang USA paid $4.1 million in reparations.

In 2019, the settlement of two class actions against Defendant Samyang Foods was approved by the Supreme Court of British Columbia and the Superior Court of Justice of Ontario. Terms of settlement include that Samyang Foods pay $288,586.98 in compensation.

On January 25, 2019, Samyang chairman Jeon In Jang was sentenced to prison for 3 years for embezzling $5 billion Won (US$4.43 million) of his company's funds. His wife and CEO of Samyang, Kim Jung-soo, was given a 2-year prison term, albeit suspended for 3 years, on the exact charges. Since Jeon's imprisonment, Kim has assumed her husband's leadership duties.

In June 2024, Denmark recalled three variants of Samyang's spicy ramen noodle products after the Danish Veterinary and Food Administration assessed the levels of capsaicin in a single packet to be high enough to pose a risk of the consumer developing acute poisoning. The recall was upheld for Buldak 3x Spicy Hot Chicken, the spiciest of the three, but was reversed for the other two variants a month later after an updated risk assessment by the Food Institute of the Technical University of Denmark revealed lower capsaicin levels in those variants.

== Chronology ==
- September 1961: Samyang Dairy Corporation was first established.
- October 1961: Changed the name to Samyang Industrial Co., Ltd
- September 1963: Produced Korea's first instant noodle
- October 1965: Changed to Samyang Food Industrial Co., Ltd
- November 1967: Moved to Dobong Plant from Wolgok Plant
- January 1969: Established Samyang Dairy Products
- November 1973: Started construction of the Daegwallyeong grassland
- January 1978: Established Samyang Oil Industry
- October 1978: Opening of the Samyang Medical Corporation
- November 1989: Industrial oil scandal
- June 1990: Changed the name to Samyang Food Industrial Co., Ltd
- July 2023: Changed the name to Samyang Roundsquare Co., Ltd.

== Products ==
- Samyang Ramen
  - Hot Chicken Flavor Ramen
  - Buldak Ramen
- Samyang bowl and cup noodles
- Samyang snacks
- Refined sugar

== Affiliates of Samyang (Samyang family) ==
- Samyang Ranch
- Ho Myeon Dang
- Ho myeon dang (Premium Noodle House)
- Gourmet Ho myeon dang (Gourmet Noodles and Comfort Food)
- Ho myeon and Ban (Oriental Noodle Shop)
- Lamen's (We Know Korean Flavor)
- Samyang Sae A-chim
- Samyang Jeju Milk

== See also ==
- List of companies of South Korea
- Kim Jung-soo (businesswoman)
