= Buldak Ramen =

South Korean brand of instant noodle

- English-language logo

- Korean-language logo
- Product type: Instant noodles
- Produced by: Samyang Foods
- Country: South Korea
- Introduced: April 2012
- Markets: Worldwide
- Website: https://buldak.com

Korean name
- Hangul: 불닭볶음면
- RR: Buldak-bokkeummyeon
- MR: Puldak-pokkŭmmyŏn
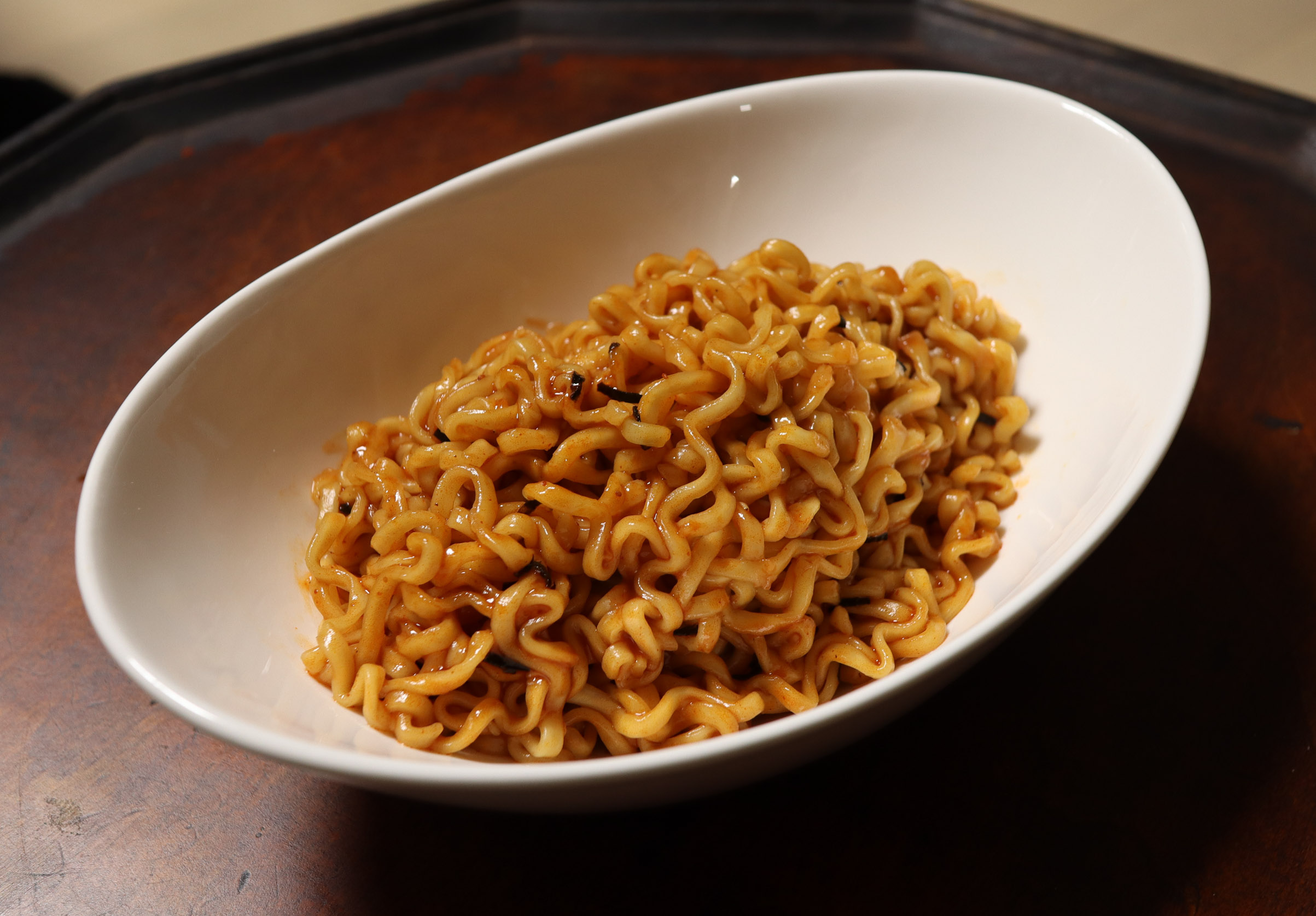
- A bowl of the classic Buldak Ramen

Buldak Ramen (Korean: 불닭볶음면; RR: Buldak-bokkeummyeon; lit. 'fire chicken stir-fried noodles') is a South Korean brand of instant noodle, produced by Samyang Foods since April 2012. Inspired by buldak, a spicy chicken dish, it is Samyang's best-selling product, with 6.6 billion sales worldwide by September 2024. It is considered one of the spiciest instant noodles available in the South Korean market, with the original packet having 4,404 Scoville units.

== History ==
Buldak Hot Chicken Flavor Ramen was first launched in April 2012. It was inspired by a spicy chicken stir-fry dish that Kim Jung-soo, a member of Samyang Foods' sales department, observed while eating lunch at a restaurant in 2010. Kim recalled that the dish had the customers "sweating and fanning their tongues, assailed by both pleasure and pain". When Samyang's food scientists created prototypes for the ramen, she repeatedly told them to make it spicier.

The popularity of the noodles worldwide surged when the "Fire Noodle Challenge" went viral on YouTube. The challenge was started by the YouTube channel "Korean Englishman" in 2014, in which the host Josh Carrott challenged his friends in the UK to see who could finish the noodles the fastest without drinking any water or beverage. The popularity of the video led to other YouTubers all around the world to do the same challenge and therefore cause a surge in the noodle's popularity.

Some flavours of noodles were recalled in Denmark in 2024, with the Danish Veterinary and Food Administration stating that a single packet's capsaicin levels are so high that consumers risked "acute poisoning". Later, Danish authorities withdrew the recall against Samyang Buldak 2x Spicy Hot Chicken and Samyang Buldak Hot Chicken Stew, but maintained the prohibition on Buldak 3x Spicy Hot Chicken.

=== Foreign imitation products ===
With its rising popularity and recognition internationally, Chinese and Japanese food companies have begun to roll out products that mimic Buldak ramen to capitalize on this trend.

In 2021, Samyang, in cooperation with the Korea Food Industry Association (KFIA), filed an intellectual property lawsuit against Chinese companies that produce and distribute its imitated products. Later, in March 2023, a Chinese court ruled that Chinese companies had infringed on intellectual property rights by imitating trademarks and designs in a lawsuit filed by four South Korean companies, including Samyang, and ordered them to pay reparations.

In April 2023, Nissin Foods, a Japanese food company, sparked controversy in South Korea by launching a Korean-style stir-fried instant ramen with spicy sauce that mimics a packaging design similar to Samyang's Carbonara Buldak ramen. Regarding the controversy, Samyang said it plans to promote products that emphasize uniqueness and originality in the Japanese market in the future.

Imitation brands of Buldak Ramen are popular across the world, being sold in China, Southeast Asia, Russia, and North Africa. A brand called Bingoone is manufactured in China and sold in markets in Hong Kong, Indonesia, Egypt, and multiple African countries. Chinese manufacturers of imitation products sometimes put misleading logos indicating that the product is from Korea and Halal-certified on packaging. In 2025, the North Korean Rason Ryongseon Joint Venture Company released an imitation ramen product called Spicy Kimchi Bibim Guksu on the Chinese market. The newspaper Korea JoongAng Daily noted that the North Korean product was "a near-perfect imitation" of Buldak Ramen.

=== Spinoffs ===
Samyang has expanded the Buldak brand beyond instant noodles into other products like Buldak Hot Sauce, Buldak Potato Chips, Buldak Fried Rice, Buldak Tteokbokki, Buldak Dumplings and others.

In April 2026, Samyang debuted with a new line of Buldak Mac and Cheese in the United States, with distribution at Walmart.

== Description ==
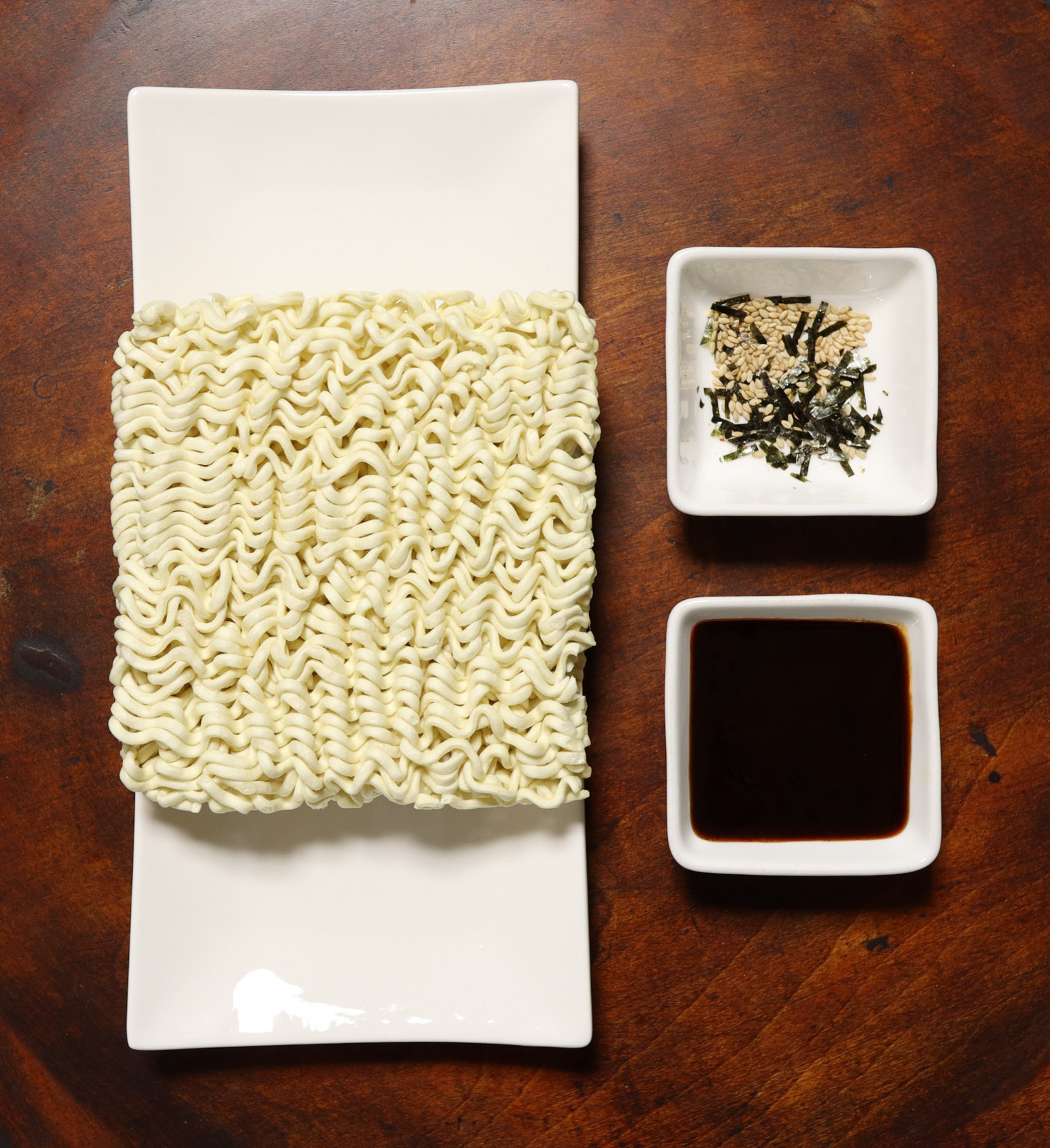
An uncooked, opened pack of Buldak Original Flavor Ramen

Buldak ramen is considered one of the spiciest brands of instant noodles available in the Korean market, with the original packet having 4,404 Scoville units. It is a type of 'stir-fried' dry noodle: after boiling, the noodles are drained, and mixed with a spicy sauce and a topping. The product became famous due to the Fire Noodle Challenge, a viral social media challenge where people film themselves eating the sauce pack or bowl of noodles.

Buldak Ramen is Samyang Foods' best-selling product. 4 billion cumulative sales were reached in August 2022, and the brand attained monthly sales of 6 to 7 billion won the following year (5.1 to 5.9 million United States dollars). From the second half of 2016, as exports of this product increased, they became the company's best-seller. In 2017, the Buldak range accounted for more than 85% of Samyang Food's total exports and 55% of total sales. In 2016, when Buldak-bokkeummyeon began to be sold in earnest, Samyang Foods' sales grew 23.5% to 359.3 billion won, followed by a double-digit growth rate in 2017 with a sales of 450 billion won (estimated value). For this reason, Samyang Foods received the '100 Million Dollar Export Tower' at the "54th Trade Day 2017" event.

The mascot of the Hot Chicken Flavor Ramen series is a chicken named "Hochi" (호치). In 5 June 2026, Samyang announced the replacement of Hochi with a new mascot, "Peppo".

== Types ==
Since the release of the original in 2012 and subsequent success, Samyang has released varieties that differ in spice and often flavour from the original to keep up with demand.

== Buldak product list (Samyang Foods) ==
Note: The country columns (US, KR, AE, etc.) indicate which regional websites provide product information, not the countries where the product is sold.

=== Active Products ===
Product Name	Category	Spiciness	Flavor	US	KR	AE	AU	MY	PH	TH	VN	Link
Buldak Ramen Swicy Big Bowl	Cup Noodles	★☆☆☆☆	swicy	✓								
Buldak Ramen Swicy	Pouch Noodles	★☆☆☆☆	swicy	✓								
Buldak Ramen Jjajang Big Bowl	Cup Noodles	★★★☆☆	jjajang					✓	✓			
ซัมยัง บูลดัก ดัมพ์ลิง กิมจิ	Snacks	★★★★☆	kimchi							✓		
Buldak Zzaldduk 2X	Snacks	★★★★☆	2x					✓	✓	✓		
Buldak Ramen Cream Carbonara Big Bowl	Cup Noodles	★★☆☆☆	cream-carbonara			✓		✓	✓			
ซัมยัง เอ็กซ์ตรีม บูลดัก ฮอต ชิคเก้น ราเมง คัพ	Cup Noodles	★★★★★	3x							✓		
ซัมยัง สไปซี่ ซีซั่น ชิคเก้น บูลดัก ราเมง	Pouch Noodles	★★☆☆☆	spicy-seasoned-chicken							✓		
ซัมยัง หม่าล่า บูลดัก ราเมง	Pouch Noodles	★★★★☆	mala							✓		
Buldak Ramen 3X	Pouch Noodles	★★★★★	3x			✓		✓	✓	✓		
Buldak Ramen Kimchi	Pouch Noodles	★★★★☆	stew					✓	✓			
Buldak Ramen Lovely Hot	Pouch Noodles	★★☆☆☆	lovely-hot					✓	✓			
Buldak Ramen Jjajang	Pouch Noodles	★★★☆☆	jjajang			✓		✓	✓			
Buldak Hot Sauce 2X	Sauces	★★★★★	2x					✓				
Buldak Zzaldduk Original	Snacks	★★★☆☆	original				✓	✓	✓	✓		
Buldak Spicy Ramen Tomato Pasta	Pouch Noodles	★★★★☆	tomato				✓	✓	✓			
야키소바 불닭볶음면	Cup Noodles	★★★★☆	yakisoba		✓			✓	✓			
Buldak Wide Glass Noodle Rose	Snacks	★★☆☆☆	rose	✓	✓							
Buldak Tteokbokki Carbonara	Snacks	★★★☆☆	carbonara	✓	✓		✓	✓	✓	✓		
Buldak Tteokbokki Original	Snacks	★★★★☆	original	✓	✓		✓	✓	✓	✓		
Buldak Dumpling Carbonara	Snacks	★★☆☆☆	carbonara	✓			✓			✓		
Buldak Dumpling Original	Snacks	★★★☆☆	original	✓			✓			✓		
Buldak Tteokbokki Original	Snacks	★★★☆☆	original	✓	✓							
Buldak Potato Chips Original	Snacks	★★★☆☆	original	✓								
Buldak Potato Chips Quattro cheese	Snacks	★★☆☆☆	quatro-cheese	✓								
Buldak Potato Chips Habanero lime	Snacks	★★☆☆☆	habanero-lime	✓								
Buldak Ramen Quattro Cheese Big Bowl	Cup Noodles	★★★☆☆	quatro-cheese	✓	✓	✓		✓	✓			
Buldak Ramen Habanero Lime Big Bowl	Cup Noodles	★★★★☆	habanero-lime	✓			✓	✓	✓			
Buldak Ramen Cheese Big Bowl	Cup Noodles	★★★☆☆	cheese	✓	✓	✓	✓	✓	✓	✓		
Buldak Ramen Carbonara Big Bowl	Cup Noodles	★★☆☆☆	carbonara	✓	✓	✓	✓	✓	✓	✓		
Buldak Ramen 2X Big Bowl	Cup Noodles	★★★★★	2x	✓				✓	✓	✓		
Buldak Ramen Original Big Bowl	Cup Noodles	★★★★☆	original	✓	✓	✓	✓	✓	✓	✓	✓	
Buldak Ramen Cheese Cup	Cup Noodles	★★★☆☆	cheese	✓		✓	✓	✓	✓	✓	✓	
Buldak Ramen Carbonara Cup	Cup Noodles	★★☆☆☆	carbonara	✓	✓	✓	✓	✓	✓	✓	✓	
Buldak Ramen 2X Cup	Cup Noodles	★★★★★	2x	✓		✓		✓	✓	✓		
Buldak Ramen Original Cup	Cup Noodles	★★★★☆	original	✓	✓	✓	✓	✓	✓	✓	✓	
Buldak Ramen Rose	Pouch Noodles	★★☆☆☆	rose	✓	✓			✓	✓	✓	✓	
Buldak Ramen Yakisoba	Pouch Noodles	★★★★☆	yakisoba	✓				✓	✓			
Buldak Ramen Habanero Lime	Pouch Noodles	★★★★☆	habanero-lime	✓		✓	✓	✓	✓	✓	✓	
Buldak Ramen Quattro Cheese	Pouch Noodles	★★★☆☆	quatro-cheese	✓	✓	✓		✓	✓	✓	✓	
Buldak Ramen Cream Carbonara	Pouch Noodles	★★☆☆☆	cream-carbonara	✓		✓	✓	✓	✓	✓	✓	
Buldak Ramen Carbonara	Pouch Noodles	★★☆☆☆	carbonara	✓	✓	✓	✓	✓	✓	✓	✓	
Buldak Ramen Cheese	Pouch Noodles	★★★☆☆	cheese	✓		✓	✓	✓	✓	✓	✓	
Buldak Ramen 2X	Pouch Noodles	★★★★★	2x	✓		✓	✓	✓	✓	✓	✓	
Buldak Ramen Original	Pouch Noodles	★★★★☆	original	✓	✓	✓	✓	✓	✓	✓	✓	
Buldak Hot Sauce Carbonara	Sauces	★★★★☆	carbonara	✓								
Buldak Hot Sauce Original	Sauces	★★★★☆	original	✓	✓			✓	✓			
Buldak Hot Sauce Carbonara	Sauces	★★★★☆	carbonara	✓	✓	✓	✓	✓	✓	✓	✓	
Buldak Hot Sauce 2xSpicy	Sauces	★★★★★	2x	✓	✓	✓	✓		✓	✓	✓	
Buldak Hot Sauce Original	Sauces	★★★★☆	original	✓	✓	✓	✓	✓	✓	✓	✓	
Buldak Ramen Taco Cup	Cup Noodles	★★★☆☆	taco	✓								
Buldak Ramen Taco Big Bowl	Cup Noodles	★★★☆☆	taco	✓								
Buldak Ramen Taco	Pouch Noodles	★★★☆☆	taco	✓								
푸팟퐁커리 불닭볶음면	Cup Noodles	★★☆☆☆	poo-pad-pong-curry		✓							
Buldak Fried Rice Original	Snacks	★★★☆☆	original	✓	✓							
Buldak Fried Rice Carbonara	Snacks	★★☆☆☆	carbonara	✓	✓		✓					
마라 불닭납작당면	Snacks	★★★☆☆	mala		✓							
불닭납작당면	Snacks	★★★☆☆	original		✓							
불닭마요	Sauces	★☆☆☆☆	mayo		✓							
불닭소스	Sauces	★★★★☆	original		✓			✓	✓	✓		
로제 불닭볶음면	Cup Noodles	★★☆☆☆	rose		✓			✓	✓		✓	
불닭볶음탕면	Cup Noodles	★★★☆☆	stew		✓			✓	✓		✓	
불닭볶음탕면	Pouch Noodles	★★★☆☆	stew		✓	✓	✓	✓		✓	✓	

== See also ==
- Buldak
- Instant noodle
- Korean cuisine
- Kim Jung-soo (businesswoman)
