= Shrimp chips =

Shrimp chips may refer to:

- Prawn cracker, a Southeast Asian shrimp cracker which comes in many varieties
- Kappa Ebisen, a popular shrimp flavored Japanese snack
- Saeukkang, a popular Korean shrimp cracker, produced by Nongshim
