= Honey Butter Chips =

South Korean potato chip brand

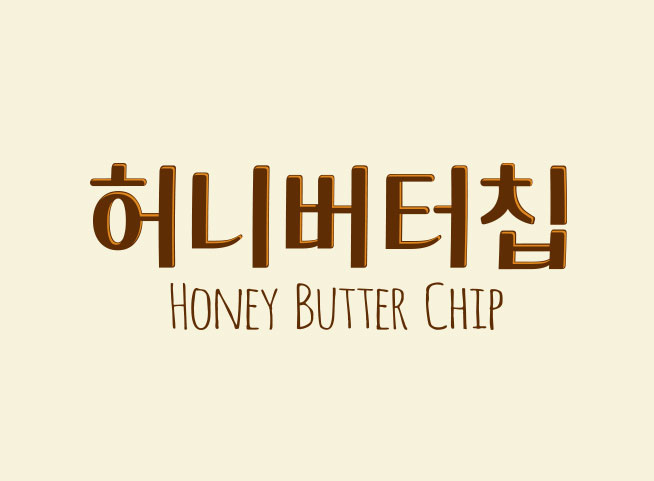
Honey Butter Chips logo

Honey Butter Chips (Korean: 허니버터칩) is a brand of fried potato chips manufactured by Haitai Calbee and sold in South Korea. The snacks were first made available in August of 2014, and they are renowned for their rise to popularity through social media viral marketing from late 2014 to early 2015. The product was created by Korean confectioner Haitai in a joint effort with Japanese snack manufacturer Calbee. This snack was so popular that it created a trend called the Honey-Butter Craze among South Koreans. There have since been an emergence of competitor products that follow a similar formula to Honey Butter Chips due to its popularity.

The snack is called Happiness Butter Potato Chips (ポテトチップスしあわせバター) in Japan.

== Haitai-Calbee joint ventures ==
Calbee previously produced a Honey Butter Chip in 2012 for the Japanese market. Calbee set up a joint venture with Haitai and expanded its snack market to Korea in order to increase profits in the Japanese snack market.

== Honey Butter Craze ==
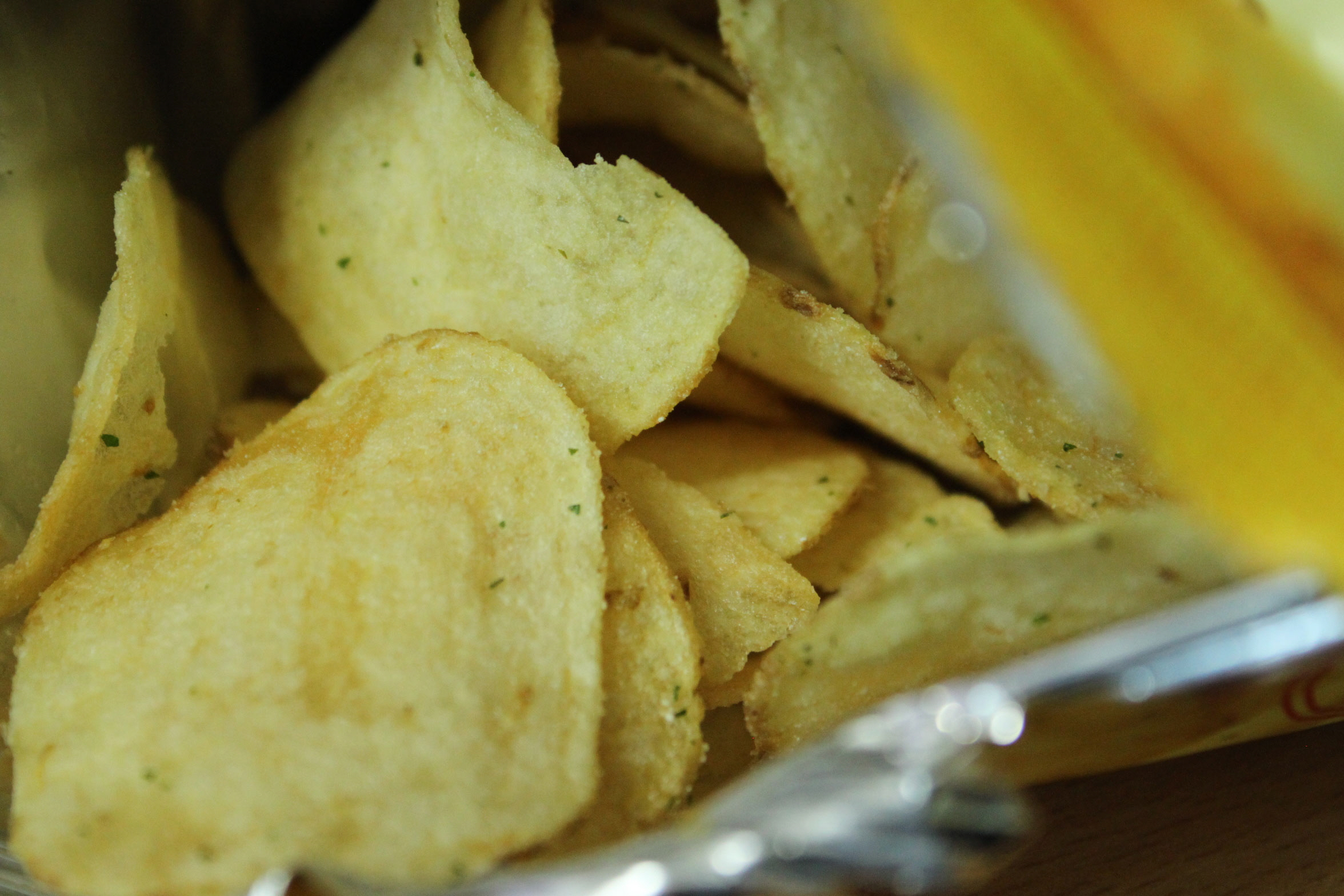
A bag of Honey Butter Chips

The Honey-Butter Craze, or Honey Butter Yeolpung (열풍; 熱風), is a craze for the Honey Butter Chip product which arose in August 2014. The formal version of Honey Butter Chip named 'Happiness Butter Potato Chips' was produced by Calbee in Japan in the year of 2012. This honey-flavored buttery potato chip did not gain popularity in Japan and was sold for a limited period of time. However, when Honey Butter Chip was introduced in Korea by Haitai-Calbee in August 2014, its popularity spread via social networks during the last quarter of 2014 and the first quarter of 2015. Haitai-Calbee was unavailable in stores and was being resold online for three times its original price.

To meet demand, Haitai-Calbee built a factory in South Korea that has been in operation since early 2016.

After 'Honey Butter Chip' was released in August, Haitai-Calbee officially announced that sales in January and February 2015 had reached 23 billion won (USD 20.3 million), and forecasted sales of one hundred billion won (USD one hundred million) by year-end.

=== Celebrity influence ===
The Honey Butter Craze spread even further when Korean celebrities started endorsing the product. K-pop stars such as Sooyoung of Girls' Generation, Siwon of Super Junior, and T-ara's Hyomin began posing in selfies with gilded Honey Butter bags propped beside their cheeks and posting the pictures online. On August 31, 2021 k-pop boy group MCND released their album "THE EARTH : SECRET MISSION Chapter.1" which features the song H.B.C, standing for Honey Butter Chip. Actress So Yoo-Jin posted a picture of a bag on her Instagram account. A popular news broadcaster for KBS even proclaimed that she was "laughing and crying over one bag of chips" and uploaded a picture of herself holding up the famously elusive golden yellow bag. On the May 23rd broadcast of MBC's My Little Television, rock singer Jung Joon Young reviewed and compared many types of honey-butter-flavored snacks in the Korean market.

=== Limited supply ===
The product went viral through social networks and achieved popularity in Korea. Haitai-Calbee temporarily suspended orders in November 2014 because of overwhelming demand. "Honey Butter Chip may be one of the most difficult products to buy these days," said a Korean convenience store owner. Many convenience stores put up paper signs with "Honey Butter Chip, sold out". Some stores made a 'Honey Butter Chip waiting list' for customers and limited the selling quantity to one bag for a person. Due to the scarcity, in December 2014, Honey Butter Chips were traded back and forth on e-commerce websites at inflated prices, reaching nearly 50 times the original cost of a 60-gram bag. In 2023, the Haitai Honey Butter Chip could be found on Amazon for almost $56 USD.

To keep up with the high demand for Honey Butter Chip, Haitai-Calbee has raised its production by a factor of three and put its production line in full operation for 24 hours. Although the product was in short supply, the company did not further increase production because the actual demand can be uncertain and crazes can be short-lived.

== Line extensions ==
- Jagabee Honey Mild
  - Honey butter potato fries created by Haitai-Calbee
- Honey Tong Tong
  - Ridged triangle potato chips created by Haitai (not joint with Calbee) after the viral popularity of Honey Butter Chips

=== Special editions ===
- Honey Butter Chip Special Edition - Canada Maple Syrup
- Honey Butter Chip Special Edition - Cherry Blossom
- Honey Butter Chip Winter Warmers - Almond Caramel
- Honey Butter Chip Special Edition - Lavender & Blueberry
- Honey Butter Chip Special Edition - Chou Cream & Maple Syrup
- Honey Butter Chip Special Edition - Fromage Blanc
- Honey Butter Chip Save the Date - Wedding Cake
- Honey Butter Chip Special Edition - Sentimental Season - Mocha
- Honey Butter Chip Especial Edicion - Dulce de Leche

== Competitor products ==
After Honey Butter Chip became famous, many companies produced similar products which plagiarize the name, design, and flavor of its original to take advantage of the popularity of Honey Butter Chip. The word 'Honey Butter' is used by companies to promote and attract their food products to the consumers. A major Korean food maker, Nongshim has launched 'Sumi Chip Honey Mustard' in December, whose taste is similar to Honey Butter Chip. Unlike Honey Butter Chip, the Sumi chip was easier to find in many stores. Therefore, consumers started to buy the Sumi chip as a replacement. The Sumi Chip became more popular than its original, and sold four times more than the Honey Butter Chip with average of ten thousands pack per day. Nongshim has achieved the new record of having the greatest monthly sales in the Korean snack industry. Because of the supply shortage and many other copy products, Honey Butter Chip which once had the highest sales during the last quarter of 2014 fell to third place in the snack sales of January and February, 2015.

- NongShim "Sumi Potato Chips"
  - Due to the limited manufacturing of the original Honey Butter Chips, the product became increasingly difficult to find, prompting South Korean food manufacturer NongShim to release their own similar product in mass volumes. With the widespread availability of NongShim's chips, Sumi Potato Chips overtook Honey Butter Chips in sales.
- Lotte "Honey Drunken Potato Chips" (꿀먹은 감자칩)

Other products are not only limited in the area of confectioneries and food products, but even in other goods such as cosmetic products made of Honey and Butter and furniture designed in the shape of pack of Honey Butter Chip.

== Recipes on YouTube ==
During the craze, homemade Honey Butter Chip recipes began to be posted on YouTube. Using ingredients that can be easily found, people can make their own potato chips with similar flavors to the original product.
