= Cup noodle =

Instant noodles sold in a cup

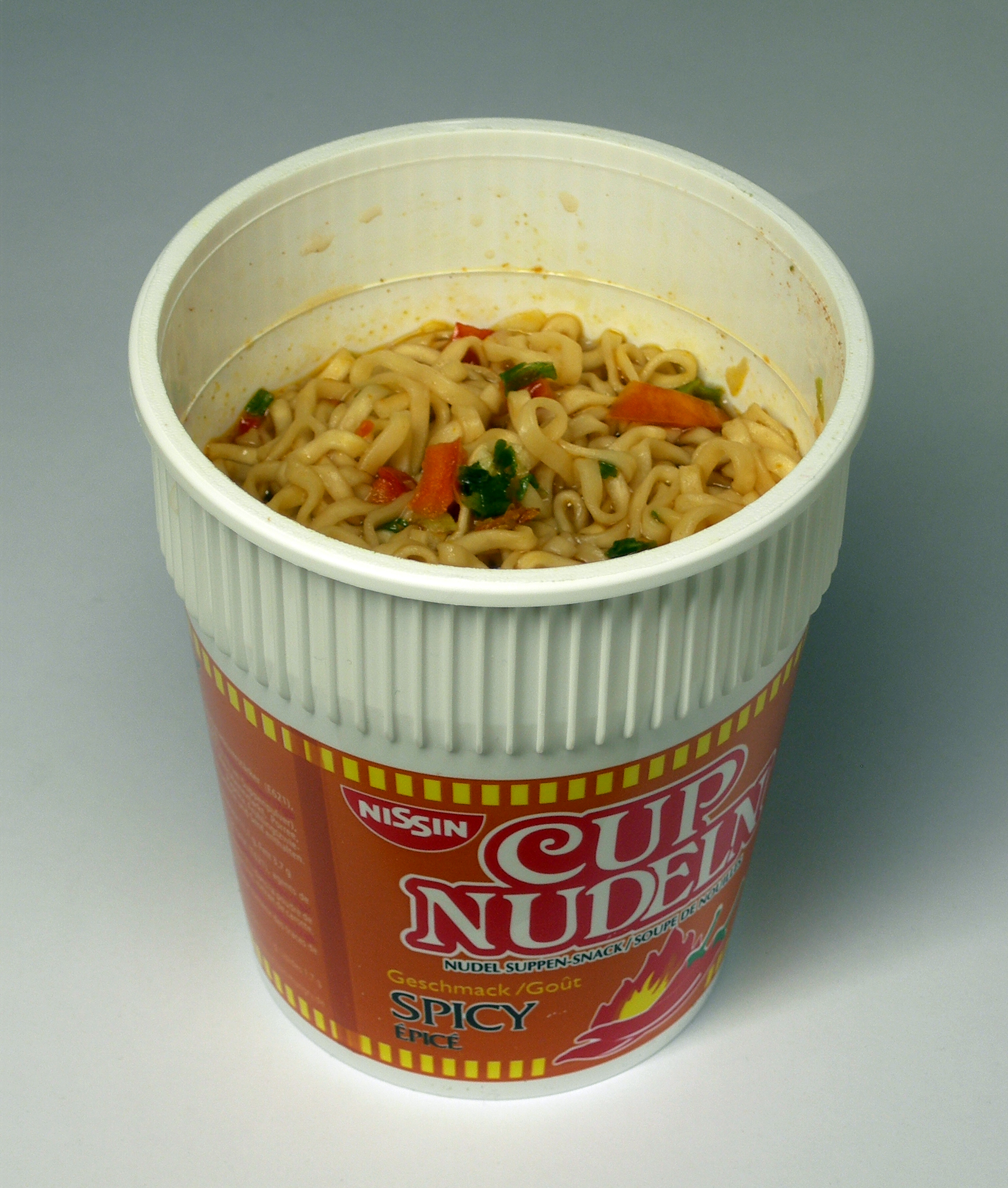
- German cup nudeln made by Nissin
- Type: Instant noodles
- Place of origin: Japan
- Region or state: Tokyo
- Created by: Momofuku Ando
- Invented: 1971; 55 years ago
- Other information: "Cup Noodle" and "Cup Noodles" are registered trademarks of Nissin Foods

A cup noodle is an instant ramen product in a disposable cup, first developed in 1971 and manufactured by the Japanese food company Nissin Foods. The product was first introduced in the United States as "Cup O' Noodles" in 1972, before being renamed to "Cup Noodles" in 1993.

== History ==
Instant noodles were originally invented in 1958 by Momofuku Ando, the founder of Nissin Foods. Ando recognized that the bowls used to package instant noodles in Asia were not common in the US, so he designed the paper cup format to make the product more convenient for American consumers.

In 1971, Nissin Foods introduced Nissin Cup Noodles, a cup noodle to which boiling water is added to cook the noodles. A further innovation added dried vegetables to the cup, creating a complete instant soup dish. Both Cup Noodle and Cup Noodles are registered trademarks of Nissin Foods. The three original Cup O' Noodles flavors were beef, chicken, and shrimp, with pork flavor added in 1976.

Today, Cup Noodles is sold in over 100 countries worldwide, with the cumulative global sales exceeding 50 billion servings as of 2021. The brand's success has led to the creation of a Cup Noodle Museum in Yokohama, Japan, which showcases the history and innovation behind the product.

== Precooked instant noodles sold in a cup by country ==
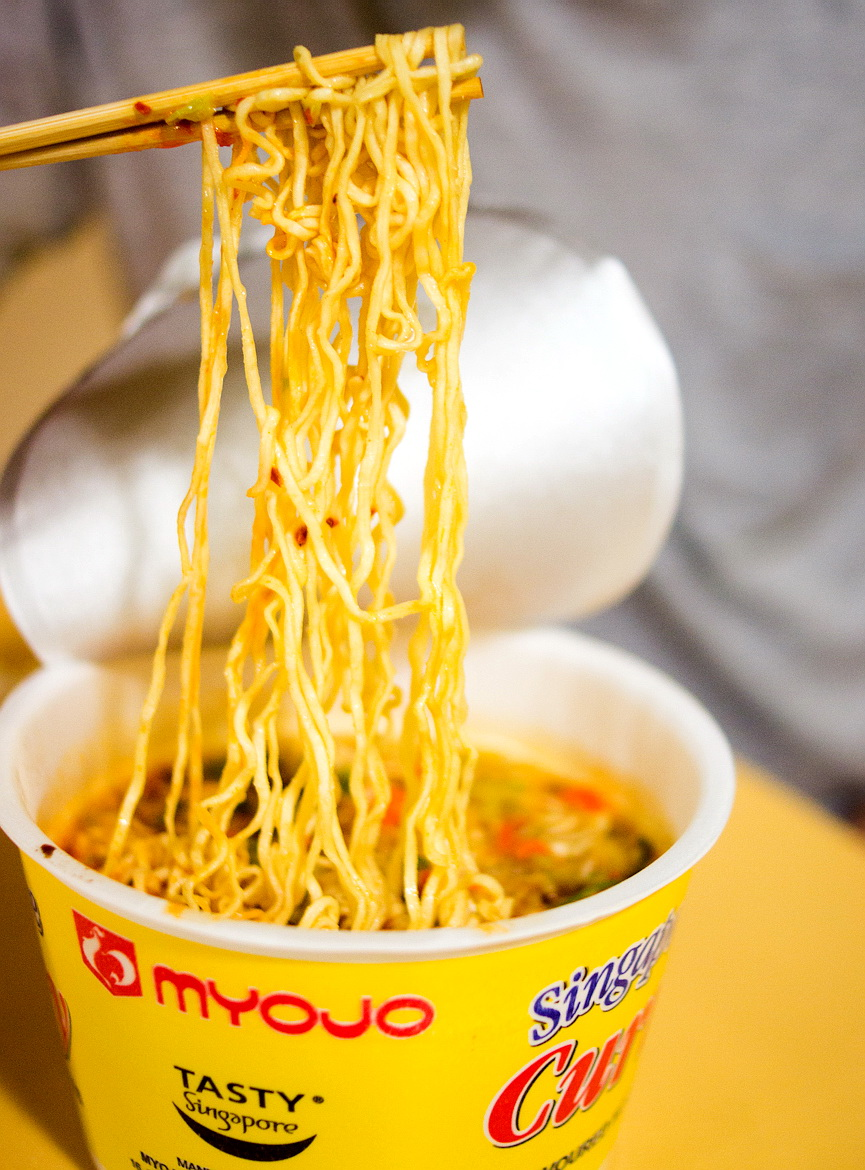
Curry-flavored cup noodles in Singapore

=== Brazil ===
The Cup Noodles brand began to be sold in the country by Nissin in 1997 in a timid way, but it began to be marketed heavily in the 2020s with commercials and even receiving some exclusive flavors like feijoada and nacho. Some brands imported from Asia such as Nongshim can also be found in oriental product stores.

=== India ===
A variety of cup noodles are sold in India. It includes brands like Master-Cho, Nissin, and Nongshim. These companies launched a few different cup noodles in India to suit local tastes, eg: Mazedaar Masala Cup Noodles, by Nissin Foods.

=== Mexico ===
Precooked instant noodle was introduced in 1990 by Maruchan. Due to its popularity, instant noodles are often referred to simply as "Maruchan". Today, many local brands such as "La Moderna" and "Herdez" have developed their own instant noodles, along Nissin, which is also a newcomer.

=== Philippines ===
Brands available in the Philippines include Lucky Me!, Nissin (under Nissin-Universal Robina, a joint venture of Nissin Foods and Universal Robina), QuickChow, Tekki Shomen and Ho-Mi.

=== South Korea ===
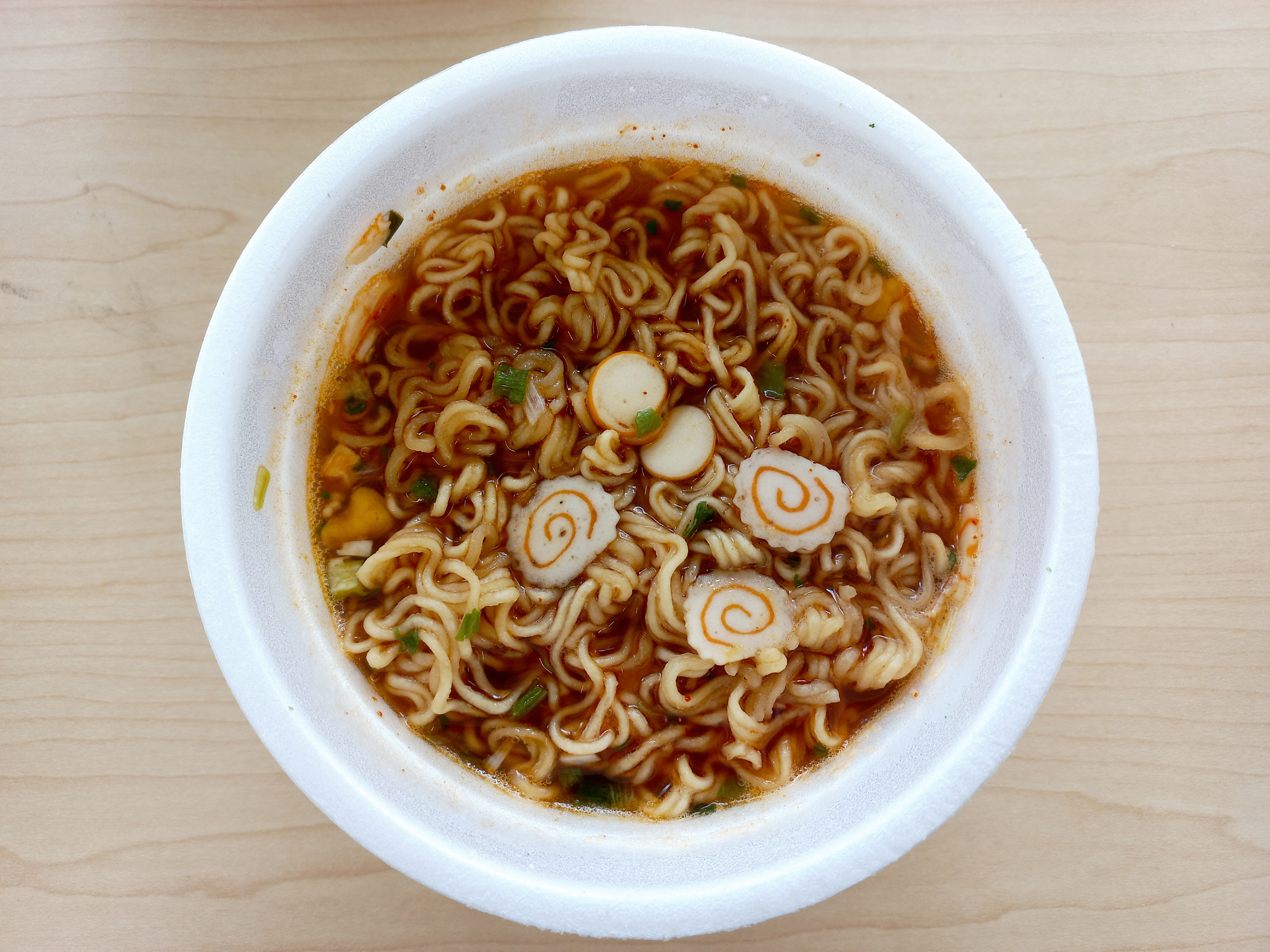
South Korean Nongshim's Bowl Noodle Soup

Keop-ramyeon is famous in South Korea. Popular instant noodles include Nongshim's Bowl Noodle Soup, Shin Cup Noodle Soup and Samyang's Hot Chicken Flavor Ramen. South Korea has the largest quantity of consumption of instant noodle or precooked instant noodle's country per year. Based on market research, males consume more precooked instant noodle than females in South Korea. It is the second largest food type after steamed rice that contributes to the overall energy intake of individuals in South Korea. Furthermore, the younger generation (20 to 49 years old) are more likely to consume them and the demographic of consuming bowl-type noodles are the middle class or high class. Samyang Foods produced the first container noodle in Korea, Cup Ramen, in March 1972, and Nongshimsa developed the first bowl-shaped bowl noodle in Korea in November 1981. Since then, several types of cup noodles have been developed. Typical cup noodles include Nongshim's Shin Ramen, Ottogi's Jin Ramen, and Paldo's Lunch Box. With the release of Buldak Stir-fried Noodles in Samyang since 2012, the popularity of spicy ramen spread through SNS (Social Networking Services) in Korea. As it was released as a cup noodle as well, "Big Cup Buldak Stir-Fried Noodles" became popular, with consumers consuming more convenient cup noodles. In addition, as recipes for eating triangular kimbap and cheese together began to spread on the Internet and SNS to challenge the spicy taste, a new method of "mixing" the existing ramen noodles, which are easy to mix, has increased in the process. In the same vein, sales of both cup noodles and soup-free bibimmyeon in cup noodles have increased.

=== Sweden ===
Precooked instant noodles are usually sold for 10 SEK per package.

=== United Kingdom ===
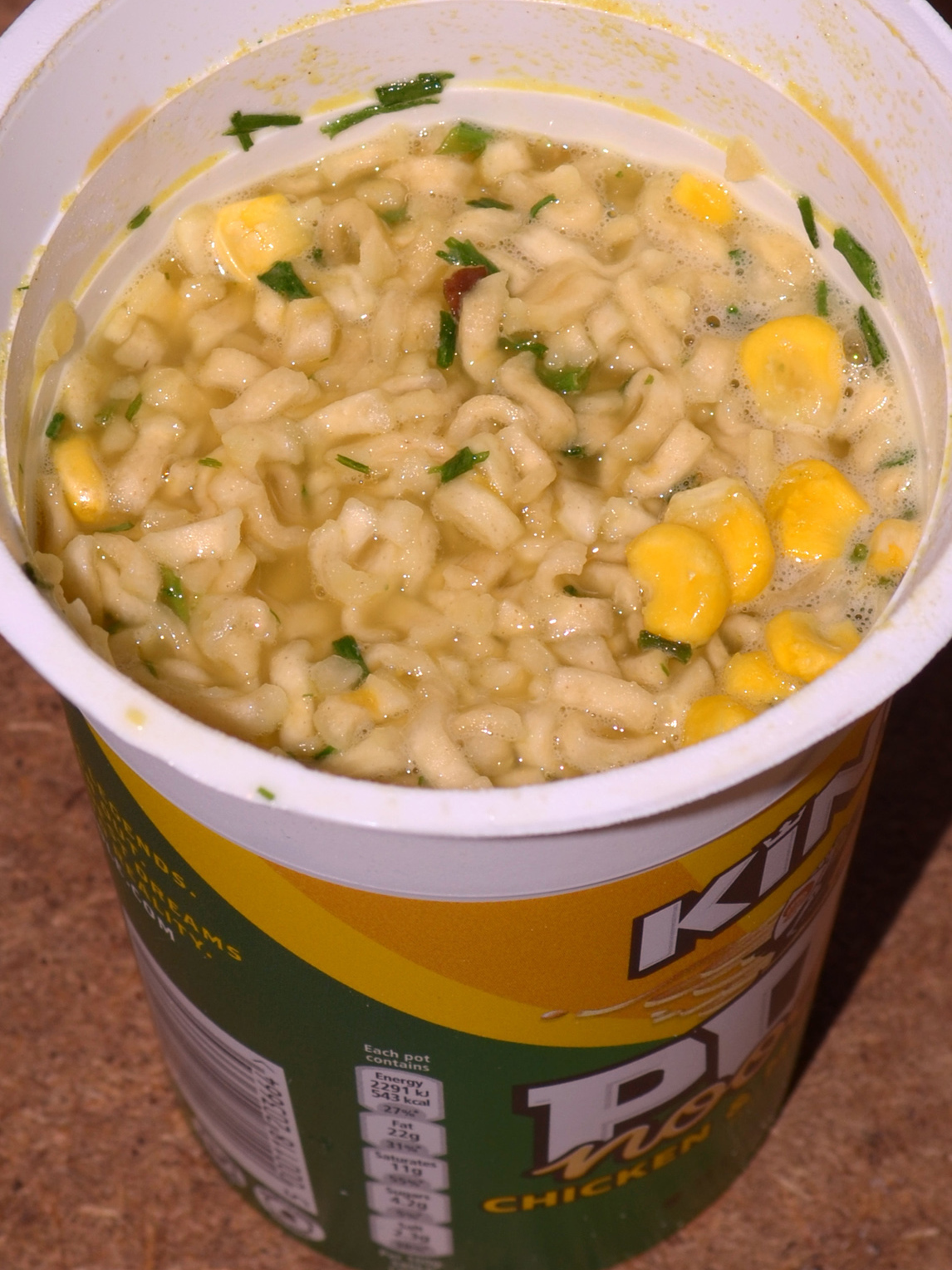
Chicken and mushroom Pot Noodle cooked according to instructions

A common form of instant noodles in Britain is Pot Noodle, a cup noodle first marketed by Golden Wonder in 1977, and acquired by Unilever in 1995. These use artificial flavorings and are generally suitable for vegetarians (there is no chicken in "Chicken and mushroom flavour" Pot Noodles, for example) and are sold by virtually every major supermarket chain, general groceries shops, and convenience stores. Boiling water is added to the noodles to cook them.

=== United States ===
In 1972, Nissin Foods introduced "Nissin Cup Noodles" in a foam food cup, which led to an upsurge in popularity. Soon after, many other competing companies were offering similar instant noodle products (e.g. Maruchan's Instant Lunch).

== See also ==
- CupNoodles Museum
