= Shin Dong-won =

South Korean businessman

- Born: January 9, 1958 (age 68); Pusan, Korea
- Education: Korea University
- Occupation: Businessman
- Known for: Chairman and CEO of Nongshim
- Relatives: Shin Choon-ho (father); Shin Kyuk-ho (uncle); Shin Dong-bin (cousin)

Shin Dong-won (Korean: 신동원; Hanja: 辛東原; born 1958) is a South Korean businessman. He is the chairman and CEO of South Korean food and beverage conglomerate Nongshim.

== Biography ==
Shin is the eldest son of the late founder and chairman of Nongshim Group Shin Choon-ho. His uncle, Shin Kyuk-ho, founded the South Korean conglomerate Lotte Corporation. The Chairman of Lotte, Shin Dong-bin, is his cousin.

He was born in Busan in 1958 and attended Shinil High School in Seoul. He studied chemical engineering at Korea University and earned a master's degree in International Trade, also from Korea University.

Shin started working for Nongshim in 1979 and served as a senior managing director from 1994 to 1996. He became Nongshim's CEO in 2000 and Chairman in 2021, after the passing of his father. Shin seeks to expand the company's international presence. He is credited for launching the Jjawang, which became Nongshim's second best-selling product in South Korea, after the company's signature product Shin Ramyun, and helped boost the company's share of the domestic instant noodle market from 59 percent in 2015 to 63 percent in 2020.

Shin is currently the largest shareholder of Nongshim Holdings, the largest shareholder of Nongshim, with a 42.92% stake in Nongshim Holdings.

== Personal life and family ==
Shin is married to Min Sun-young, daughter of Min Chul-ho, former president of Tongyang Securities. His eldest son, Shin Sang-yeol, joined Nongshim in 2019 after graduating from Columbia University.
