= Kappa Ebisen =

Japanese shrimp flavored snack

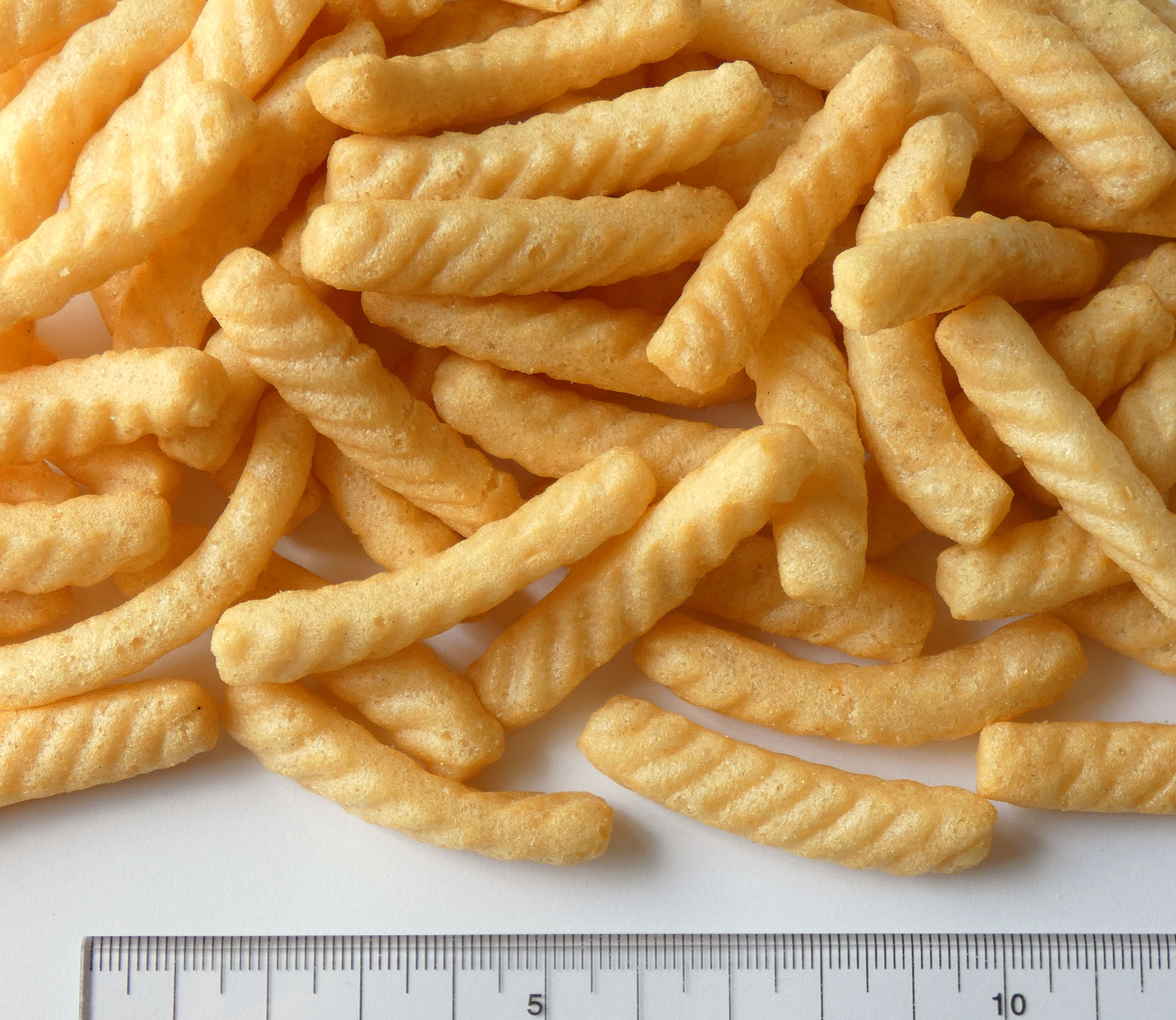
- Type: Snack
- Place of origin: Japan
- Created by: Calbee
- Main ingredients: Wheat flour, vegetable oil, starch, shrimp, sugar

Kappa Ebisen (かっぱえびせん) is a Japanese snack food produced by Calbee of Japan in Hatsukaichi, Hiroshima.

The primary ingredients of Kappa Ebisen are wheat flour, vegetable oil, starch, shrimp, sugar, salt, baking powder, amino acid and sweetening.

== History ==
Kappa Ebisen was first produced and sold by Calbee in 1964 and has gained wide popularity among Japanese consumers as a snack food. Its simplicity makes it a popular snack in many settings, and is often a popular choice for karaoke or as a bar snack.

Calbee began exporting Kappa Ebisen to Hawaii and Southeast Asia in 1966. It is now sold internationally, with different flavors of Kappa Ebisen such as curry or spicy available.

A similar product called Saewoo Kkang (새우깡) in South Korea has been produced by Nongshim since 1971.
