= Jagarico =

Japanese snack product

Jagarico じゃがりこ
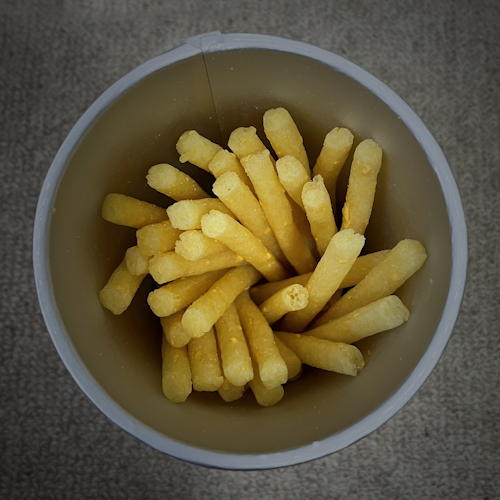
- Product type: Potato snack food
- Produced by: Calbee
- Country: Japan
- Introduced: 1995; 31 years ago

Jagarico is a family of salty snack products made primarily from processed fried potatoes. Introduced in 1995 by Calbee, Jagarico could be described as rod-shaped potato chips. According to Barabara Zec, they "have a similar appearance to French fries."

== Product description ==
This product is sold in packages of various sizes ranging from 38 to 108 grams (1.3 to 3.8 oz). The standard size of this product is 7 cm (2.8 in) in length and roughly 7 mm (0.28 in) in diameter. Since 2012, 8.5 cm (3.3 in) "long" size products have also been marketed. Moreover, thinner versions with a diameters of about 5.25 mm (0.207 in) began to hit store shelves in 2022. These pre-packaged potato sticks are available in many flavors throughout Japan and in at least ten other countries. To boost sales, Calbee regularly introduces new flavors while taking those items with sluggish sales out of production. For example, a "Salt and Sesame Oil" incarnation of this product was launched in 2016. At roughly the same time their "Jurassic Salt" and "Cheese Curry" flavors were discontinued due to tepid sales. Moreover, in 2020 a shorter garlic-flavored version of this product that targets older consumers hit the market.

According to a 2018 report, about 14.5% of Calbee's total 2017 Q1 sales were derived from Jagarico products. During the third financial quarter of 2021 Jagarico sales in Japan amounted to about 34.5 billion yen, and overseas sales are an increasingly important revenue source. According to a 2017 survey by Keio Group, Jagarico was ranked as the fourth most popular snack in the Tokyo area. However, the sample size for that survey was not specified.

== Similar products ==
Although the ingredients of Jagarico are similar to many mass-marketed potato chips, their shape resembles a traditional Japanese candied sweet potato snack known as kempi. According to a 1999 US Department of Agriculture report, this product is classified as a fabricated potato snack. However, it resembles other shoestring potato snacks such as Koikeya's "Stick Karamucho", Morinaga's "Potelong", and Seijō Ishii's "Miraku Nori". Jagarico is also related to another Calbee product known as Jagabee. Whereas Jagabee are somewhat thick and made from unhusked whole potatoes, Jagarico are usually thinner and made from skinned potatoes. According to Onishi, Calbee tailors its products to specific audiences and Jagarico was product designed primarily for teenage women, whereas Jagabee targets older consumers.

The success of many Jagarico products has spawned a number of derivative snacks. For example, around 1998 Calbee began marketing a sweet potato version of Jagarico known as "Satsumariko". Moreover, a corn version of this product known as "Tomorico" has been sold nationwide since 2018. That same year, a soybean incarnation of Jagarico known as "Edamarico" hit store shelves in Japan. Furthermore, a thicker processed potato product known as "Poteriko" was launched in 2021.
