= Haitai =

South Korean confectionery company

- Hangul: 해태제과식품
- Hanja: 海陀製菓食品
- RR: Haetae jegwa sikpum
- MR: Haet'ae chegwa sikp'um

Haitai (Korean: 해태) is a South Korean company based in Seoul. Its main businesses are retail and instant foods, especially confectionery, beverage and ice cream.

The company was founded on October 3, 1945, and employs 3900 people at 8 plants in Cheonan, Anyang, Hayang, Gwangju, Cheongju, Munmak-eup, and Okcheon.

It was acquired by another Korean company, Crown Confectionery, in October 2004.

== Products ==
=== Oh! Yes Choco Cake ===
Oh! Yes Choco Cake (오예스) is a confectionery created by Haitai. Oh! Yes Choco Cakes are square cakes that come in a box. Each box contains a dozen cakes, each cake individually wrapped. The cake consists of a custard-like chocolate layer that is sandwiched between two white cake layers (sponge cake). The exterior of the cake is covered with chocolate and is decorated with a wavy drizzle of dark chocolate for the outer design.

Oh! Yes Choco Cake is imported and distributed by :

- USA Haitai, Inc.
- Philippines Dynamex Inc.
- Canada Redfrog Enterprises Ltd.

=== Honey Series ===
Haitai is responsible for catapulting the honey butter craze in South Korea. Starting in 2014, the company started with the Honey Butter Chip and successively released Honey Tong Tong, Honey Corn Pop, and other products. Many other food companies followed suit, releasing their own line of honey butter flavored snacks and confectionaries.

== See also ==
- Economy of South Korea
- Confectionery
- Beverage
- Ice Cream
- Crown Confectionery
