= Shin Choon-ho =

South Korean businessman (1930–2021)

- Born: 1 December 1930; Ulsan, Korea
- Died: 27 March 2021 (aged 90); Seoul, South Korea
- Education: Dong-A University
- Occupation: Businessman
- Known for: Founder of Nongshim
- Children: 5, including Shin Dong-won
- Relatives: Shin Kyuk-ho (brother)

Korean name
- Hangul: 신춘호
- Hanja: 辛春浩
- RR: Sin Chunho
- MR: Sin Ch'unho

Shin Choon-ho (Korean: 신춘호; 1 December 1930 – 27 March 2021) was a South Korean businessman who founded Nongshim in 1965.

== Biography ==
Shin Choon-ho was born on 1 December 1930 in Ulju County, Ulsan, Korea and was the third eldest son in the family. His older brother Shin Kyuk-ho was the founder of the Korean-Japanese conglomerate Lotte Corporation.

He graduated from Dong-A University in Busan in 1958 after serving as a police officer. He moved to Japan to help his brother with Lotte's confectionery business shortly afterwards.

Shin founded Lotte Industrial Company, his own business separate from the existing company, in 1965 to focus on the ramyeon business. In 1978, he renamed the company Nongshim, which means "farmer's heart," after his brother objected to his proposal to produce instant noodles. The relationship between the two brothers reportedly soured, and the two never reconciled.

Under Shin's leadership, Nongshim became South Korea's largest instant noodles maker and the fifth-largest in the world, and introduced popular products such as the Saeukkang, Shin Ramyun, Chapaghetti, and Neoguri.

He died on 27 March 2021 at Seoul National University Hospital. Shin is survived by his wife Kim Nak-yang, and five children. His eldest son, Shin Dong-won, became chairman of Nongshim.
