= Seabrook Potato Crisps =

UK brand of crisps

Seabrook Crisps Ltd
- Company type: Subsidiary
- Industry: Crisps
- Founded: 1945; 81 years ago
- Founder: Charles Brook
- Headquarters: Bradford, England
- Key people: Jonathan Shuttleworth (CEO); Daniel Woodwards (COO); Jon Wood (Commercial Director)
- Net income: £28 million
- Number of employees: c. 150
- Parent: Calbee UK
- Website: seabrookcrisps.com

Seabrook Crisps (often shortened to Seabrook's) is a UK brand of crisps produced in Bradford, West Yorkshire, England, by Seabrook Crisps Ltd.

== History ==
The company was founded in 1945 by Charles Brook, and the name supposedly arose because of an error in a photo-processing shop; instead of writing "C. Brook" on a film, a clerk wrote "Seabrook". Original production was in Allerton, but in 1979–80 a larger factory opened in the Princeville area of Bradford; production continued at the Allerton factory until 2004. Seabrook's crisps are distributed widely in the north of England. Seabrook used to be available by mail order direct from the manufacturer, but are now only available from retail outlets or third party online retailers.

Most of the potatoes used by the company are grown within 50 miles of the Bradford headquarters, Seabrook House. The crisps, sold in a variety of pack sizes, are salted with sea salt and are produced in a range of new and traditional flavours. The brand is best known for its bold flavours.

In 2017, Seabrook Crisps employed about 150 people, and was 75% owned by LDC (Lloyds Development Capital) and 25% by the management team: Jonathan Shuttleworth (CEO), Daniel Woodwards (COO), Jon Wood (commercial director) and Paul Monk (chairman). The company turnover in 2017 was approximately £28 million per annum.

In October 2018, Seabrook Crisps was acquired by the UK subsidiary of Japanese snack company Calbee.
