= Saeukkang =

Korean snack

- Alternative names: Shrimp Cracker, Prawn Cracker
- Type: Snack
- Place of origin: South Korea
- Created by: Nongshim
- Invented: 1971
- Main ingredients: Rice, shrimp, sour mayonnaise wasabi
- Food energy (per serving): 435 kcal (1,820 kJ)
Nutritional value
(per serving)
- Protein: 6 g
- Fat: 23 g
- Carbohydrate: 56 g
- Other information: official website

Saeukkang (Korean: 새우깡; also called Shrimp Cracker) is a South Korean snack produced by South Korean company Nongshim since 1971. Around 90g of prawn crackers (around 4-5 sheets) are packaged in parchment paper.

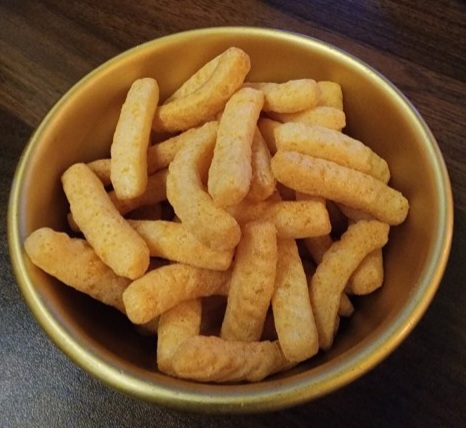

== History ==
=== Name ===
'Saeu' translates to shrimp in Korean. When Nongshim President Shin Choon-ho was looking for an appropriate name for the shrimp snack, he got an idea from his daughter mispronouncing Arirang (아라랑), pronouncing it 'Arikkang' (아리깡).

=== Development ===
The Nongshim company got ideas from the popular Japanese snack Kappa Ebisen made by Calbee. Nongshim spent more than a year attempting to reverse engineer the Kappa Ebisen snack and had particular difficulty with finding an appropriate temperature to cook the product. The company used large amounts of flour and shrimp during this process, using around 360 tons of flour.

=== Sales ===
Using the slogan We make our foods using our technology, Saeukkang was highly successful upon release and helped Nongshim, which previously had a low market share, to grow into what is now among the largest food and beverage companies in South Korea. Many trucks from all around South Korea traveled to Nongshim's factory in Daebang-dong to buy Saeukkang. Only three months after the initial release, Nongshim's sales had already increased by 350%. With their increased income, Nongshim was able to release other successful snacks: Banana Kick in 1978, Honey Twist Snack in 1979, and Potato Chip in 1980. As of 2013, Saeukkang's sales exceeded 7.5 billion packages. Saeukkang can now be found in 76 countries in stores like Walmart in the United States and Taobao in China.

== Variants ==
Nongshim produces different variants of Saeukkang. Other than the standard package (90g), the company introduced different sizes of Saeukkang:

- Mini Saeukkang (30g)
- Deluxe Saeukkang (400g).

Nongshim also offers Saeukkang in different flavors:

- Spicy Saeukkang
- Rice Saeukkang
- Sweet & Sour Chicken Saeukkang

== Marketing ==
=== TV CF ===
Lee Jong-suk, a Korean actor and model advertises Saeukkang .

Since the initial release of the snack, it has been advertised with the slogan "손이 가요~ 손이 가~새우깡에 손이 가요" (loosely translated as "Grab some here, grab some there. Grab Saeukkang anywhere". The slogan has been so successful that it is still used in Saeukkang ads today.

=== Fan Clubs ===
There are about 100 Saeukkang fan clubs in Korea's largest web portal, Naver, consisting of both younger and older generations.

== Criticism ==
- In 2005, criticism rose as the snack's shape and packaging looked similar to the Japanese snack Kappa Ebisen.
- In 2008, there was a report from a consumer that a mouse's head was found in one of Saeukkang's packaging. However, Nongshim not only concealed the report for a month before a formal investigation from the Ministry of Food and Drug Safety in Korea(MFDS) began but also the company did not recall their product. MFDS researched Nongshim's factories in Busan and Qingdao and announced by April of the same year that they failed to find any problems with the manufacturing process.
- In 2010, rice worms were found in Saeukkang, and MFDS drew a conclusion that rice worms were not from product production, but they were from processes of distribution to retail stores.
- In 2019, Nongshim initially planned to stop using shrimp from Gunsan, South Korea for the production of Saeukkang due to sea pollution in Korea. As the company had been using shrimp from both the United States and South Korea, the company claimed that the Gunsan's shrimp quality had decreased since 48 years ago. However, due to protests and complaints from Gunsan fishermen and Congress, Nongshim decided to use the top 10% highest quality Gunsan shrimp.

== See also ==
- Nongshim
- Snack
- Prawn Cracker
- Kappa Ebisen
