= Calbee =

Japanese snack food company

Calbee, Inc.

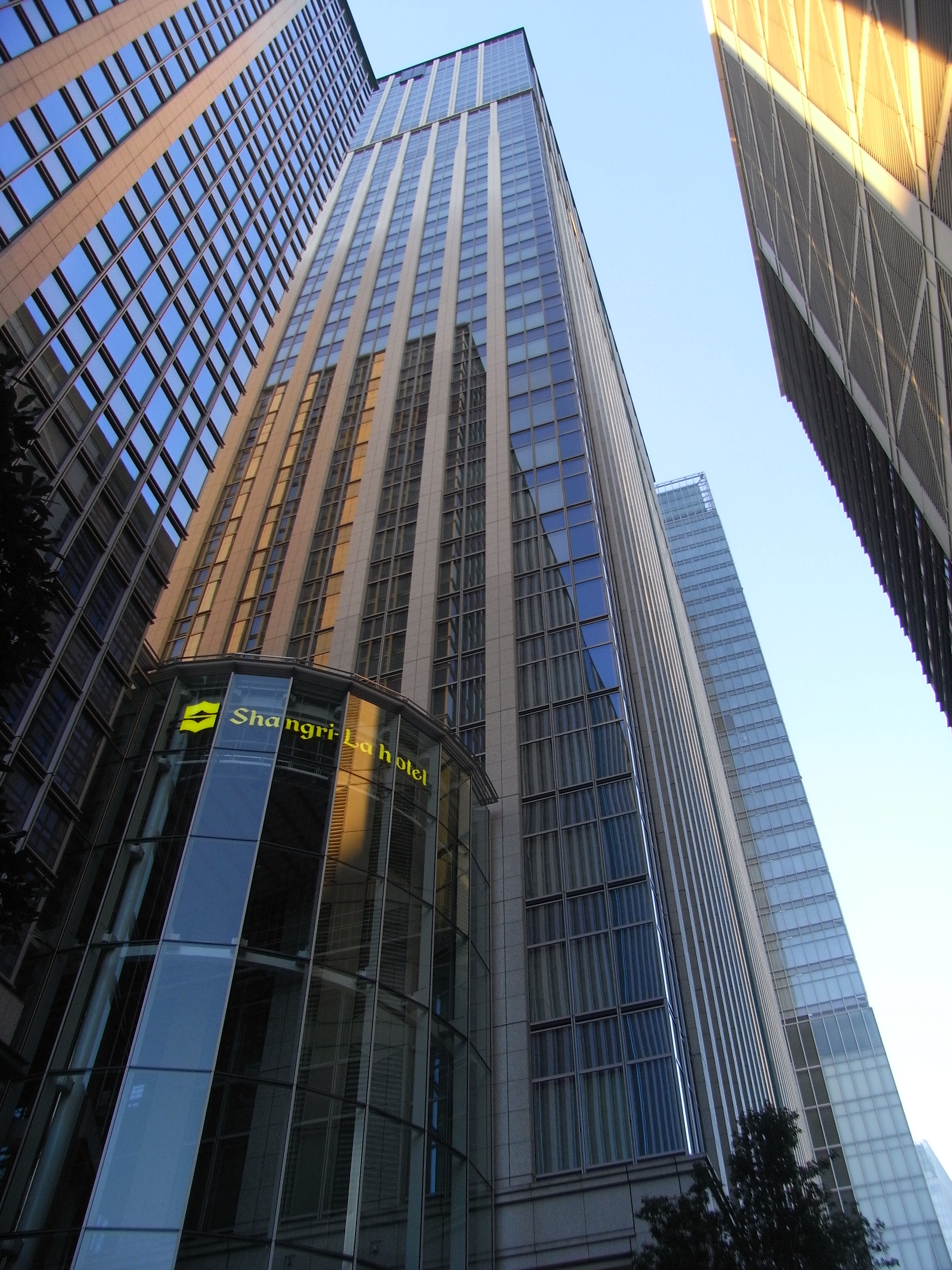
- Calbee headquarters
- Native name: カルビー株式会社
- Romanized name: Karubī Kabushiki-gaisha
- Type: Public (KK)
- Traded as: TYO: 2229
- Industry: Food
- Founded: 30 April 1949
- Headquarters: Marunouchi Trust Tower Main; Marunouchi, Chiyoda, Tokyo, Japan
- Key people: Makoto Ehara, Chairman and CEO
- Products: Snacks and other foods
- Revenue: ¥248,665 million (March 2019)
- Number of employees: 3,860
- Website: www.calbee.co.jp

Calbee, Inc. (カルビー株式会社, Karubī Kabushiki-gaisha) is a Japanese snack food maker and one of the largest snack food companies in Japan. It was founded on 30 April 1949 in Hiroshima and its headquarters are located in the Marunouchi Trust Tower Main in Marunouchi, Chiyoda, Tokyo. The company holds approximately 70% of Japan's potato chip market and its products are widely sold across Asia and in the United States. Calbee has been listed on the Tokyo Stock Exchange (ticker: 2229) since March 2011.

== History ==
=== Founding and early years ===
The company was founded in devastated post-war Hiroshima by Takashi Matsuo in 1949, initially under the name Matsuo Food Processing Co., Ltd. His first product was the Calbee Caramel, named after the words "calcium" and vitamin B1, nutrients that many people were lacking at the time. Due to the product's popularity, the company name was changed to Calbee Confectionery Co., Ltd. in 1955, and later to Calbee, Inc. when the headquarters were relocated to Tokyo.

In 1964, Calbee launched Kappa Ebisen, a shrimp-flavoured cracker that became the company's first major national hit. The product's advertising slogan, "Yamerarenai, tomaranai" (やめられない、止まらない, "Can't stop, won't stop"), became one of the most recognised advertising phrases in Japanese commercial history. Kappa Ebisen eventually achieved annual sales of ¥10 billion.

=== Expansion ===
In 1973, Calbee Moh Seng (previously the Moh Seng Importer & Exporter Private Limited) was integrated into Calbee. It started off as the sole distributor of Calbee goods in Singapore.

In the 1970s, Calbee partnered with Four Seas Group to introduce the company's products in Hong Kong. In 1994, the two companies formed the Calbee Four Seas joint venture company, and opened a new production plant in Tseung Kwan O Industrial Estate in 2000.

In 1980, Calbee established Calbee Tanawat in Thailand. Calbee International launched in Hong Kong in 1992.

In 2009, Calbee entered into a business and equity alliance with PepsiCo, Inc., a leading U.S. food company, and Japan Frito-Lay Ltd. became a subsidiary.

=== Stock listing and international growth ===
On 11 March 2011, Calbee was listed on the First Section of the Tokyo Stock Exchange. The same year, Haitai-Calbee Co., Ltd. was established in South Korea. In 2012, RDO-Calbee Foods, LLC changed its name to Calbee North America, LLC. PT. Calbee-Wings Food was established in Indonesia in 2013, and Calbee (UK) Ltd was established in the United Kingdom in 2014.

It launched operations at a new plant in the United States for making its mainstay products Kappa Ebisen shrimp chips and "Saya-endo" snow pea crisps on 18 September 2007.

In 2018, Calbee acquired British company Seabrook Crisps. In 2019, Calbee acquired Warnock Food Products.

== Products ==
Calbee's product development philosophy centres on what the company calls the "utilization of untapped food resources" — creating popular snacks from ingredients and by-products that were not previously used as snack foods.

=== Snacks ===
- Kappa Ebisen – Launched in 1964, this shrimp-flavoured cracker made from wheat flour and ground shrimp is Calbee's oldest and most iconic product. It was first exported to Hawaii and Southeast Asia in 1966 and is now sold internationally in multiple flavours.
- Potato Chips – Calbee entered the potato chip market in 1975. Its potato chips now command approximately 70% of the domestic Japanese market.
- Jagariko – Introduced in 1995, Jagariko consists of rod-shaped potato sticks sold in a distinctive cup container. The product is noted for its firm, crunchy texture, achieved by using off-specification potatoes unfit for regular potato chip production.
- Jagabee – A snack made from whole unhusked potatoes, noted for its minimal seasoning and unprecedented texture.
- Jaga Pokkuru – A souvenir snack produced at Calbee's Potato Farm in Hakodate, Hokkaido, using Hokkaido-grown Toyoshiro potatoes and Okhotsk sea salt. The product name is derived from Koropokkuru, the mythical little people of Ainu folklore.
- Sapporo Potato – A wheat-based snack developed as part of Calbee's effort to turn whole potatoes into new snack formats.

=== Cereals ===
- Frugra – A granola-style cereal product. Calbee entered the cereal market with the aim of establishing a new business line beyond snacks. In 2026, Calbee announced plans to begin local OEM production of Frugra in China.

== Sponsorship ==
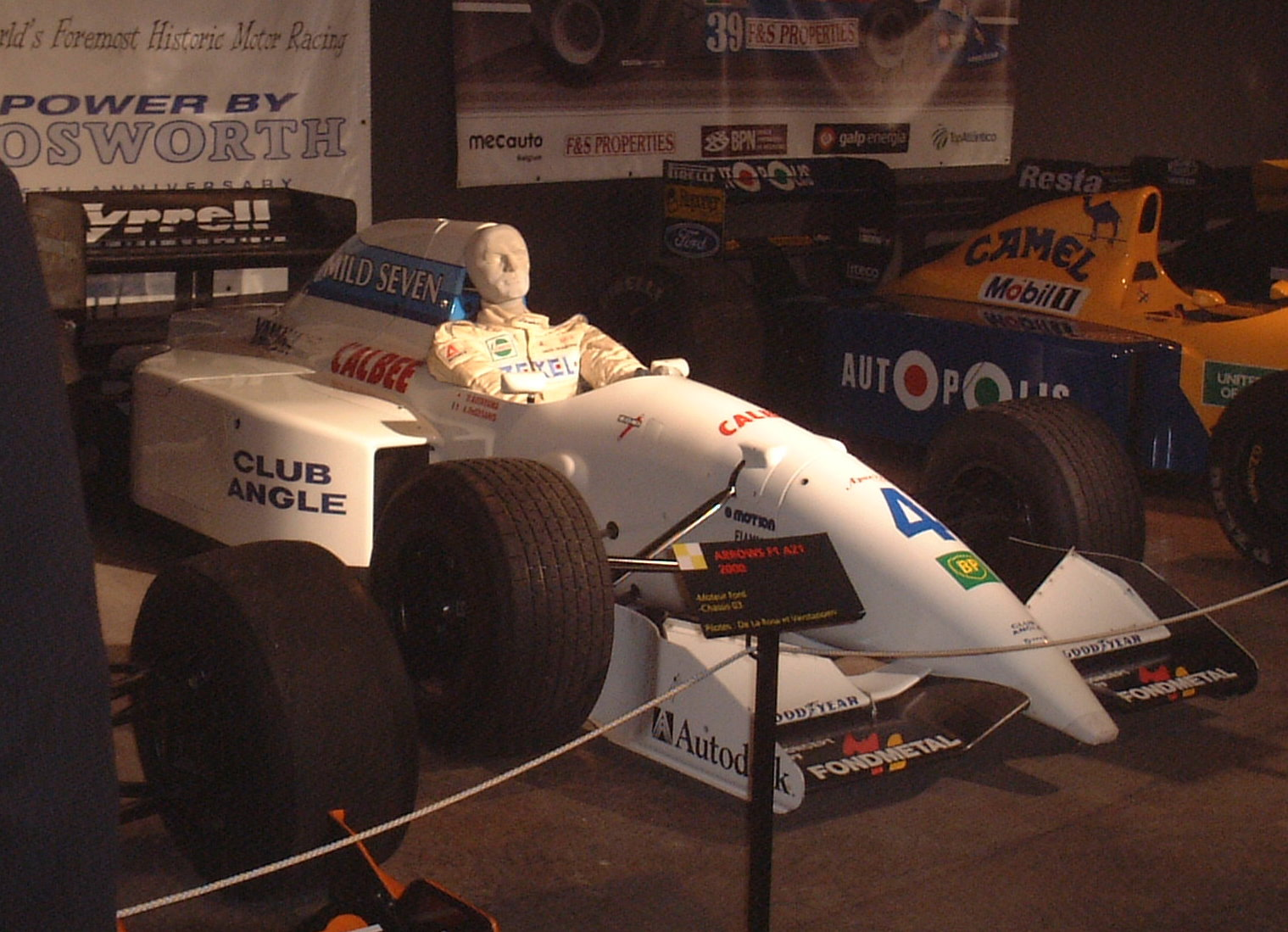
Tyrrell 021 with Calbee sponsorship.

Calbee sponsored the Tyrrell Racing F1 team from 1990 to 1994 when Japanese drivers Satoru Nakajima and Ukyo Katayama drove for the team.

The company was also one of the sponsors for the anime Tiger and Bunny. Alongside dmm.com, they sponsored the character of Dragon Kid.

Calbee is one of the sponsors of the Nippon Professional Baseball league; the sponsorship includes product tie-ins with the league, the teams and a collaboration with Konami's Pro Baseball Spirits A.
