= Shin Ramyun =

South Korean brand of instant noodle

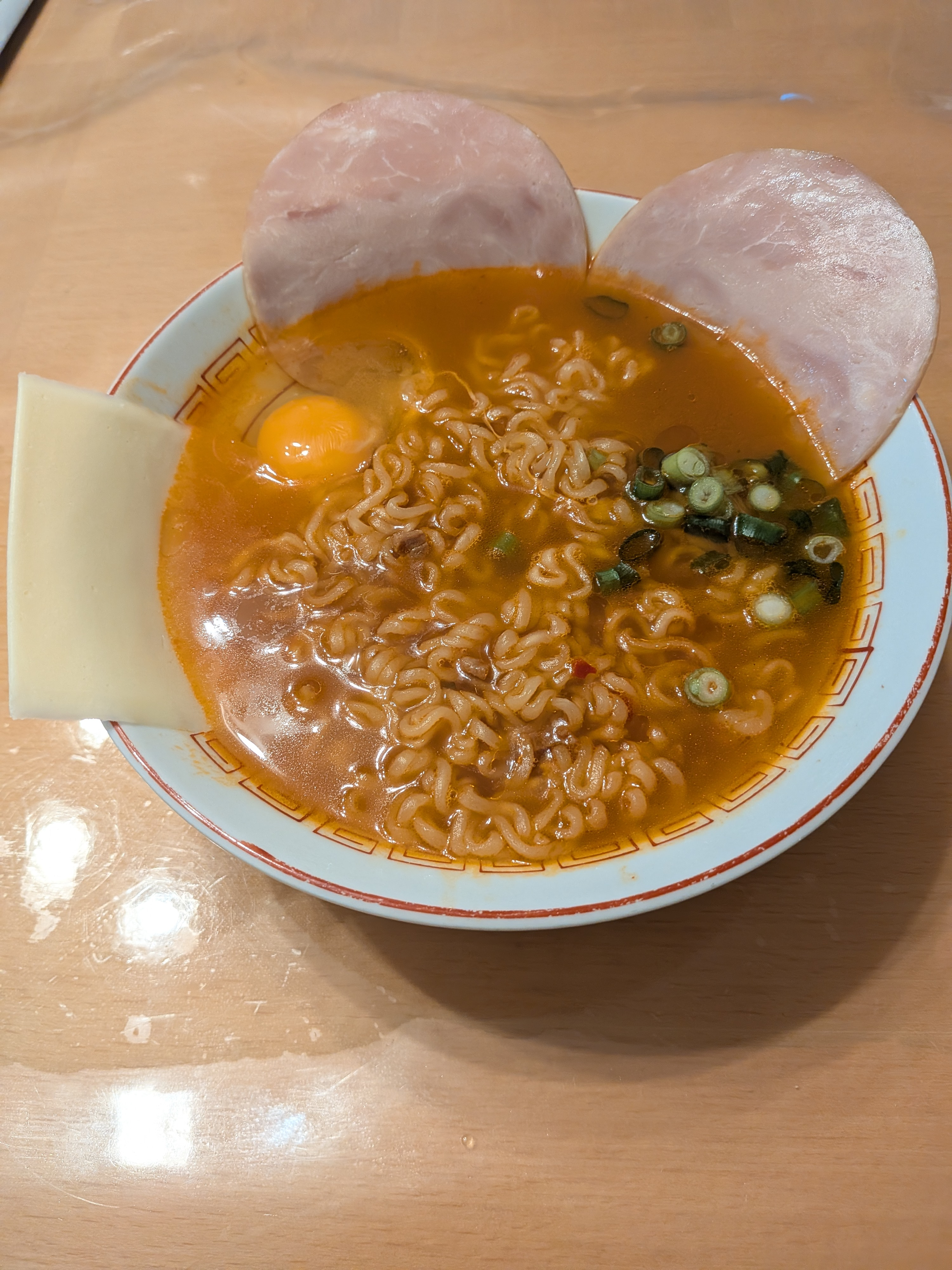
- Alternative names: Shin Ramen
- Type: Noodle
- Place of origin: South Korea
- Created by: Nongshim
- Invented: October 1, 1986
- Main ingredients: precooked noodle, seasoning

Korean name
- Hangul: 신라면
- Hanja: 辛라면
- RR: Sin ramyeon
- MR: Sin ramyŏn

Shin Ramyun (Korean: 신라면; Hanja: 辛라면) is a brand of instant noodle (including cup ramyeon) that has been produced by the South Korean food company Nongshim since October 1, 1986. It is now exported to over 100 countries, and is the best-selling instant noodle brand in South Korea.

Shin Ramyun, well known for its spicy flavor, is produced in multiple varieties, including: the original Shin Ramyun and Shin Ramyun Black, which was introduced in 2011 as well as Super Spicy, which was released in 2019, and a shrimp flavor that is only available in China and Singapore. A standard package of Shin Ramyun consists of noodles, a packet of flavoring powder (soup base), and a packet of vegetable flakes. Shin Ramyun Black contains an extra packet of beef soup stock, which gives the soup a more intensely savory flavor. Additionally, an extra-spicy variant, Shin Red, was introduced in 2020.

== History ==
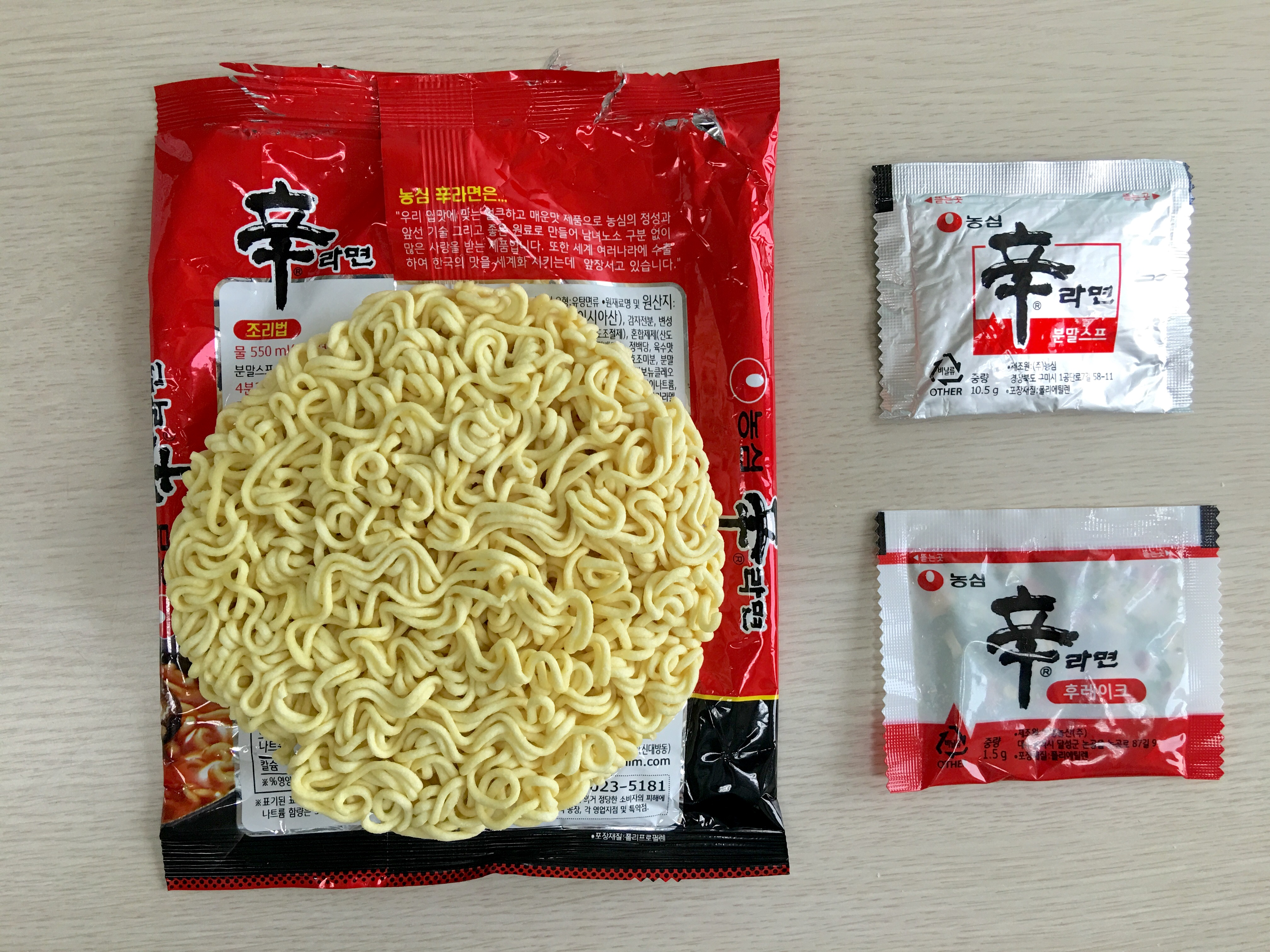
Composition of Korean Shin Ramyun

Shin Ramyun was introduced in October 1986 by Nongshim. The Nongshim R&D team was inspired by sogogi jangguk, a popular Korean spicy cabbage and beef stew.

After Shin Ramyun was introduced, Nongshim's share of the instant noodle market hit 46.3% in 1987, and exceeded 50% for the first time in 1988 (53.8%). With the market share of over 20% just by itself, Shin Ramyun is a leading brand of the instant noodles in Korea.

In 2007, Nongshim launched a kimchi-flavoured version of Shin Ramyun.

In August 2014, Nongshim revised its recipe for noodle blocks across its line for a chewier consistency, along with a revamped external packaging.

In 2015, Shin Ramyun achieved 28 billion units sold since it was first introduced. Shin Ramyun is listed on the National Brand Consumption Index (NBCI) as the number 1 brand in South Korea (2012–2016) for its brand awareness and brand power.

In 2019, Nongshim launched a non-fried version of its packet noodle which has almost half a reduction on calories.

In 2023, Shin Gold (chicken flavor) and Shin Green (tofu and mushroom flavor) were introduced in the U.S.

=== Name and package ===
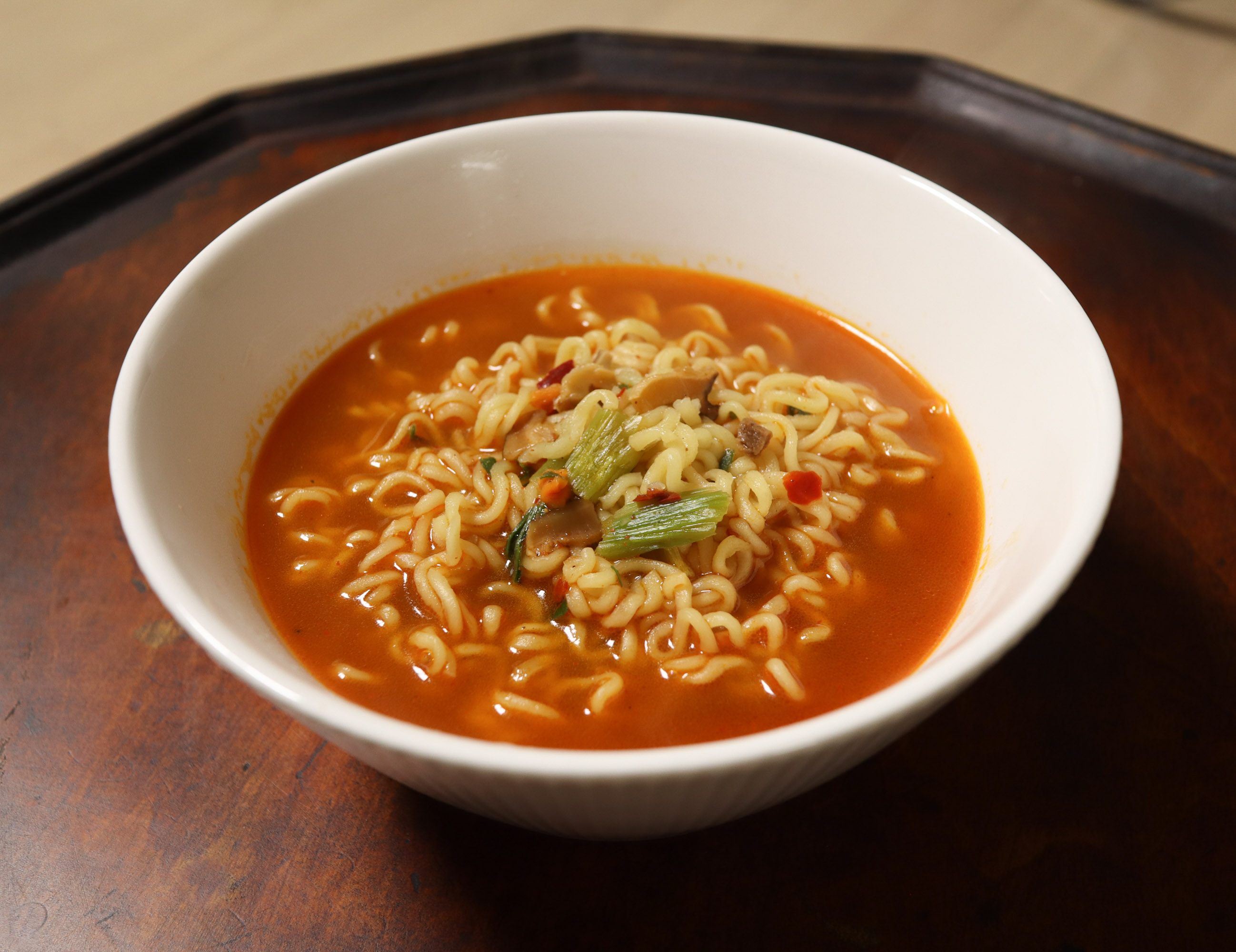
Cooked Shin Ramyun

"Shin Ramyun" is the English transliteration of the Korean words for "spicy instant noodles". Shin Ramyun uses red and black packaging with the emphasized calligraphic form of the Hanja character "辛", which means "spicy". Additionally, the character is the surname of both the founder of Nongshim, Shin Choon-ho, and his elder brother, Shin Kyuk-ho, who started Lotte.

== Products ==
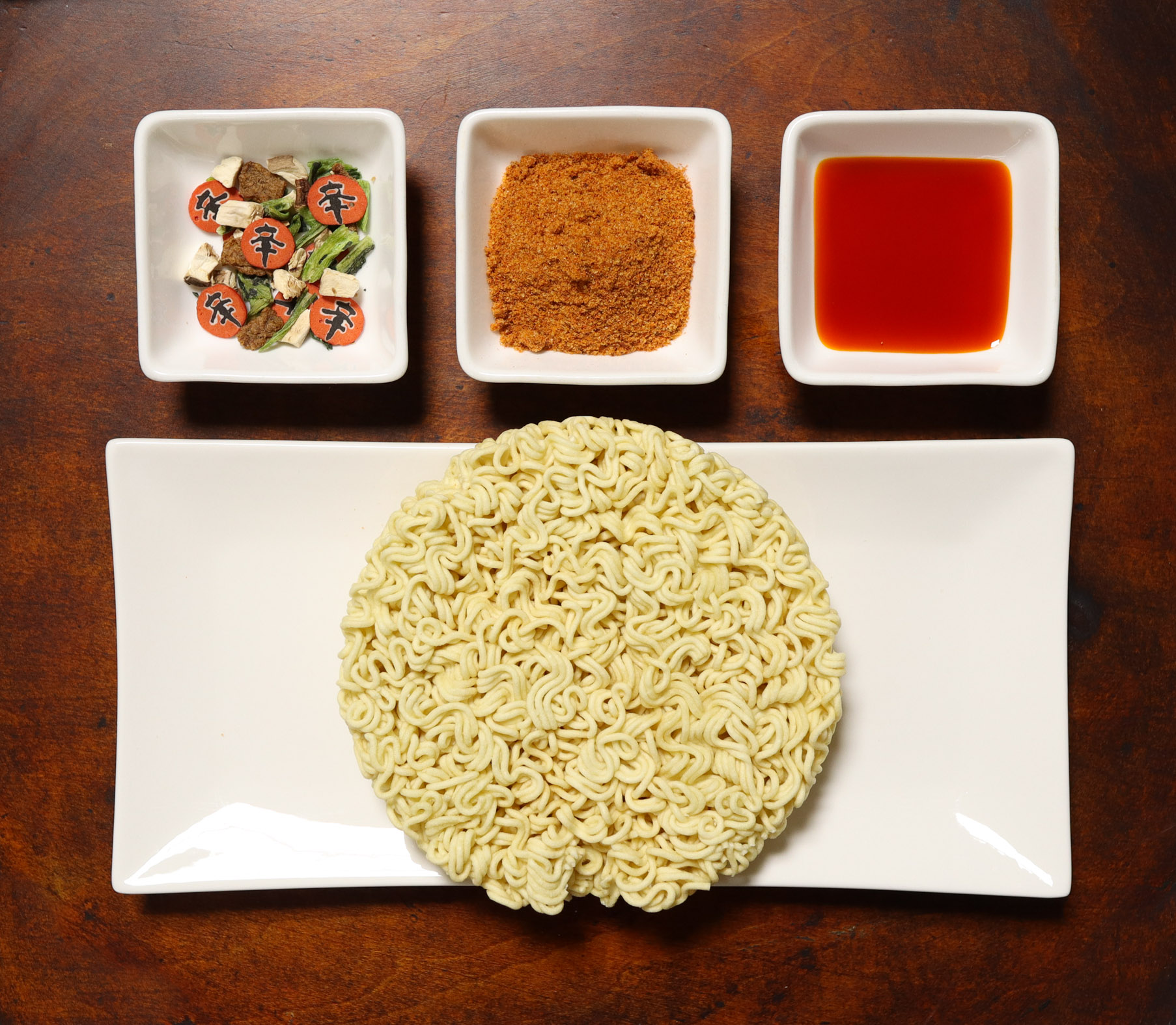
Contents of a Shin Ramyun package: Noodles, dried vegetables, spices, and oil

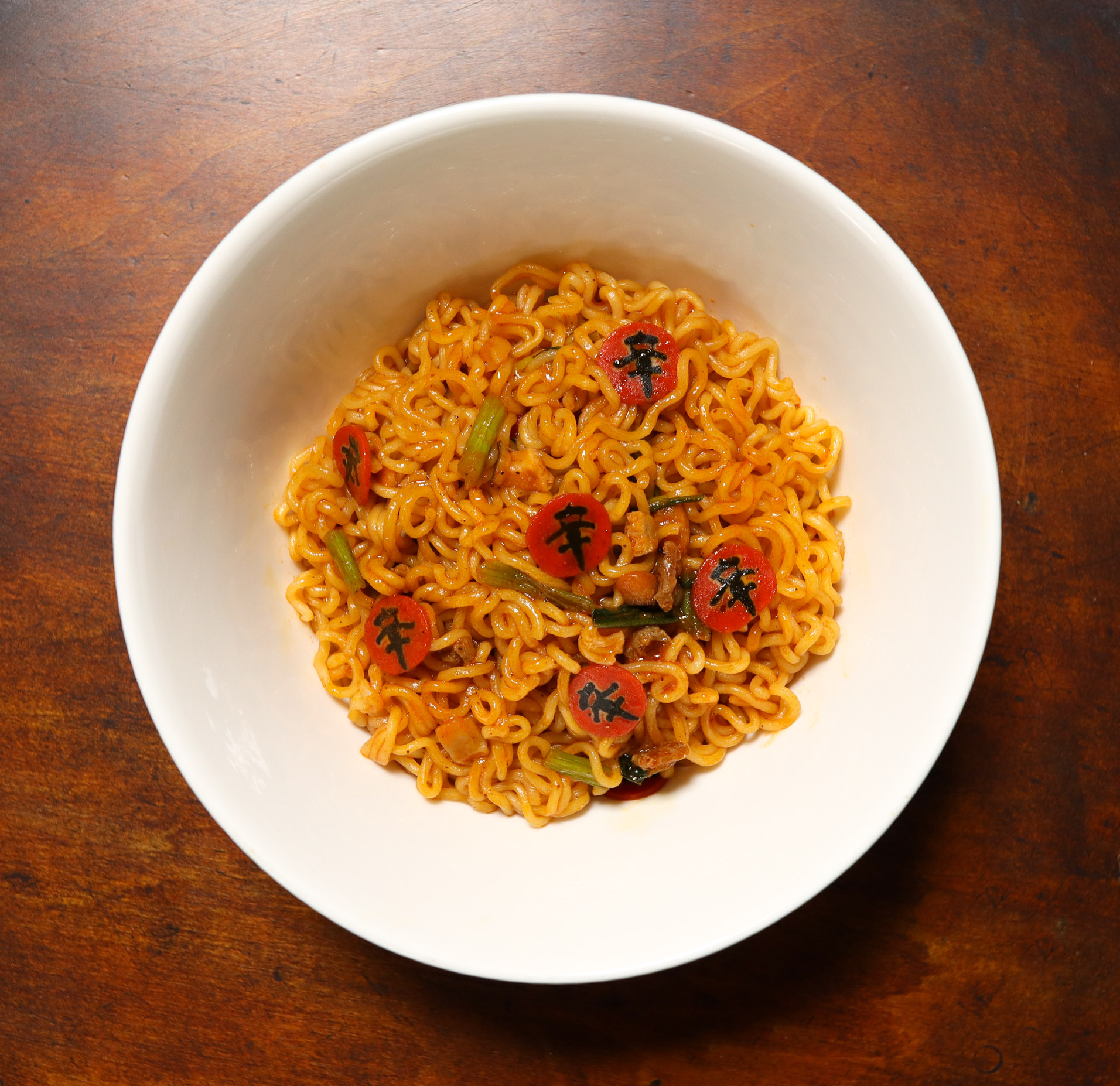
Cooked Shin Ramyun. The hanja pieces are fish cakes with the character 辛 (shin)

Shin Ramyun was first introduced in 1986. There are two types of Shin Ramyun in the U.S., one is packaged and the other cup noodle. A package of Shin Ramyun is 120g, and there are 4 sizes of Shin Ramyun cup/bowls: Shin Cup Noodle Soup (68g), Shin Bowl Noodle Soup (86g), Shin Ramyun M-Cup (75g) and Shin Big Bowl Noodle Soup (114g). In Japan, there is the Shin Ramyun Mini Cup.

=== Other flavours ===
Shin Ramyun Black was introduced in April 2011, which was 25 years after Shin Ramyun was first introduced to the market. Shin Ramyun Black is a slightly different version of Shin Ramyun with an additional seolleongtang powder on top of its flavor. Other ingredients include boiled beef slices, garlic and shiitake mushrooms. In the U.S. there are two types of Shin Ramyun Black: a Package type (130g) and a cup/bowl type (Shin Black Cup Noodle, 101g). There is also a Shin Black M-Cup (75g).

Shin Ramyun Red "Super Spicy" was launched in late 2019, in both standard packet form and the smaller instant cup size, using the same noodle blocks and vegetable packet but a much spicier soup base.

A shrimp flavor is also available in China.

== International distribution ==
Shin Ramyun is the most popular instant noodle brand to date in South Korea. It is now accounting for one quarter of the Korean instant noodle market. Shin Ramyun is now exported to over 100 countries around the world, and is produced in three countries: the United States, China and South Korea. As of 2015, accumulated sold units of Shin Ramyun in the world reached 28 billion units.

== Marketing and advertising ==
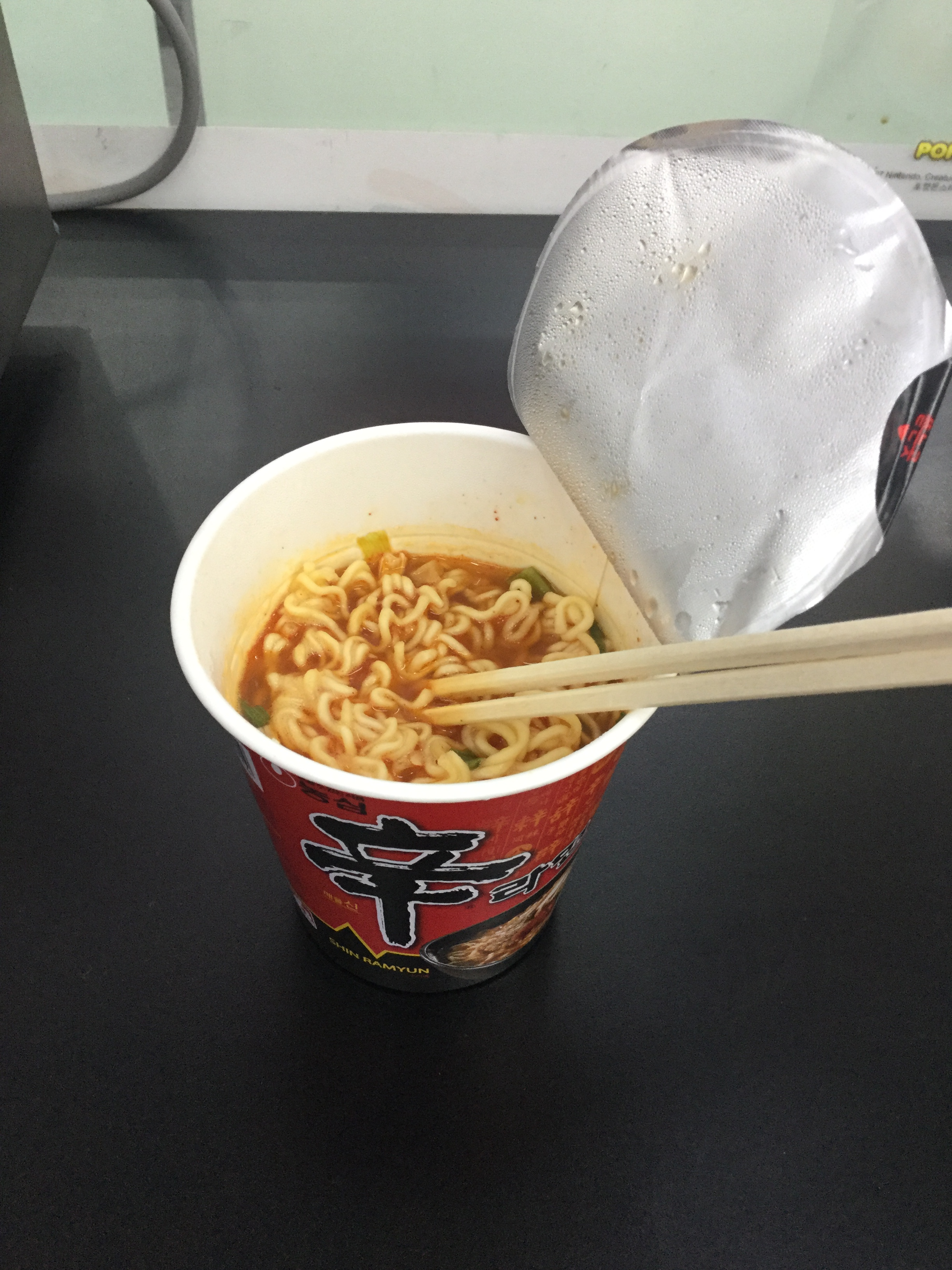
Shin Ramyun cup noodles

=== In South Korea ===
As part of the marketing strategies, Nongshim uses "사나이 울리는 신라면" (romanization: Sanai Ullineun Shin Ramyun; translation: "Shin Ramyun can make a man cry"). The word sanai (사나이) is used to describe the man while emphasizing the masculinity.

Most of its commercials include a famous male celebrity, frequently with his family, who is eating Shin Ramyun at home. These commercials emphasize being family friendly, being Korean, and folksiness. Psy, a South Korean singer who is well known for his song "Gangnam Style," and Park Ji-Sung and Son Heung-min, South Korean footballers, also filmed Shin Ramyun commercials.

Nongshim has many jingles for their products. Adding jingles at the end of their commercials is one of Nongshim's most used marketing strategies. Most people in South Korea are aware of them.

=== In China ===
In China, Nongshim uses a slogan: 사나이라면 매운맛을 먹을 줄 알아야지 (Simplified Chinese: 吃不了辣味非好汉; Translation: He who cannot handle spice is not a true man). This slogan is from a famous phrase in China "不到长城非好汉 (He who has never been to the Great Wall is not a true man)" by Mao Zedong.

Being aware of the historical importance of the board game baduk (popularly known as "go") in China, Nongshim has been sponsoring an annual Baduk Championship, the Nongshim Cup, as part of their marketing strategies since 1999.

=== In Japan ===
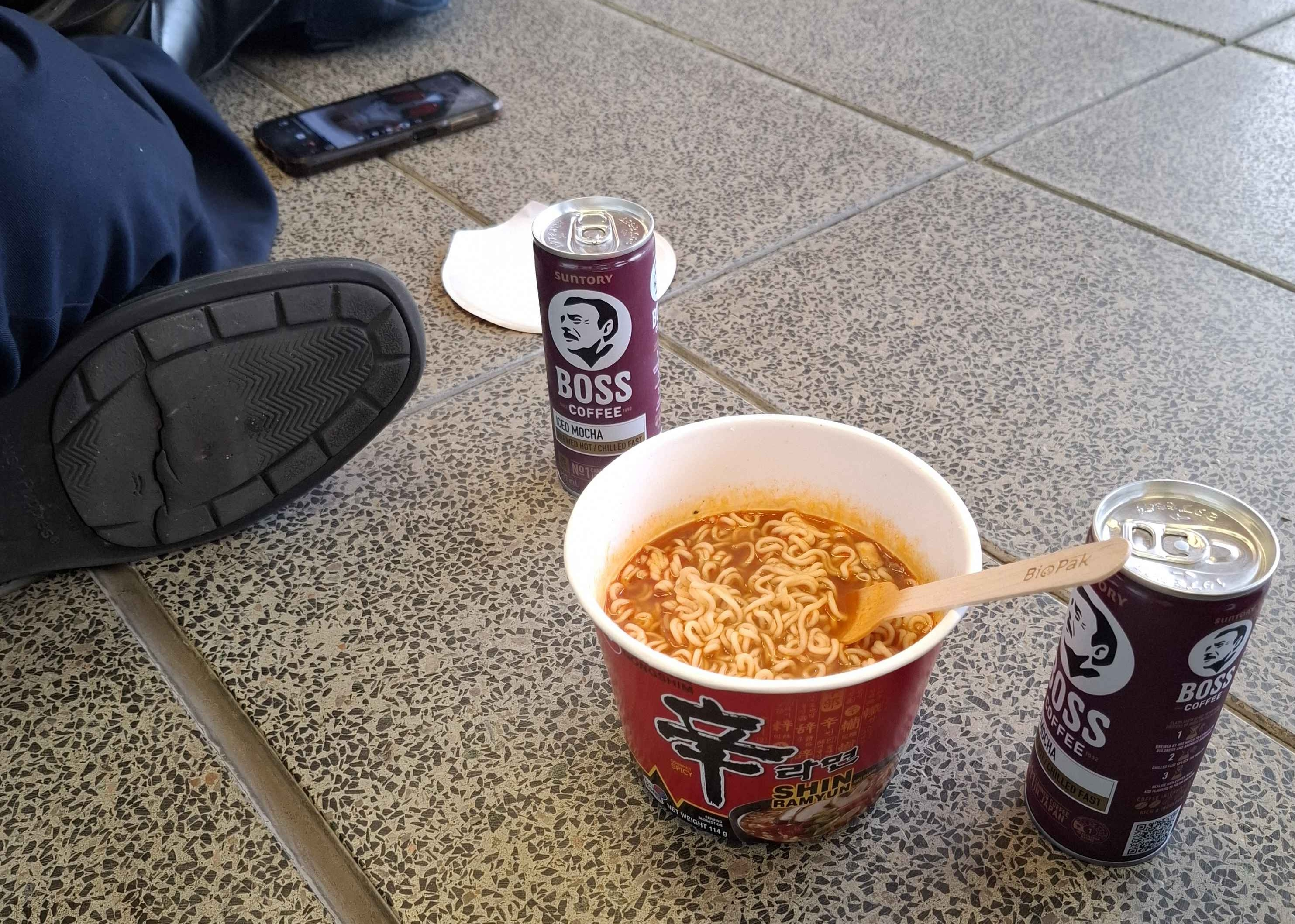
Shin Ramyun, paired with the Japanese iced coffee brand, Suntory Boss

In Japan, Nongshim has set 10 April as a Shin Ramyun day since 2010. The date was chosen for its similarity in pronunciation with "Hot" (Japanese: ホット) when the Japanese pronunciation of the number 4 in English is combined with the Japanese word for 10.

The Japanese word umakara (lit. 'spicy yet tasty') has been used to describe the flavor of Shin Ramyun.

As part of the main marketing projects, Nongshim offers "Shin Ramyun Kitchen Car", a food truck that offers consumers a chance to taste Shin Ramyun, since 2013. Every year, the truck travels across Japan for seven months, promoting Shin Ramyun to Japanese consumers. As of April 2016, the truck has hosted a total of 150 tasting sessions, and travelled more than 100,000 kilometers.

== See also ==
- List of instant noodle brands
- Noodle soup
