= Nongshim =

South Korean food and beverage company

Nongshim Co., Ltd.

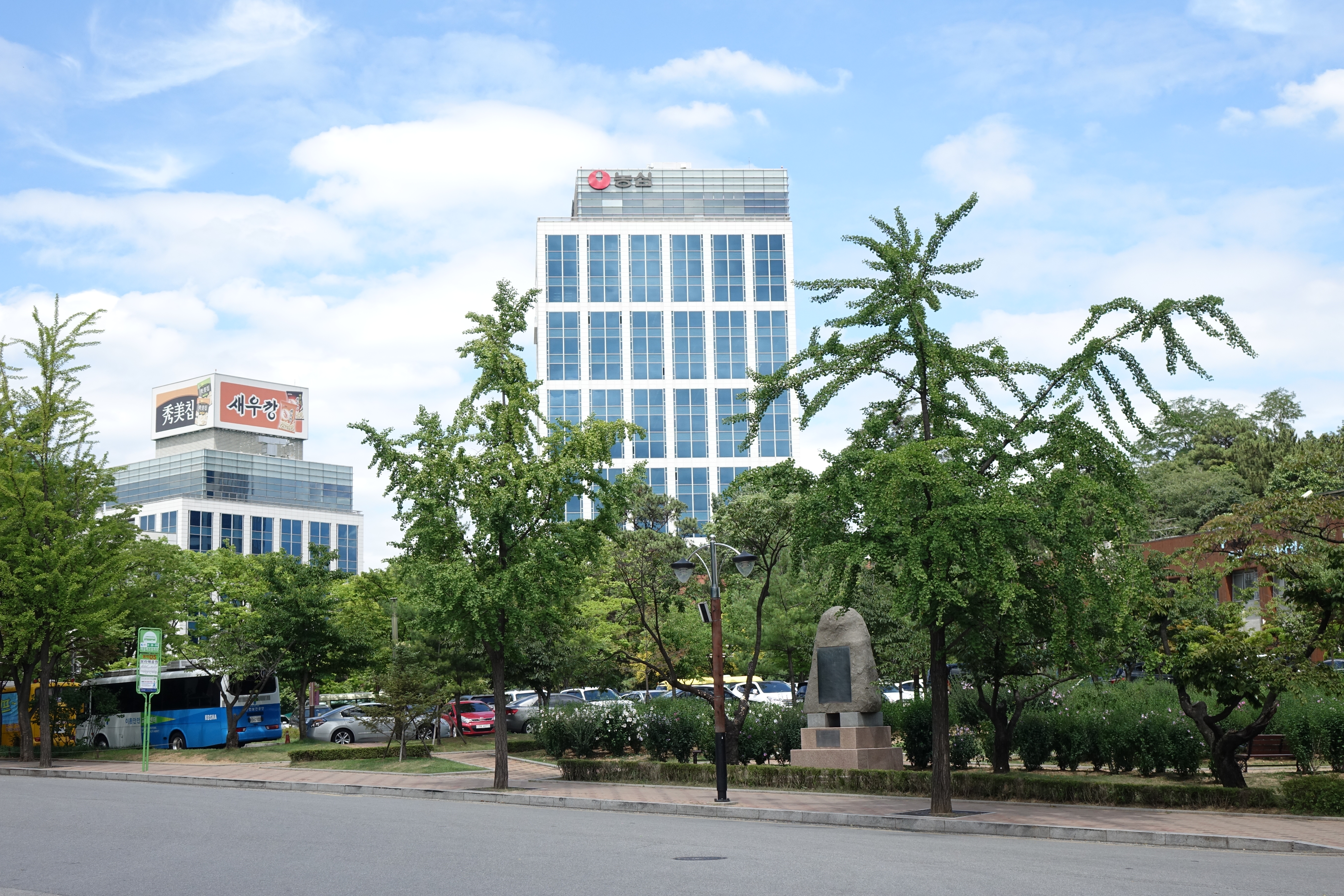
- Nongshim Headquarters in Seoul
- Native name: 농심
- Formerly: Lotte Food Industrial Company (1965–1978)
- Type: Public
- Traded as: KRX: 004370
- Industry: Food processing
- Founded: 18 September 1965; 61 years ago
- Founder: Shin Choon-ho
- Headquarters: 112 Yeouidaebang-ro, Dongjak-gu, Seoul, South Korea
- Area served: Worldwide
- Key people: Shin Dong-won (Chairman and CEO)
- Products: Shin Ramyun; Shin Ramyun Black; Neoguri; Soon Noodle; Jjawang; Matchampong; Shrimp Crackers; Onion Rings; Baeksan Mountain Water
- Revenue: ▲ ₩2,181.62 billion US$1.83 billion (2015)
- Operating income: ▲ ₩118.28 billion US$99.3 million (2015)
- Net income: ▲ ₩117.33 billion US$98.5 million (2015)
- Total assets: ▲ ₩2,418.71 billion US$2.03 billion (2015)
- Total equity: ▲ ₩1,646.47 billion US$1.38 billion (2015)
- Parent: Nongshim Holdings

Korean name
- Hangul: 농심
- Hanja: 農心
- Lit.: Farmer's Heart
- RR: Nongsim
- MR: Nongsim
- Website: eng.nongshim.com

Nongshim Co., Ltd. (Korean: 주식회사 농심; RR: Jusik-hoesa Nongsim) is a South Korean multinational food and beverage company headquartered in Seoul, South Korea. Nongshim was founded in 1965 under the name Lotte Food Industrial Company. The name was changed to Nongshim in 1978.

The current logo was published in 1991, and is meant to resemble a seed. In 2003, the business switched to a holding company system and became a subsidiary of Nongshim Holdings.

Nongshim is the largest instant noodles and snack company in South Korea. At the end of 2015, Nongshim had 2.57 trillion won in assets and 2.81 trillion won in sales. It runs 11 factories worldwide, has subsidiaries in Korea and overseas, and operates in more than 100 countries. The company is currently chaired by Shin Dong-won, son of the founder Shin Choon-ho.

== History ==
=== 1965–1979 ===
On 18 September 1965, Nongshim was established under the name Lotte Food Industrial Company in Seoul, South Korea by Shin Choon-ho. Though Choon-ho was the brother of Lotte Corporation founder Shin Kyuk-ho, the two businesses were separate. When Nongshim introduced its first ramyun, Lotte Ramyun (롯데 라면) in 1965, there were 7 other companies in the market.

As a second mover in the ramyun industry, Lotte Food Industrial Company focused on research and development. Along with South Korea's first commercialized packaged snack, Beef Ramyun (소고기 라면) in 1970, Saeukkang (새우깡) in 1971, and Nongshim Ramyun (농심라면) in 1975, Nongshim achieved a 35% market share in the mid-1970s. On 6 March 1978, after a dispute with his brother, Choon-ho changed the company's name to Nongshim, meaning "farmer's heart."

=== 1980–1989 ===
During the 1980s, Nongshim invested highly on machinery, equipment, and systems. The Anseong factory was built in 1981 to specialize in powder soup, used to flavor the ramyun.

Many of Nongshim's famous ramyun products were introduced during the 1980s: Neoguri (너구리) in 1982, Ansungtangmyun (안성탕면) in 1983, Chapagetti (짜파게티) in 1984, and Shin Ramyun (신라면) in 1986. Cup and bowl-type instant noodles were also introduced during this period.

Nongshim's market share reached 40% in 1984, and became a leading company of the market in March 1985. With Shin Ramyun (1986), the most beloved instant noodle brand in South Korea, Nongshim reached 46.2% of the ramyun market share in 1987, 53.2% in 1988, and 58% in 1989.

=== 1990–present ===
On 1 January 1991, Nongshim introduced its new corporate identity (CI): Nongshim Seed. In 1990, the company's largest factory was opened in Gumi.

The Asan factory was built in April 1993, and it specializes in potato and rice snacks. In April 1994, Nongshim introduced aseptic production system for cold noodles. In 2007, The Noksan factory was built to specialize in non-frying noodles and well-being (health) products.

During the 1990s, Nongshim focused on exporting and expanded their business in the global market. In July 1997, Nongshim began sponsoring the national Baduk (Go) Championship.

Nongshim built factories in China in the late 1990s and early 2000s: Shanghai (1996), Qingdao (1998), Shenyang (2000), a second factory at Qingdao (2002), and Yanbian (2015). In the U.S., Nongshim built a factory in Los Angeles in 2005.

== All-time Executives ==
=== Chairman ===
- Shin Choon-ho (1992–2021)
- Shin Dong-won (2021–Present)

=== Executive Chairman or Chairman & CEO ===
- Son Wook (2008–2010)

=== Vice Chairman ===
- Shin Dong-won (1998–2021)
- Lee Sang-yun (2010–2011)
- Park Joon (2016–Present)

=== President & CEO ===
- Shin Choon-ho (1965–1992)
- Lee Sang-yun (1992–2008)
- Park Joon (2012–2016)

== Advertising ==
Nongshim has been carrying out marketing and advertising that focuses on the characteristics of individual products rather than on the corporate brand as a whole. Company chairman Shin Chun-ho is quoted as saying "Advertisements should not be prioritized over quality products".

== Operation ==
=== Affiliates ===
Nongshim has 10 affiliates: Nongshim Holdings, Taekyung Nongsan, Youlchon Chemistry, Mega Mart, NDS (Nongshim Data System), Nongshim Engineering, Youlchol Foundation, Hotel Nongshim, and Nongshim Development, Nongshim flour mills.

=== Global operations ===
Nongshim's headquarters is located in Seoul, South Korea. Nongshim products are now exported to over 100 countries around the world. As of 2016, Nongshim has 11 manufacturing plants around the world: Korea (Anyang, Ansung, Asan, Gumi, Busan, Noksan), United States (Rancho Cucamonga, CA), China (Shanghai, Qingdao, Shenyang, Yanbian). There are 7 sales distribution offices in 6 countries outside of South Korea: the United States, Canada, Australia, Japan, China and Vietnam.

== Logo evolution ==
Korean logo, 1991–present

== Products ==
Nongshim products include instant noodles, packaged snacks, and bottled water. There are more than 40 brands of ramyuns, produced by Nongshim, including South Korea's most popular ramyun brand, Shin Ramyun. in 2015 Nongshim introduced new noodle brands: Zha Wang (짜왕) and Mat Champong (맛짬뽕). Zha Wang is formed of a portmanteau of jjajangmyun (짜장면) and wang (왕), which means "King". Mat Champong on the other hand is a compound of the Korean noun mat (맛) meaning "taste" and champong, although export packaging for the product romanizes the name as merely "Champong" with no "mat".

They also produce other varieties of snacks including Saeukkang the first commercialized snack in South Korea and Onion Rings (양파링; Yangpa ring), which are famous for their sliced-onion-ring shape.

Since 2012, Nongshim has been producing its own bottled water called Baeksan Water (백산수; 白山水; baeksansu), which is slowly filtered by Baekdu Mountain volcanic rock.

== See also ==
- Nongshim RedForce
- Lotte Group
