= Ambrosia (food brand) =

UK brand known for custard and rice pudding

- Logo used since 2014.
- Product type: Food
- Current owner: Premier Foods
- Country: United Kingdom
- Introduced: 1917
- Markets: United Kingdom and Ireland
- Previous owners: Colman's
- Tagline: "Devon knows how they make it so creamy" "Devon knows it's unbelievably good" (Ambrosia Rice)
- Website: ambrosia.co.uk

Ambrosia is a brand of food products in the United Kingdom. Its original product was a dried milk powder for infants, but it is now mostly known for its custard and rice pudding. The brand plays on the fact that it is made in Devon, England (at a factory in Lifton), with its punning strapline "Devon knows how they make it so creamy".

== History ==
The Ambrosia Creamery was founded in 1917 by Alfred Morris, in his home village Lifton in Devon, to make rich food for infants. He took milk from local farms, where most of the cows were the Red Ruby breed, and dried it with roller dryers. The term ambrosia refers to an immortalising food of the gods in Greek classicism.

The product soon came to the attention of the British armed forces, who took significant quantities for its soldiers, still fighting in the First World War.

Just prior to the Second World War, the Ambrosia creamery was the first company to start making creamed rice pudding ready in a tin. Following the outbreak of war, the vast majority of production was placed in Red Cross food parcels.

After the end of hostilities, Ambrosia relaunched the product, along with a creamed macaroni pudding.

In 1957, following increasing demand, the creamery opened a new factory near to the original production facility.

In 1990 the entire company was acquired by Colman's Ltd., producer of a famous brand of mustard. This, in turn, was bought out by Unilever in 2001. Unilever sold the brand on in 2004, to Premier Foods, where it is still a core brand, alongside others such as Bisto, Oxo and Sharwood's.

In November 2018, Premier Foods announced that it was exploring the possible sale of the Ambrosia factory and brand in a move to focus on its growing brands, such as Batchelors and Mr Kipling, and to accelerate the rate at which it pays down its £510m debt. This sale offer was later withdrawn.

== Variations ==
Carton and can of Ambrosia Devon custard

This is a List of Ambrosia Products:

=== Custards ===
- Ambrosia Custard
- Ambrosia My Mini Custard
- Ambrosia Banana
- Ambrosia Chocolate
- Ambrosia Strawberry
- Ambrosia Light Custard
- Ambrosia Deluxe Custard
- Ambrosia Belgian Chocolate Deluxe Custard
- Ambrosia Madagascan Vanilla Deluxe Custard
- Ambrosia Plant Based Custard

=== Rice Puddings ===
- Ambrosia Rice Pudding
- Ambrosia Deluxe Rice
- Ambrosia My Mini Rice
- Ambrosia Light Rice Pudding
- Ambrosia Sticky Toffee Rice Pudding
- Ambrosia Chocolate Rice Pudding
- Ambrosia Salted Caramel Deluxe Rice
- Ambrosia Apple & Cinnamon Deluxe Rice
- Ambrosia Madagascan Vanilla Deluxe Rice
- Ambrosia Caramelised Biscuit Deluxe Rice
- Ambrosia Traditional Rice Pudding & Sultanas

=== Related products ===
- Ambrosia Ready to Eat Porridge
- Ambrosia Ice Cream
- Ambrosia Macaroni
- Ambrosia Semolina
- Ambrosia Tapioca

=== Discontinued ===
- Ambrosia Splat!
- Ambrosia Devon Dream

== Marketing ==
In the late 1990s, there were advertisements for the Ambrosia flavoured custards which featured custard splatting into the face of a man who licks it off and replies "Mmmm; strawberry/banana/chocolate flavour" and finally, the end of the theme from Roobarb can be heard.

In 1999, Ambrosia launched Ambrosia Splat! Custard, aimed at young children. As part of its marketing, it sponsored a popular Saturday-morning kids' TV show SMTV Live (coincidentally its presenters Ant and Dec were the narrators of the sponsorship idents), in 2002, Panto.ie's annual pantomime in Dublin and from 2008 to 2011, the CBBC block on BBC One.

Also, in 2000 to 2001, Ambrosia Splat! was advertised by a group of animated characters collectively known as "The Yummies" (Chucky Chocolate, Tammy Toffee, Vinnie Vanilla, Billy Banana, & Suzie Strawberry) who get splat in all sorts of different ways, depending on the situation. The campaign was narrated by Dexter Fletcher.

When the Ambrosia Rice pots were released in 2012, a variation of the strapline was used, saying "Devon knows it's unbelievably good".

In 2020, Ambrosia launched a campaign featuring a mole named Moley, in the advert, After a life spent underground, he emerges from his mole hole and grasps a yellow balloon that happens to be passing. It takes him on a journey over the Devonshire countryside. As he takes to the skies, we see him make new friends, pick a raspberry and even fly-by a picnic where some friends are enjoying the Ambrosia custard sharing pot. It’s here that he gets his very first taste of Ambrosia, before landing to enjoy the deliciously creamy delight nearby.
