= Cerebos =

Brand of salt

- Type: Subsidiary
- Industry: Processed foods
- Founder: Mawson & Swan
- Headquarters: Greatham
- Area served: Worldwide
- Products: Sauces; Food Flavourings; Nutritional Supplements
- Owner: Kraft Heinz (Asia Pacific); Premier Foods (UK); K+S (Western Europe); Bud Group (South Africa)
- Website: www.cerebos.fr www.cerebos.co.za

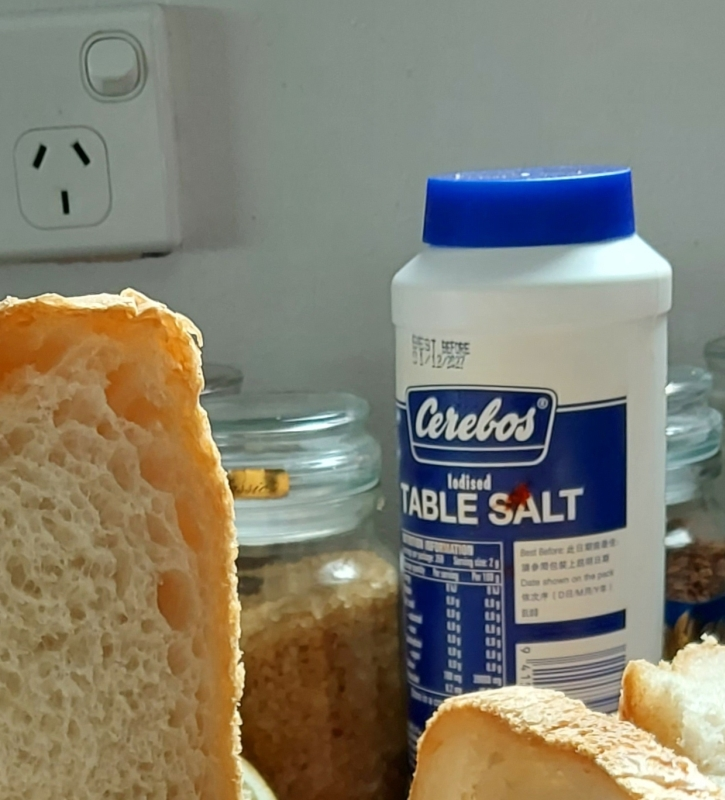
Table salt, in NZ

Cerebos is a brand of salt and, more recently, of other flavourings and nutritional supplements. Ownership of the Cerebos brand is divided between Kraft Heinz in Asia Pacific, Australia and New Zealand, Premier Foods in UK, K+S in Western Europe, and Bud Group in South Africa. The product was developed by George Weddell, a Scottish chemist working at the British company Mawson & Swan, and sold under the Cerebos brand by a new partnership, Mawson, Swan & Weddell.

The company Cerebos Ltd was later registered in 1894. At the time of its introduction, salt was sold in large blocks from which the user would scrape what they needed. Free-running salt was a novelty because, left for any length of time, pure sodium chloride crystals would absorb sufficient moisture from the air to cause them to stick together, a phenomenon called caking. Its slogan was "See How It Runs", because the salt contained anti-caking agents. The slogan was echoed in the product branding of a small boy chasing a chicken, a reference to the superstition that birds might be caught by pouring salt onto their tail.

Ernest Shackleton lists Cerebos salt among the few precious stocks taken in the James Caird on his trip with five men from Elephant Island to South Georgia as he attempted to engineer a daring escape from the Antarctic.

From 1923 until the mid 1900s, Cerebos Ltd had a factory at the then 10 Victoria Road, in North Acton, northwest London, UK. The company was purchased by Rank Hovis McDougall (RHM) in 1968, and the site was redeveloped into the 'Shaftesbury Gardens' housing development in the mid 1990's.

Cerebos salt is sold in Western Europe (including France where it is spelt Cérébos), Australia, New Zealand and South Africa. The Australian and New Zealand operations were part of Cerebos Pacific, and now owned by Kraft Heinz which acquired most of its assets from Suntory Holdings in 2018, and includes the well known local brands:

- Greggs (NZ)
- Robert Harris (NZ)
- Bisto (NZ)
- Raro (NZ)
- atomic (NZ)
- Whitlock's (NZ)
- L'affare (NZ)
- Bruno Rossi (NZ)
- Gravox (Australia)
- Fountain (Australia)
- Toby Estate (Australia)
- Saxa (Australia)
- Foster Clark's (Australia)
- Mocopan (Australia)
- Asian Home Gourmet (Australia)

== Branding ==
A boy chasing a chicken and pouring salt over it is an icon that has become synonymous with the brand.

The Cerebos salt company invented 'Bisto' gravy powder product (a mixture of salt, flavourings and colourings), at its salt factory in Middlewich, Cheshire in the United Kingdom. It was acquired by RHM in 1968, which later sold its stake in Cerebos South Africa in the 1980s and Cerebos Pacific to Suntory in 1990.
