= Saxa =

Saxa may refer to:

- Saxa (food product), a brand of salt and pepper
- Saxa (musician) (Lionel Augustus Martin, 1930–2017), saxophonist
