= Cerebos Pacific =

Singaporean food product company

Cerebos Pacific Limited
- Industry: Food products
- Founded: 1981
- Defunct: 2018
- Fate: Most assets acquired by Kraft Heinz; Health supplements division was moved to Suntory Beverage & Food Asia Pte. Ltd.
- Headquarters: Singapore
- Area served: Asia-Pacific

Cerebos Pacific Limited (CPL) was a company that sold health supplements, food and coffee products across the Asia-Pacific region. In 2018, Kraft Heinz acquired Cerebos from Japan's Suntory Holdings.

== History ==
Cerebos Pacific Limited traces its name back to 1892, when George Weddell decided to mix calcium phosphate with salt and invented dry-pouring salt. The brand name 'Cerebos' was derived from 'Ceres' for the Roman goddess of wheat harvest, and 'os' from the French word for 'bone.'

Cerebos subsequently grew to include a wide range of food products. It acquired Brand & Company in 1959 and later acquired Rank Hovis McDougall (RHM) in 1968.

In 1981, Cerebos Pacific Limited was formed, and in 1982 it acquired all RHM subsidiaries in the Asia-Pacific region. Suntory Holdings later purchased RHM shares in Cerebos Pacific Limited in 1990. In 2012, Cerebos was delisted from SGX and became a wholly owned subsidiary of Suntory until 2018, when its food and coffee division (including the Cerebos brand name in the Asia-Pacific region) was acquired by the Kraft Heinz Company. Suntory subsequently moved the health supplements division (now under Brand's brand name) to Suntory Beverage & Food Asia Pte. Ltd., and CPL was deregistered from the company register of Singapore.

=== Beginnings (1820s - 1920s) ===
Year	History
1820s	The poor health of King George IV inspired a royal chef, Mr. Henderson William Brand, to develop an essence of chicken beverage to boost His Majesty's condition.
1835	Mr. Brand commercialised Brand's Essence of Chicken after his retirement.
1873	Mrs. Brand passes the business to J J Mason who is joined in partnership by Mr. Thomas Dence.
1887	A new factory is built at 72-84 South Lambeth Road, Vauxhall, [London].
1894	Cerebos Ltd (UK) is registered.
1897	Brand & Co Ltd is registered.
1900s	Brand's fame spreads throughout the British Empire.
1920s	Brand's Essence of Chicken arrives in Asia.
1925	Gregg's operations are consolidated and established at Forth Street, Dunedin, where it continues to operate today.

=== Eastward expansion (1948 - 1967) ===
Year	History
1948	Formation of Dominion Salt Limited in New Zealand (Salt Refining).
1953	Formation of Cerebos (Australia) Ltd.
1958	Formation of Cerebos (New Zealand) Ltd.
1959	Brand & Co Ltd, UK is acquired by Cerebos Ltd, UK.
1960	Formation of Cerebos (Malaysia) Sdn Bhd.
1964	Gregg's Ltd. was formed to become the holding company of W Gregg's & Co and Island Food's Ltd.
1967	Whittome Stevenson's name is changed to Cerebos Foods (New Zealand) Ltd.

=== Consolidation and growth (1968 - 1997) ===
Year	History
1968	Formation of Cerebos (Singapore) Pte Ltd.
	Cerebos Ltd, UK is acquired by Ranks Hovis McDougall PLC.
1969	Formation of Cerebos-Skellerup Ltd.
1973	Dominion Salt (NI), establishes solar and vacuum salt refineries at Mt Manganui, New Zealand.
1974	Formation of Cerebos (Thailand) Ltd.
	Formation of Cerebos (Taiwan) Ltd.
1978	Formation of Yakult (Singapore) Pte Ltd [Joint Venture with Yakult Honsha Ltd, Japan].
1981	Formation of Cerebos Pacific Limited in Singapore.
1982	Cerebos Pacific Limited acquires Ranks Hovis McDougall PLC subsidiaries in the Far East, Australia and New Zealand.
	Formation of Cerebos Eastern (Singapore) Pte Ltd.
1983	Cerebos Pacific Limited is listed on the Stock Exchange of Singapore.
	Cerebos Eastern (Singapore) Pte Ltd becomes a wholly owned subsidiary of Cerebos Pacific Limited.
1984	Merger of Gregg's Ltd with Cerebos (New Zealand) Ltd and formation of Cerebos Gregg's Ltd (New Zealand).
	Cerebos Gregg's is listed on the New Zealand Stock Exchange.
1985	Acquisition of Menu Master Pty Ltd.
1990	Cerebos Pacific Limited is acquired by Suntory Holdings Limited.
	Suntory purchases Ranks Hovis McDougall PLC's share in Cerebos Pacific Ltd.
	Cerebos acquires Robert Harris Tea & Coffee (New Zealand).
1991	Cerebos acquires Keri Juices Ltd.
1992	Cerebos acquires F Whitlock and Son Ltd.
	Cerebos acquires Pizza Hut Singapore Pte Ltd.
1994	High Tech Foods (Guangzhou) Ltd was formed in The People's Republic of China.
1995	Cerebos acquires Woh Hup Food Industries Pte Ltd.
1996	Cerebos acquires Horleys Health.
	Divestment of Pizza Hut Singapore Pte Ltd.
1997	Cerebos acquires Asian Home Gourmet.
	Cerebos acquires Rio Beverages Ltd.

=== Growth and Kraft Heinz acquisition (1998 - 2018) ===
Year	History
1998	Cerebos enters a joint venture with Rio Beverages Ltd. of New Zealand.
2002	High Tech Foods (Guangzhou) Ltd is renamed Cerebos (Guangzhou) Limited.
	Incorporation of PT Cerebos Indonesia.
	Completion of sale of Rio Beverages Limited.
	Incorporation of Soberec (Thailand) Limited.
	Change of name from Cerebos Ingredients Pty Ltd to Riva Coffee Co Pty Ltd.
2003	Brand's Museum opens in Thailand.
	Sale of Yakult Singapore Pte Ltd.
	Brand's Health Museum is set up in Taiwan.
2004	Cerebos divests four non-core brands in Australia: – Menu Master, Ocean Supreme, Garden Supreme and Regal Sea.
2005	Acquisition of Atomic Coffee Roasters Ltd in New Zealand.
2007	Incorporation of Brand's (1835) Limited in Thailand.
	Cerebos acquires Amcor Closures Asia Pacific in Philippines, later renamed as CPL Packaging Inc.
2009	Cerebos Australia announces its joint venture with Toby's Estate.
	Cerebos launches Espresso Mechanics.
2010	Launch of Brand's Brain Research Centre in Singapore.
	Launch of Brand's manufacturing facility at Pinthong Industrial Estate in Thailand.
	Divestment of Brand's Japan Limited.
	Official opening of the new roasting facility for Mocopan Coffee at [Victoria], Australia.
2011	Toby's Estate opens its first café in Singapore.
2012	Opening of new laboratory and research centre at Biopolis, Singapore.
	Cerebos Pacific Limited is delisted from the Singapore Stock Exchange and is a wholly owned subsidiary of Suntory Holdings Limited.
2013	Voluntary dissolution of Cerebos (Guangzhou) Ltd.
2018	Kraft Heinz acquires most of Cerebos Pacific Limited assets from Suntory Holdings Limited. Company deregistered from the company register of Singapore.

== Divisions ==
=== Health Supplement Division ===
In Asia, the Health Supplement Division managed Brand's liquid and tablet product ranges for consumers’ health and wellness needs. Other Brain-to-Body Wellness brands include Xu Pei and Hua Tuo. Skin and Beauty Wellness brands. Each of these brands had a wide range of products targeted at different segments. This division was not included in the Kraft Heinz acquisition and instead moved by Suntory to Suntory Beverage & Food Asia Pte. Ltd..

=== Food & Coffee Division ===
In Australasia, Cerebos was a sauce, spice and coffee manufacturing organization. Based in Australia, the Food & Coffee Division products included gravies, sauces, pickles, herbs and spices, salt, pepper, food mixes, desserts and toppings, drinks and coffee marketed under brand names including Gravox, Fountain, Saxa and Gregg's.

Cerebos’ coffee products include a variety of fresh coffee and instant coffees, sold under brand names such as Robert Harris, Mocopan, Toby's Estate, Caffe L’affare and Gregg's. Kraft Heinz acquired the instant coffee division and Suntory retained the fresh coffee division which became Suntory Coffee Australia.

== See also ==
- Gregg's
- SAXA
- Yeo Hiap Seng
