= Smash (instant mashed potato) =

UK brand of instant mashed potatoes

- Product type: Instant mashed potato
- Current owner: Premier Foods
- Produced by: Batchelors
- Country: United Kingdom
- Introduced: 1960s
- Markets: United Kingdom
- Previous owners: Cadbury
- Registered as a trademark in: United Kingdom (1973)
- Tagline: "For Mash Get Smash"

Smash is a brand of instant mashed potato in the United Kingdom. It was launched in the 1960s by Cadbury, which was primarily a manufacturer of confectionery at the time. Smash was reasonably successful.

However, it was not until 1974 that Smash became popular in the convenience food market after Cadbury launched an advertising campaign by agency Boase Massimi Pollitt featuring the Smash Martians, who would watch humans preparing mashed potato the traditional way on television instead of using potato granules, and laugh at them.

The adverts of 1970s and their catchphrase "For Mash get Smash" were voted television advert of the century by Campaign magazine, and second-best television advert of all time in a poll of April 2000 conducted by The Sunday Times and Channel 4, beaten by Guinness's Surfer advertisement from 1999.

The brand has since been sold by Cadbury and is now owned by Premier Foods which, using its Batchelors brand, launched a 'healthier recipe' version in 2006.

== TV advertisements ==
The original 1970s advertisements have been featured in several "best ever television advertisements" lists.

Creator	Country	Accolade	Year	Rank	Source
Channel 4/The Sunday Times	United Kingdom	The 100 Greatest TV Adverts	2000	#2	
ITV	United Kingdom	ITV's Best Ever Ads (Top 20 List)	2005	#1	
