= Beef tea =

Beef tea may refer to

- Bovril
- Oxo (food)
- Broth
