= Loyd Grossman sauces =

Brand of cooking sauces

Loyd Grossman tomato and chilli pasta sauce

Loyd Grossman Food is a brand of cooking sauces established in 1995 manufactured by Premier Foods in association with TV personality and food critic Loyd Grossman. As of 2012 Premier Foods, which also manufactures Sharwood's, was the leading UK cooking sauces company in terms of value share.

The company produces Italian, Indian, Thai, Vietnamese and Chilli Cooking Sauces and introduced a For One range in 2010, which is sold in individual pouches containing enough sauce for one helping.

In 2011 Premier Foods issued a product recall on Loyd Grossman korma after cases of botulism in Scotland. A Health Protection Scotland report on the incident concluded that the Premier Foods factory was unlikely to be the source and speculated that the jar in question might have become contaminated after leaving the factory.
