= Paxos (disambiguation) =

Paxos or Paxi is a Greek island in the Ionian sea.

Paxos may also refer to:

- Paxos (computer science), a family of algorithms
- Paxos Trust Company, an American financial institution and technology company

== See also ==
- Paxo
