= Gregg's (New Zealand) =

New Zealand food and beverage company

Cerebos Gregg's Limited
- Type: Private
- Industry: Food and beverages
- Predecessor: W Gregg & Co. Limited
- Founded: 1861, Otago
- Founder: William Gregg
- Headquarters: Auckland, New Zealand
- Number of locations: Auckland, Wellington, Christchurch and Dunedin
- Owner: Kraft Heinz
- Number of employees: 300
- Parent: Heinz Watties Limited
- Website: cerebos.co.nz

Cerebos Gregg's is a New Zealand food and beverage company, best known for their coffee, desserts, and condiments. The company has been in operation since 1861, making it one of New Zealand's oldest food companies. The company is now run as part of Heinz Watties Limited, a subsidiary of Kraft Heinz.

The company employs over 200 people in its two factories. The Dunedin North factory has operated on the same site since 1925; the East Tāmaki site in Auckland was opened in 1972 and now contains the current head office.

== History ==
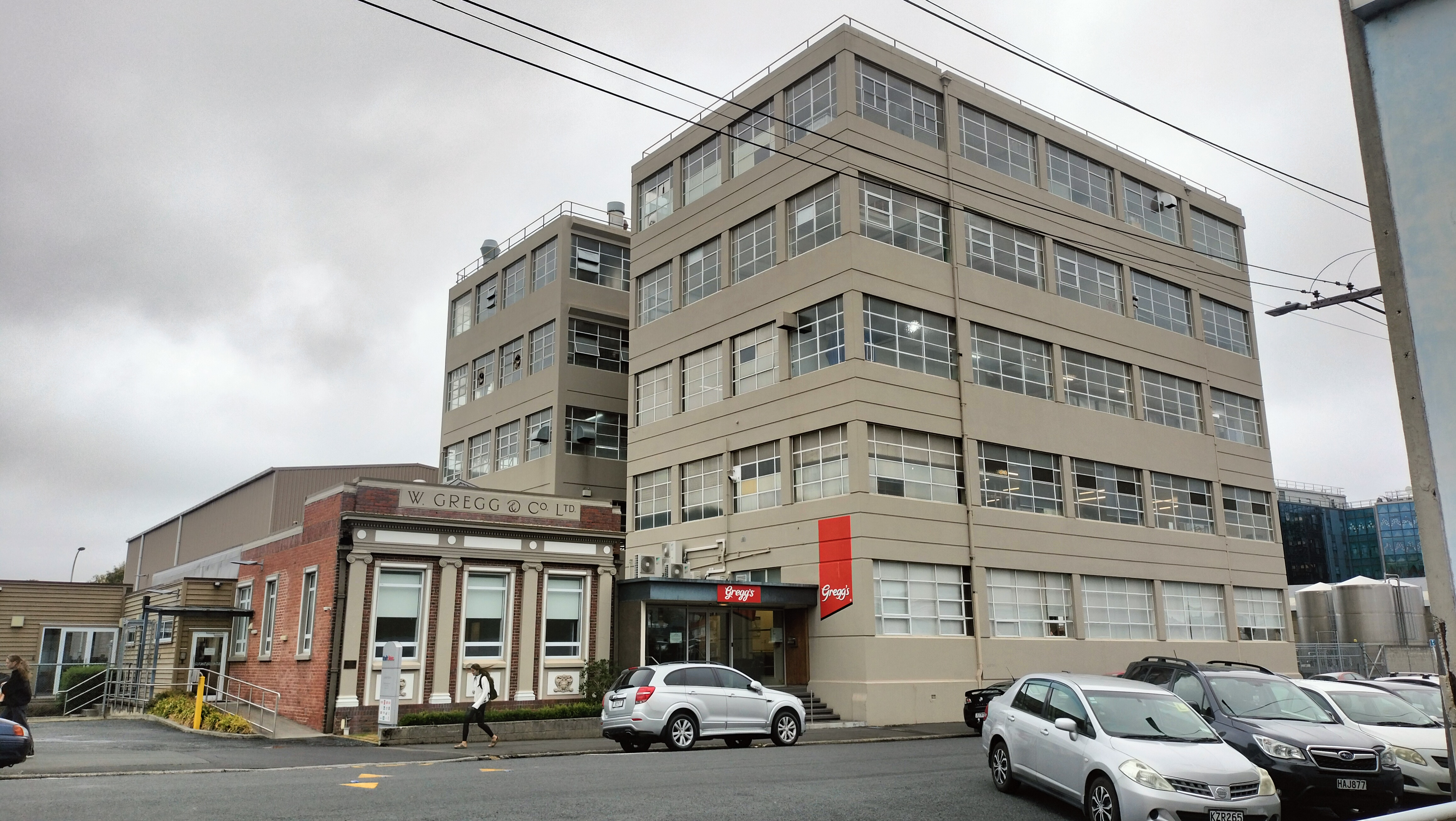
Gregg's coffee factory on 51 Forth Street, Dunedin North

Company founder William Gregg emigrated from Northern Ireland to Australia's Ballarat gold fields during the 1850s, and from there moved to Dunedin at the time of the Otago gold rush. There he established W Gregg & Co, with wide-ranging food interests, but most notably a coffee and spice merchants. Gregg's became a limited liability company the 1920s, and in 1925 all the Gregg's operations were combined in one enterprise in Forth Street, Dunedin North (a site which still houses the company's coffee processing operations).

During the 1930s to 1950s, a range of other products were launched, including salad dressings and instant puddings. Gregg's also launched their first instant coffee in the 1950s, the first such product to be made in New Zealand. In 1991 Gregg's launched granulated coffee, under the brand name of Red Ribbon Roast. Decaffeinated instant coffee was launched the following year.

A 1970 advertisement for Gregg's coffee was the first multicultural television advertisement broadcast in New Zealand, and in 1974, a short clip from UK progressive rock band Pink Floyd's song The Great Gig in the Sky (featuring Clare Torry) was used on another television commercial.

In 1984, the New Zealand arm of international food company Cerebos merged with Gregg's to form Cerebos Gregg's Limited. In 1990, the company added the Robert Harris coffee brand to their company, and in 2005, Atomic Coffee Roasters was also purchased by the company.

In 2018, Kraft Heinz acquired most of Cerebos Pacific's food and coffee division, including Cerebos Gregg's Limited from Suntory. Subsequently, Cerebos Gregg's Limited operations were consolidated into Heinz Watties Limited.

In mid-March 2026, Wattie's proposed closing down the Gregg's coffee factory as part of a downsizing of its national operations. The proposed closure would lead to the discontinuation of the Gregg's and Special Blend coffee brands. On 27 March, Wattie's confirmed that it will close Gregg's coffee factory as part of its plans to downsize its operations across New Zealand. The closure of the factory is expected to affect 50 jobs in Dunedin.
