= Pinky Lilani =

Author, speaker and women's advocate

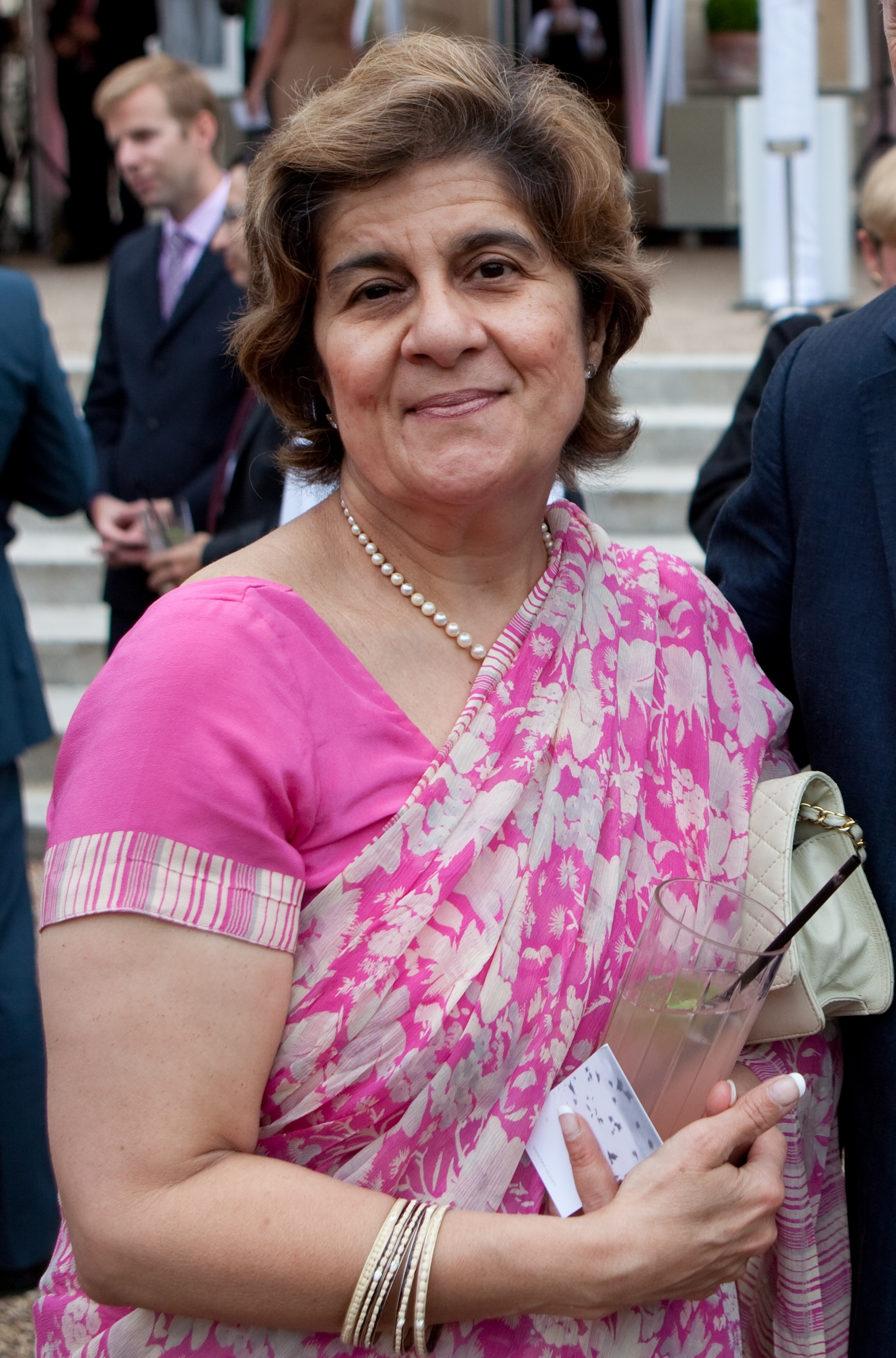
Lilani at 2011 party at the Financial Times

Nusrat Mehboob Lilani CBE DL (born 25 March 1954), known as Pinky Lilani, is an author, motivational speaker, food expert and women's advocate. She is the founder and chair of several awards recognising influential women and leaders, including the annual Women of the Future Awards and the Asian Women of Achievement Awards.

Lilani was appointed Officer of the Order of the British Empire (OBE) in 2007 for services to charity and as Commander of the Order of the British Empire (CBE) in 2015 for services to women in business.

== Early life and education ==
Lilani was born on 25 March 1954 in Calcutta, India and studied at the Catholic Loreto House School, Calcutta. She was raised in the Ismaili community. In 1974, she graduated from Calcutta University with an honours degree in Education and English. Lilani continued her studies, gaining a post graduate diploma in Social Communication Medias from the University of Bombay in 1976.

In 1978 Lilani moved to the UK.

== Career ==
Lilani began her cookery career when she moved to the UK in 1978; she compiled her notes and recipes which eventually became her first book, '’Spice Magic: An Indian Culinary Adventure’’, published in 2001 and promoted it by holding culinary demonstrations in book shops. The cookbook also surveys the influence of history, culture, geography and religion on the food habits of India. In 2009 she released a second book, '’Coriander Makes the Difference'’. Lilani has acted as a development consultant with major food companies in Europe, including Sharwood's, and has advised on Indian food products stocked by Safeway and Tesco.

In 1999, she founded the Asian Women of Achievement Awards, an annual event to acknowledge the achievements of Asian women in Britain. Cherie Blair QC is a patron of the Awards. Blair is also a patron of the Women of the Future Awards, which Lilani founded in 2006 to provide a platform for female talent in the UK. Women of the Future hosts annual global Summit for future women leaders and invites all shortlisted candidates to join a dedicated network. It also incorporates an Ambassadors' Programme to connect the award winners with school sixth-formers, providing A Level students with mentors and role models.

In 2007 Lilani founded the Women of the Future Network, a network of high potential and high achieving UK women. It provides an opportunity for talented women to come together, share experiences and build business relationships.

As part of the vision to build a global, collaborative network of women, Lilani launched the Women of The Future Awards South East Asia in July 2017.

Lilani sits on the advisory boards of Global Diversity Practice, a provider of multi-disciplinary consultancy and learning services and Sapphire Partners, the first executive search firm to actively promote women. Lilani is an Associate Fellow of the Saïd Business School and a British Red Cross Tiffany Circle Ambassador. She is a patron of Frank Water, a charity that partners with grassroots organisations in India to provide safe water

== Honours and awards ==
In 2006 Lilani was presented with a lifetime achievement award at the CBI First Women Awards. In 2012, she was named Woman Entrepreneur of the Year at the Indus Entrepreneurs UK Gala Awards.

Lilani was listed on the BBC Radio 4 Woman's Hour Power List of 100 most powerful women in the UK in 2013. In 2014, she was named as one of GQ and Editorial Intelligence's 100 most connected women, and she was commissioned as a Deputy Lieutenant of Greater London. In 2014, she was also recognized as one of the BBC's 100 women. In 2009, Lilani was named one of the 30 most powerful Muslim women in Britain by The Times and Emel magazine.

Lilani was appointed as Officer of the Order of the British Empire (OBE) in the 2007 New Year Honours for services to charity and as Commander of the Order of the British Empire (CBE) in the Birthday Honours 2015 for services to women in business.

== Books, radio and other recognition ==
In 2011 Lilani spoke at TEDxMarrakesh, sharing inspirational stories and drawing on the kindnesses in our society and how coriander makes the difference. With a demonstration of bombay potatoes thrown in.

On 8 January 2017 Lilani was a guest on BBC Radio 4's Desert Island Discs, giving insight into her childhood in India and starting her business in the UK.

- Lilani, Pinky. Soul Magic: Inspirational Insights; a Collection of Wisdom to Warm Your Heart and Lift Your Spirits. Purley: Development Dynamics, 2000. ISBN 9780953635405
- Lilani, Pinky. Coriander Makes the Difference. Purley: Development Dynamics, 2009.
