= Homepride =

British food brand

- Product type: Food
- Current owner: Kerry Group (flour); Premier Foods (cooking sauces)
- Country: United Kingdom; Republic of Ireland
- Introduced: 1920 (flour); 1974 (cooking sauces)
- Website: homepride.co.uk homeprideflour.co.uk

Homepride is a British food brand owned by Premier Foods for prepared cooking sauces. Premier Foods also licenses the brand to Kerry Group for the production of flour.

== History ==
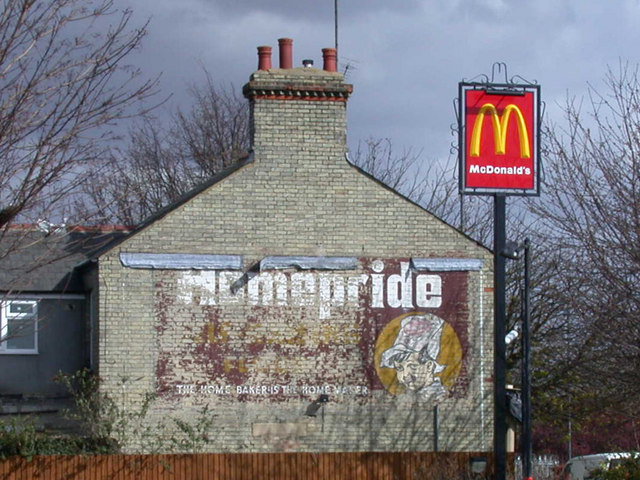
An old painted advert of Homepride, in Cambridge, April 2008. A McDonald's sign can be seen in the foreground.

A technological breakthrough in flour production in 1963 meant that bakers no longer needed to sift their flour. The new flour product was launched under Spillers' Homepride brand. In 1974, Homepride launched a range of prepared cooking sauces. In October 1979, Spillers was acquired by Dalgety plc, after one hostile take over battle.

The company's bakery business was spun off and sold to Allied Bakeries, who in January 2000 sold the flour brand to Kerry Group.

Dalgety retained the brand rights for the production of prepared cooking sauces. After the brand was acquired by the Campbell's, Homepride sauces became one of the sponsors of the police procedural television series The Bill, when their slogan was "the one with the bag". In July 2006, the sauce brand was acquired by Premier Foods.

== Homepride Fred ==
Homepride uses a cartoon character named "Fred the Flour Grader" as part of its marketing. Fred was created by the Geers Gross advertising agency in 1964. Since 1965, the company has used the advertising slogan "Because graded grains make finer flour", employing such voice over artists as John Le Mesurier and Richard Briers.

In March 2014, Premier Foods brought back the Fred character in a new advert for television, to advertise its range of cooking sauces.
