= Cooks the Bakery =

English specialist retail bakery chain

Cooks the Bakery is a specialist retail bakery chain of hot food, sandwiches and coffee, based in Solihull, in the West Midlands, England. The company went into administration on 21 November 2011. The trading rights to Three Cooks and Cooks the bakery were purchased from the administrators in June 2012, Three Cooks Bakery was re-launched under a franchising model with its first store opening in Hanley, Stoke-on-Trent.

== Three Cooks ==
Three Cooks was the name given to a trio of high street bakers formerly trading as Clarks Bakery, Stephen's Bakery and Wimbush the Bakers. Based in Solihull, it was taken over by Rank Hovis McDougall and expanded into a 255 retail bakery, and then sandwich chain business. In 2000, as high street trends changed, it sold the freeholds of the various retail premises.

Due to financial difficulties arising from a downturn in high street trading conditions, in November 2006 the chain went into administration with a footprint of 158 shops, under the legal control of Tenon Group Tenon immediately closed 37 loss-making sites, with around 250 job losses.

== Cooks the Bakery ==
Chairman Geoff Peppiatt bought 121 of the former Three Cooks shops, and managed to save 900 jobs, operating under the new brand Cooks the Bakery. Peppiatt left the business in late 2009, by which time Cooks the Bakery was no longer involved in Van Delivery or Schools Catering.

After this point, the business was run by Richard Prime (managing director) and Steven Greaves (Director) until the final collapse in late 2011. Between Peppiatt leaving and final collapse, the chain faced reducing High Street footfall and rising costs, and had been constantly reducing the number of stores. The company went into administration on 21 November 2011, having shrunk to 16 outlets.
