= Wattie's =

New Zealand based food producer

Heinz Wattie's Limited
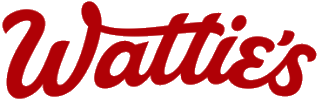
- Industry: Food processing
- Founded: 1934; 92 years ago
- Founder: Sir James Wattie
- Headquarters: Hastings, New Zealand
- Parent: Kraft Heinz
- Website: watties.co.nz

Heinz Wattie's Limited (formerly called Wattie's) is a New Zealand–based food producer of frozen and packaged fruit, vegetables, sauces, baby food, cooking sauces, dressings and pet foods.

== History ==
Founded in Hawke's Bay in 1934 by Sir James Wattie and Harold Carr, the company initially operated under the name J. Wattie Canneries Limited, then later J Wattie Foods Limited, and related companies. Its first product was jam, as Wattie was unhappy that an Auckland jam-making business intended to import jam pulp from Australia.

In February 1962, the company's factory and plant in Hastings was largely destroyed in a fire. The fire destroyed the main steam line from the boiler room to the processing plant. The four boilers themselves were not damaged and production was restored in 50 hours. The insurance claim for damage was half a million pounds, the largest insurance loss in New Zealand to that date.

In 1980, Wattie Industries and Goodman Fielder purchased shares in each other's companies, which led to a merger in 1987 to create Goodman Fielder Wattie Ltd. In 1992 the Wattie's group was bought from Goodman Fielder by American-based H. J. Heinz Company for $565 million.

On 11 March 2026, the company proposed closing its three manufacturing facilities in Auckland, Christchurch and Dunedin. Wattie also proposed ceasing frozen packing at its Hastings facility and terminating the production and sale of several brands and products including frozen food, Gregg's coffee and dipping sauces produced under the Mediterranean, Just Hummus and Good Taste brands. These cutbacks are expected to affect 350 jobs. The company's managing director Andrew Donagan attributed the proposed cutbacks to various challenges to the manufacturing sector including high global inflation. On 27 March, the company confirmed it would close its Auckland, Christchurch and Dunedin factories, and its frozen packaging lines in Hastings; affecting 300 roles.

== Corporate affairs ==
Heinz Wattie employs around 1,900 people, of which approximately 350 are temporary or casual. The company produces its own Wattie's products, some international brands of H. J. Heinz Company, as well as local products under brands like Craig's, Farex, Eta, Oak, Good Taste Company, Greenseas, Earth's Best, Complan, Chef and Champ.

The company has three production centres in New Zealand. Two are in Hastings, where the company was founded, and over 1,200 product lines are produced there. The third production plant, which focuses on producing frozen and dry vegetables, is in Christchurch. In addition, the company also the La Bonne Cuisine Factory in Auckland and the Gregg's coffee factory in Dunedin.

== Products and services ==
Wattie's has an extensive product line consisting of thousands of products. Its baby food products are broken down into five main categories: birth–4 months, 4–6 months, 6–7 months, 8–9 months and 12 months or older. Other canned foods include baked beans, spaghetti, soup, preserved fruits such as apricots and pears, sauce bases, animal food, frozen meals and frozen vegetables.

Wattie's tomato sauce is made in New Zealand, and products carry the label "NZ's Favourite". The television commercials throughout the 1990s used the line "You'll always be a Kiwi, if you love our Wattie's Sauce".

== See also ==
- Goodman Fielder Wattie Book Awards, 1968–1993
