= Geers Gross =

British advertising agency

- Industry: Advertising agency
- Founded: September 30, 1964
- Founders: Robert E. Geers; Robert Gross
- Headquarters: London, United Kingdom
- Area served: United Kingdom; United States

Geers Gross was a British advertising agency founded in 1964 by Americans Bob Geers and Bob Gross after working together in the London office of Benton & Bowles. Gross was a copywriter from New York and Geers was an art director from Missouri.

Geers Gross devised several cartoon characters for UK television advertisements including "Fred the Flourgrader" for Spillers Homepride flour, the Country Life buttermen and the anthropomorphic credit card "Access your flexible friend".

In 1977, the agency opened an office in New York. This ran until 1987, when the US operations of Geers Gross were bought by Interpublic and merged into McCann-Erickson.

Geers left the agency in 1974 to devote time to painting and travel, but returned in 1986 as creative head.

Following the death of Bob Gross in 1991, the agency was acquired by and merged into Publicis.
