= Marvel (food) =

Brand of dried milk powder

- Product type: Milk powder
- Current owner: Premier Foods
- Country: United Kingdom
- Introduced: 1964
- Markets: United Kingdom

Marvel is a United Kingdom brand of dried milk powder, now marketed by Premier Foods.

== History, packaging and use ==
The product was launched in 1964 and is sold in foil-coated cardboard drums with the contents sealed under a tear off foil lid and in sachets.

To make milk from the powder it is necessary to put tablespoons of it into a jug or bowl, then add cold water and stir until all the powder has dissolved.

== See also ==
- Horlicks
- List of dried foods
