= Joseph Rank =

English entrepreneur (1854–1943)

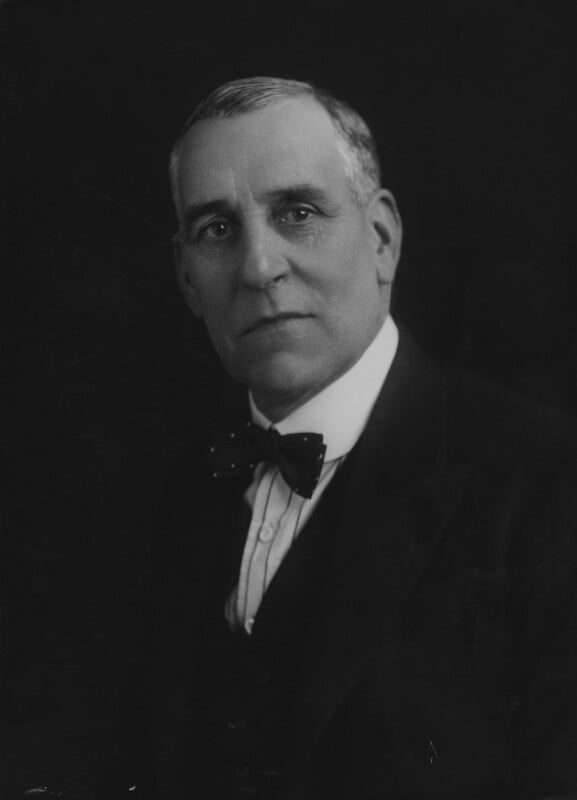
- Rank in 1937
- Born: 28 March 1854; Kingston upon Hull, Yorkshire, England
- Died: 13 November 1943 (aged 89); Reigate Heath
- Spouse(s): Emily Voase; Annie Maria Witty
- Children: 6

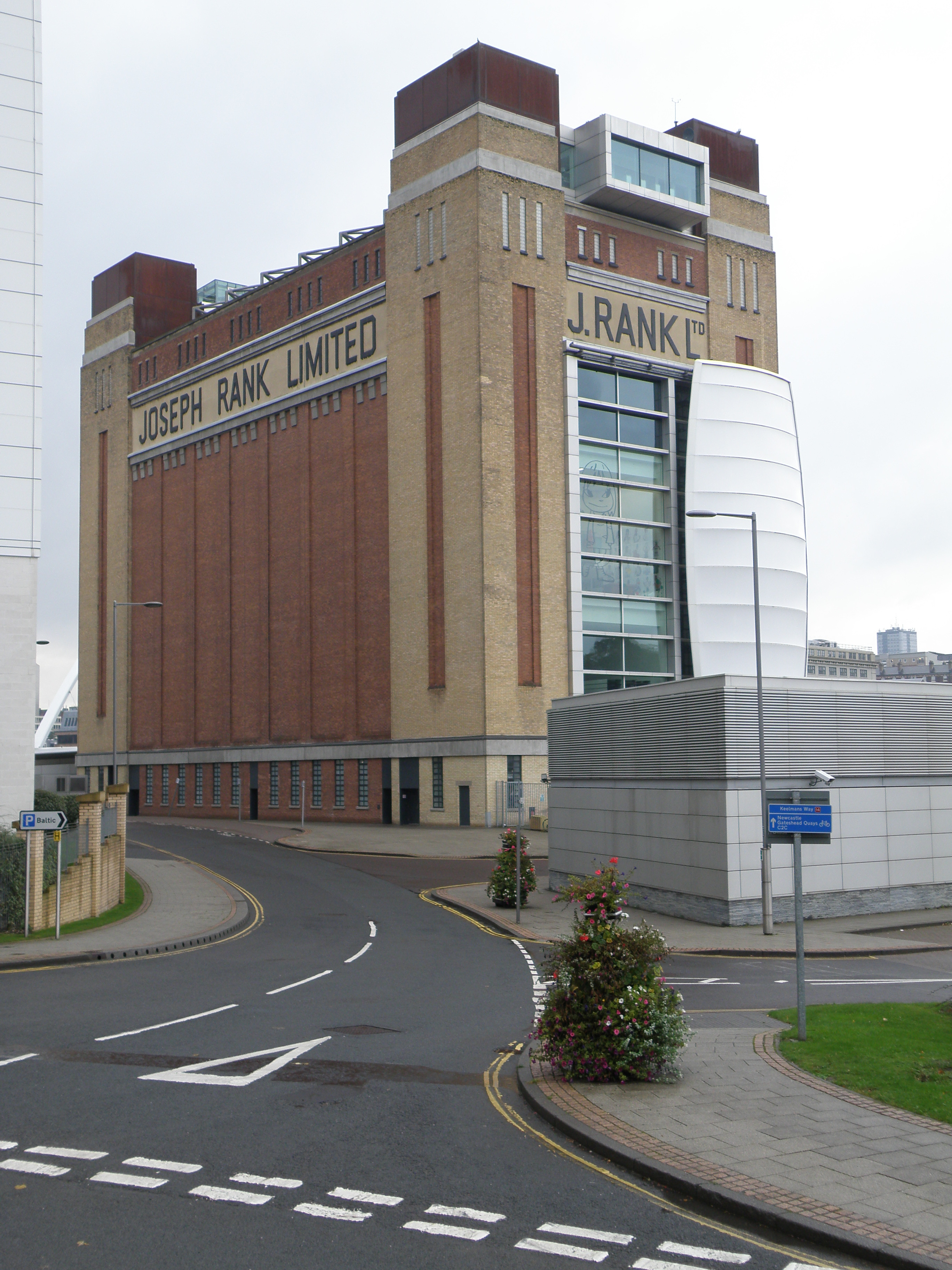
Joseph Rank's name preserved on the former Baltic Flour Mill (now Centre for Contemporary Art) in Gateshead.

Joseph Rank (28 March 1854 – 13 November 1943) was the founder of Joseph Rank Limited, once one of Britain's largest flour milling and bakery companies. He built his company into a leader in all aspects of the industry including the operation of Flour Mills, Bakeries and Retail outlets. After Rank's death in 1943 the company continued to grow under his son's stewardship before merging with Hovis MacDougall in the 1960s to form Rank Hovis McDougall (RHM).

== Career ==
Born in Hull and educated at the Reverend Haynes's School in Swinefleet near Goole, Joseph Rank initially joined the family milling business.

In 1875, he established his own business when he rented a small windmill. Then in 1885 he installed a mechanically driven flour mill at the Alexandra Mill in Hull. His approach was to establish mills close to ports around the United Kingdom so expanding the business until it was the largest flour-milling business in the country.

During the 1880s, he became a staunch Methodist. He was also a lifelong cricket fan. He established various charities which have now been consolidated into the Joseph Rank Trust and also supported the Hull Royal Infirmary. He gave more than £3.5 million to Methodist charities.

During World War I he served on the Wheat Control Board. Sadly, he saw the Clarence Mills that he had built in Hull bombed to destruction during World War II.

He died at his home in Reigate Heath on 13 November 1943. He is buried at Sutton Cemetery.

== Family ==
In 1880, he married Emily Voase and together they had three sons and three daughters, one of whom was J. Arthur Rank, 1st Baron Rank. He married again in 1918, this time to Annie Maria Witty.
