= Angel Delight =

British dessert

- Angel Delight
- Product type: Food
- Current owner: Premier Foods
- Country: United Kingdom
- Introduced: 1967 by Bird's
- Markets: United Kingdom
- Previous owners: Kraft Foods
- Website: AngelDelightDesserts.co.uk

Angel Delight is a powdered dessert mix produced in the United Kingdom. It is designed to be whisked with milk to create a sweet mousse-like dessert.

Angel Delight was released in 1967 by the Bird's company, in a strawberries-and-cream flavour. By the 1970s, Bird's had doubled the market for instant desserts. After a lull in popularity during the 1980s, a revival campaign, featuring Wallace & Gromit, was run in 1999. In 2006 the brand was the best-selling line in the UK instant cold desserts sector. The brand is now owned by Premier Foods. The dessert was named Britain's 'favourite childhood dish' in a 2015 survey by Food Network.

== Varieties ==
Angel Delight is currently sold in five flavours: strawberry, butterscotch, chocolate, chocolate mint and banana. No added sugar variants of butterscotch, white chocolate, and strawberry flavours are also sold. Currently, it is available in three quantity variants: four-serving packets, twelve-serving tubs and single-serving ready-to-eat cups (launched in 2017 in an attempt to modernise the brand, with an accompanying digital marketing campaign). Not all flavours are available in all size formats; for instance, tubs are only available in strawberry and butterscotch flavours.

Discontinued flavours include: coffee, coffee walnut, black cherry, blueberry, peach, lime, lemon, blackcurrant, bubblegum, tangerine, vanilla ice cream, forest fruits, popcorn, candy floss, butter mint, White Chocolate and raspberry.

Catering packs of 600g and 12x600g are still available in raspberry and banana flavours, as well as the retail flavours.

== See also ==
- Bird's Custard
- Instant pudding
