= Robertson's =

Scottish brand of marmalades and jams

- Product type: Food
- Current owner: Hain Celestial Group
- Country: Scotland
- Introduced: 1864
- Previous owners: Rank Hovis McDougall; Premier Foods
- Website: www.robertsons.co.uk

Robertson's is a Scottish brand of marmalades and fruit preserves that was founded by James Robertson in 1864. The firm was run as a partnership until 1903, when it was incorporated as a limited company: James Robertson & Sons, Preserve Manufacturers, Limited. It produces the "Golden Shred" marmalade, a recipe created in 1874 and registered as a trademark in 1886, among other products including "Silver Shred" a lemon marmalade launched in 1909; "Mincemeat", a traditional Scottish style mincemeat made from raisins, peel, sugar and beef suet; and "Bramble Jelly", a traditional Scottish style jam, strained of its seeds. Robertson's received their first Royal Warrant from King George V in 1933.

== History ==
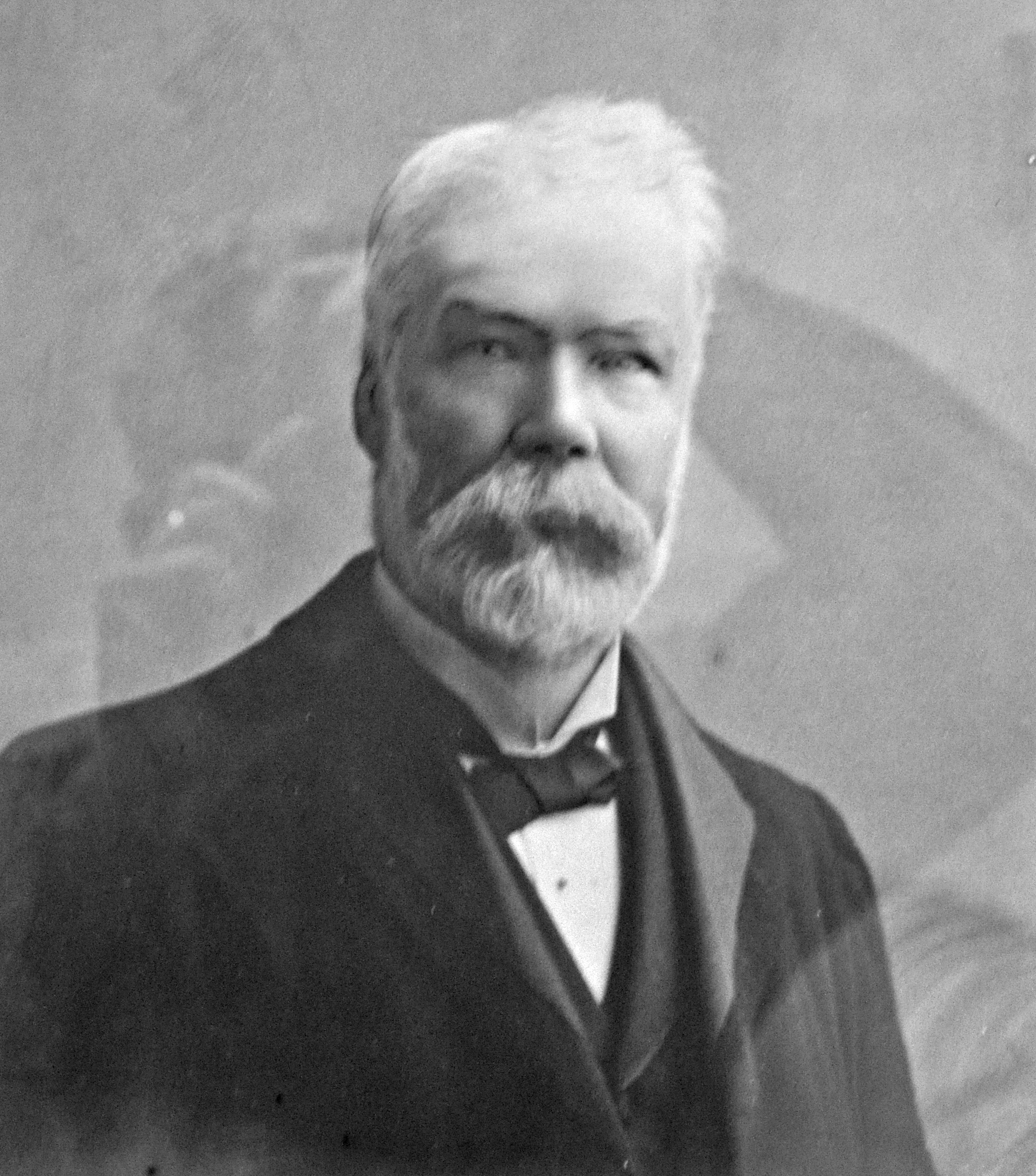
James Robertson, founder of the company, created Golden Shred marmalade circa 1874

James Robertson of Paisley, Renfrewshire, Scotland, was born on 16 January 1832 in Niddry Street, Paisley. He began life working in the local thread mills at the age of eight. During a long down turn in the silk trade, in 1847 Robertson's parents decided to apprentice him to a local grocer, Gibson & Craig, wine spirit and tea merchants at 107 High Street in Paisley. This redefined Robertson's future. Only at this late stage did he learn to read and write, attending night classes at Seedhill School. He married Marion McFadyen on 15 June 1856.

In 1859, Robertson started up an independent grocery at 86 Causeyside Street, Paisley. In 1864, he took pity on a struggling salesman, buying a barrel of Seville oranges, known for their bitter taste, knowing they would not sell well, from which Marion Robertson made a sweet tasting marmalade, which James Robertson perfected in 1874, branded as "Golden Shred". Robertson rented factory space at Thrushgrove. In 1880, Robertson bought land at Stevenson Street in Paisley and built a three-storey, custom-made marmalade factory. Jam and mincemeat were added to the range.

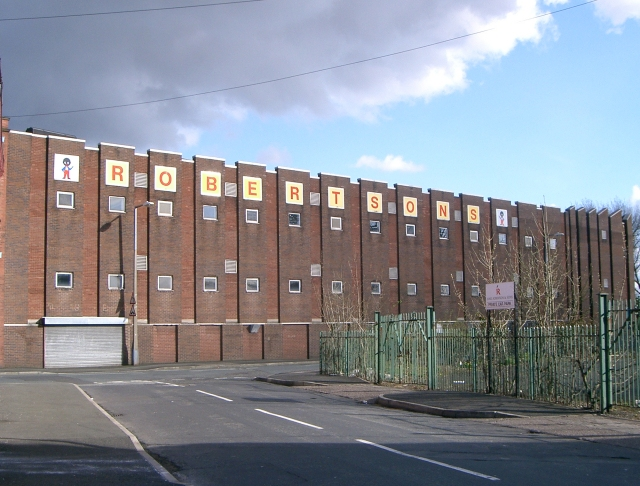
Robertson's Jam Factory in Droylsden

In 1891 the company built a second English-based factory to meet southern demand, at Droylsden, Manchester, run by James' second son William. In 1900 a third factory was built in Catford in London, run by James' youngest son David (1870–1948). In 1914 a fourth factory was created at Brislington near Bristol.

In 1903, James Robertson & Sons, Preserve Manufacturers, Limited was incorporated to run the business.

The famous Robertson's Golliwog symbol (not seen as racially charged at the time) appeared in 1910 after a trip to the US to set up a plant in Boston. His son John bought a golliwog doll there. For some reason this started to appear first on their price lists and was then adopted as their trade mark.

In 1914 James Robertson died aged 83. He had been a member of the council, a magistrate, a school director, and the manager of a savings bank, as well as belonging to a variety of philanthropic societies. His eldest son John (1859–1937) succeeded as company chairman, establishing the firm as a leader in the preserves industry. Robertson's were awarded royal warrants of appointment by King George V in 1933, King George VI and also by Queen Elizabeth. John's eldest son David (b. 1893) took over the chairmanship on his death.

In the 1920s a Robertson's factory was built in Water Lane, Brislington, Bristol. This was expanded and became the largest jam factory in Europe, and was served by its own branch railway line.

The Catford factory was closed in 1970, and the Paisley factory closed in 1974, and is now a housing estate, St. Andrew's Court, with the street itself named Robertson's Gait.

In 1981 the loss-making company was bought by Avana Foods, who also closed the Bristol factory, concentrating production in Droylsden.

The brand was owned by Rank Hovis McDougall from 1987, alongside premium brand Frank Cooper's, prior to the purchase of the entire RHM business by Premier Foods in 2007.

Shortly after the takeover in 2007, owner Premier Foods announced the closure of the factories in both Ledbury and Droylsden by the end of the year, with the group's UK jam production all concentrated on Hartley's plant at Histon, Cambridgeshire. The Droylsden factory was demolished in 2010. Only the small building that housed the electricity mains transformer remains on an otherwise derelict site.

In December 2008, Premier Foods announced that it would discontinue jam in the UK under the Robertson brand in 2009. This removed the internal rivalry between two of their products: Hartley's jam and Robertson's jam. The Robertson's label was retained to focus on the marmalades: Golden Shred and Silver Shred. The Hartley's name was concentrated on the jam range.

In 2012, Premier Foods sold its sweet spreads and jellies business to US multi-national Hain Celestial Group for £200 million. In 2013 James Robertson and Sons Ltd, first incorporated in 1903 was dissolved. In 2015, James Robertson and Sons Ltd was incorporated by James Robertson's great-great-grandson (also James Robertson).

== Main products ==
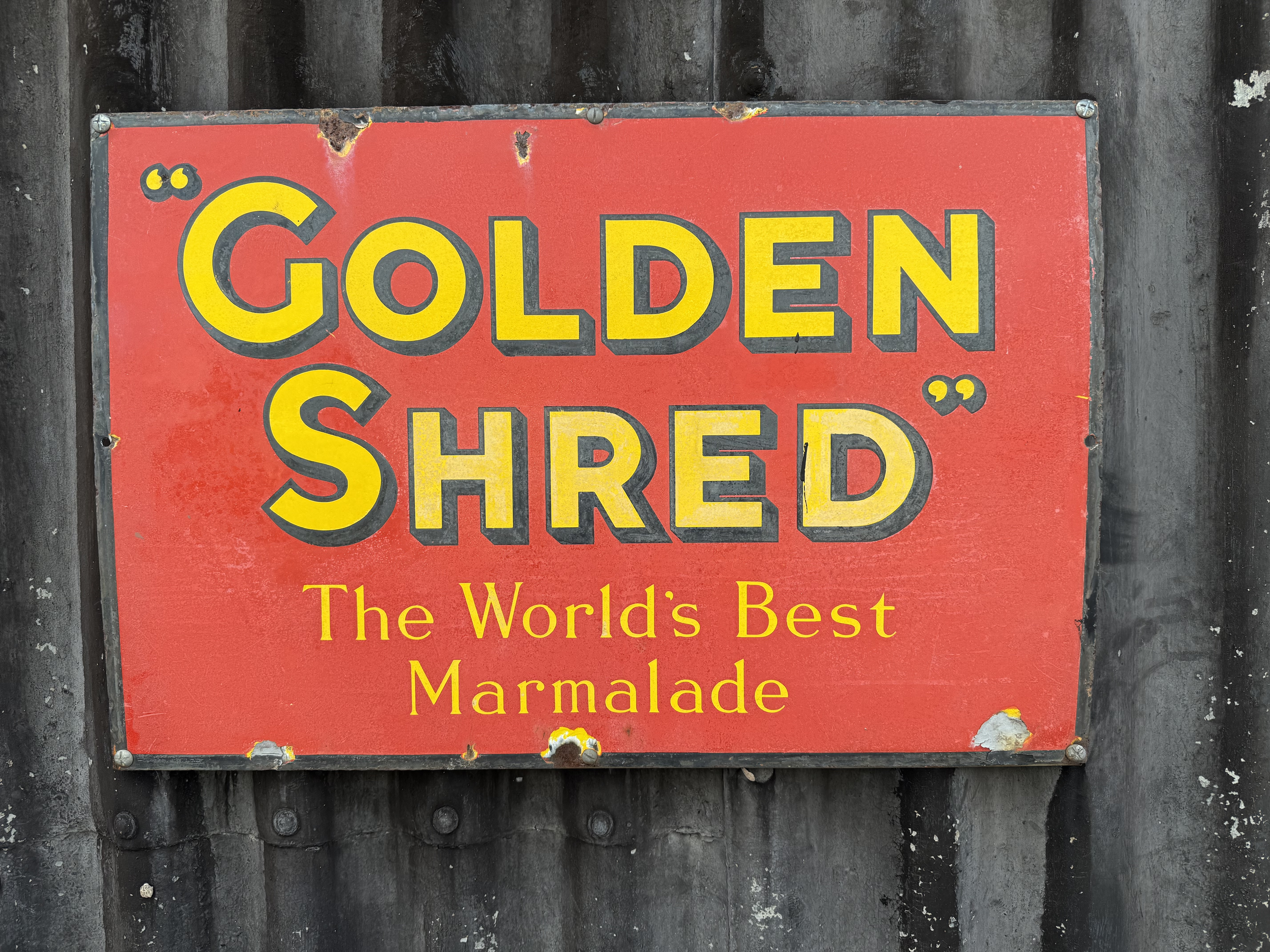
An enamel advertisement sign at Buckfastleigh railway station

- "Golden Shred" – a traditional orange marmalade made from bitter Seville oranges, which used to come in thick cut; thin cut (by 2025, one cut only); and shredless ("Golden Shredless")
- "Silver Shred" – a lemon marmalade launched in 1909
- "Mincemeat" – a traditional Scottish style mincemeat made from raisins, peel, sugar and beef suet
- "Bramble Jelly" – a traditional Scottish style jam, strained of its seeds

== Marketing ==
=== Golly branding ===
Just before World War I, John Robertson (son of James Robertson) was on a tour of the United States. Whilst on a visit to the backwoods he noticed many young children playing with little black rag dolls with white eyes, made from their mothers' discarded black skirts and white blouses. Intrigued by the popularity of the "Golly", he thought it would make an ideal mascot and trade mark for the Robertson's range of products. Accepted by the company, Golly was first shown on Robertson literature in 1910, on items such as labels and price lists.

==== Collectables series ====
In the mid-1920s, skilled enameller H. Miller from Birmingham's Jewellery Quarter approached the company with the idea of enamelled "mascots". Miller produced the first design, a Golly golfer in 1928. These brooches were given out to people posting in sufficient labels from jars of jam.

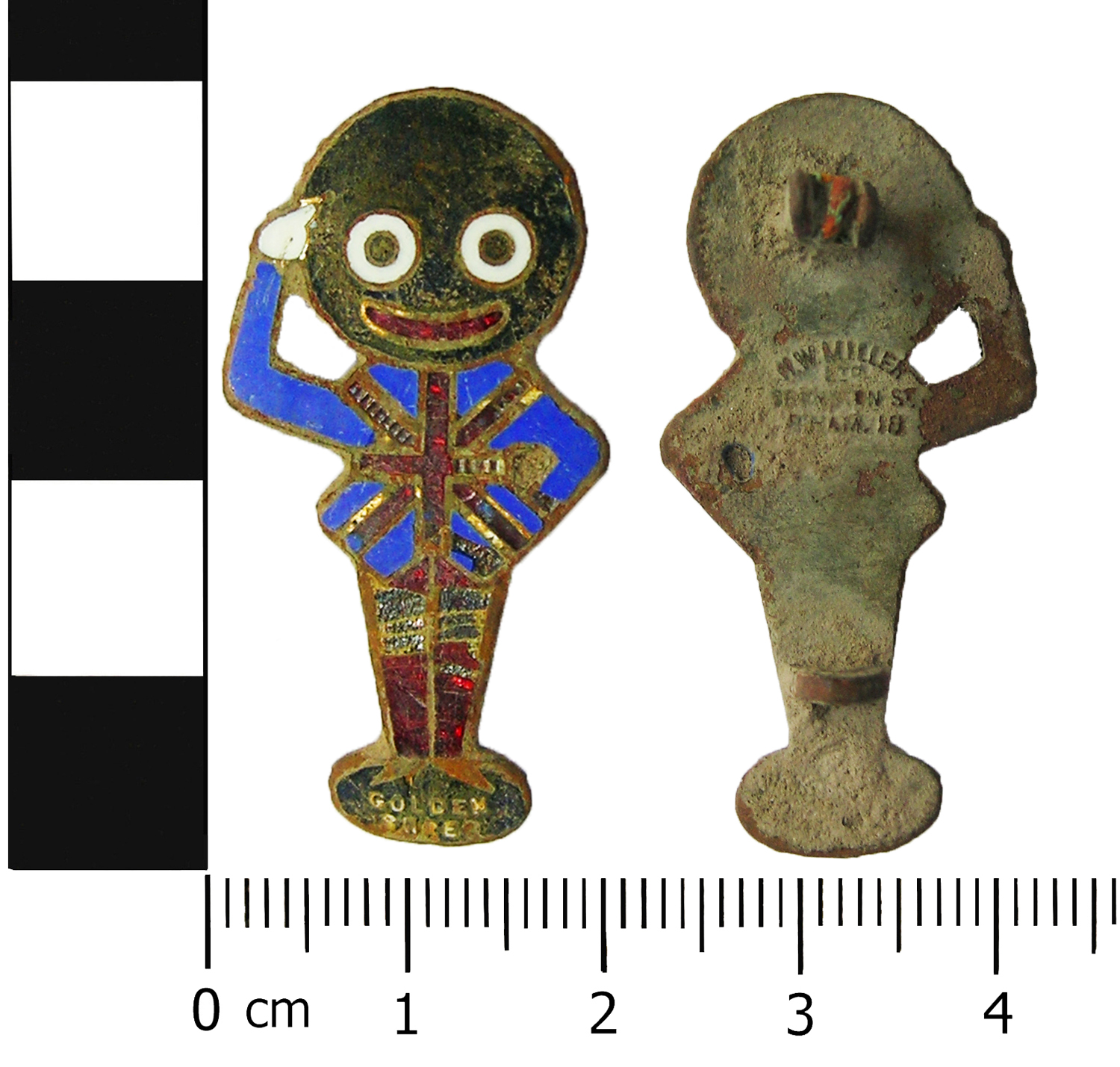
Coronation Golly badge from 1937

Developed as a brooch-based collector series, by the early 1930s the Golly had appeared in little fruit designs, many of which were worn as jewellery because of their high quality. More sporting designs followed, including county cricketers and footballers with footballs in team colours. 1937 saw the Coronation Golly, complete with Union Jack on its chest.

In 1939 the scheme was discontinued as the metal was needed for the war effort, but by 1946 the Golly was back again. The Golly pendant with chain was introduced by popular demand in 1956. In the 1970s, the design of all Gollies changed from the old Golly with "pop eyes" to a new Golly with eyes looking to the left. The words "Golden Shred" were removed from his waistcoat, his legs straightened and smile broadened.

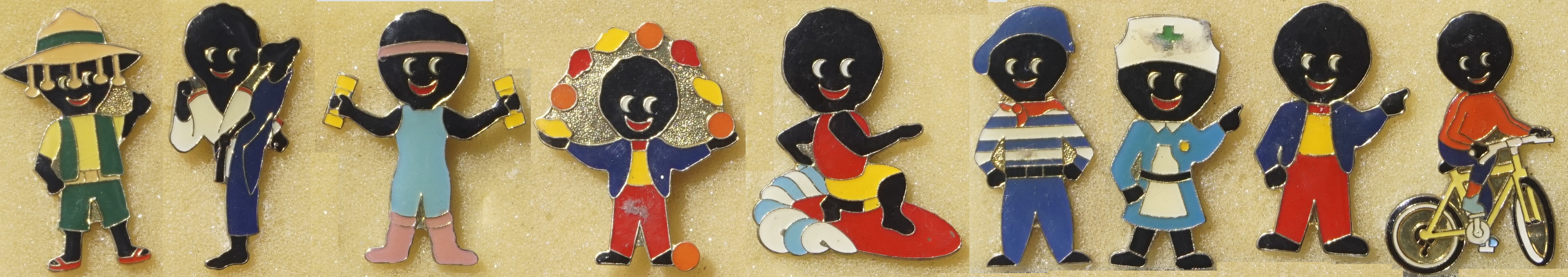

At about the same time a range of 11 footballer and 12 musician Golly figures were produced in plaster, standing about 2.5" high.

The Robertson Golly was not only limited to badges. There were Robertson Golly dolls, ceramic, Golly games for children, the 1979 illustrated storybook Here Comes Golly by Gyles Brandreth and even Golly clothing. At the start of the 1980s the hard enamelled badges were replaced with cheaper to produce acrylic badges, but this did not affect their popularity.

When production stopped in 2001, over 20 million Gollies had been sent out.

==== Controversy and eventual discontinuation ====
Golly has been described as a racist caricature, along with pickaninnies, minstrels, mammy figures, and other caricatures of black Africans.

Robertson's officially retired Golly in 2002. The company had found that Golly was, on the whole, no longer popular nor familiar with children, although the scheme was still successful and popular with adult collectors. Robertson's insisted that they did not retire the Golly because of the pressure of political correctness in later decades, but simply for commercial reasons. The brand director at Robertson's commented:

We are retiring Golly because we found families with kids no longer necessarily knew about him. We are not bowing to political correctness, but like with any great brand we have to move with the times.

=== Sponsorship ===
In the 1970s, Robertsons sponsored Clare Francis in her entry with her Ohlson 38 yacht Robertson's Golly in the Observer Singlehanded Transatlantic Race, in which she finished thirteenth overall and set a new women's single-handed transatlantic record.

=== World of Roald Dahl ===
In 2001, the Golly collectables were replaced by seven Roald Dahl-created characters, as illustrated by Quentin Blake. These included the Big Friendly Giant, Matilda, James and the Giant Peach, and Willy Wonka. This collectables scheme ended in 2006.

=== Paddington Bear ===
In 2010, Robertson's featured the fictional Paddington Bear, famous for his love of marmalade, on its jars of Golden Shred marmalade. It teamed up again with the Bear in 2014, tied-in to the Paddington film, including a limited-edition version of Golden Shred. The partnership was continued for the sequel, Paddington 2.
