= Essence of chicken =

Asian dietary supplement

- A bottle of chicken essence
- Type: Dietary supplement
- Other name: Chicken essence
- Origin: United Kingdom; today popular in Southeast Asia
- Introduced: 1820s
- Ingredients: Chicken meat Traditional herbs (e.g. cordyceps or ginseng) (optional)

Essence of chicken or chicken essence is a drink that is popular in some Asian countries as a dietary supplement. It is often consumed for its believed health and nutritional benefits, and as a study aid for students.

== History ==
Double-boiled chicken soup has traditionally been valued in Chinese culture as a health food, such as for people who are weak, ill, or recovering from childbirth or surgery.

In the 1820s, British royal chef H. W. Brand created essence of chicken as a fat-free and easily digestible chicken broth for King George IV, who was in poor health, and who recovered after he drank the broth. After retiring from the palace in 1835, (Note: Two articles—The New York Times in 1996 and The Straits Times in 2001—give 1835 as the year Brand developed chicken essence for King George IV. However, this is not possible as George IV was only king from 1820 to his death in 1830, and all sources agree that Brand developed chicken essence for George IV (or "King George"), not for William IV who was king in 1835. Most sources (including the Brand's website) give 1835 as the year Brand left the palace and started selling chicken essence commercially, not the year he created the product.) Brand started to sell the product as "Brand's Essence of Chicken", marketing it as for "convalescents and invalids". The product arrived in Asia in the 1920s and became popular among the Chinese community in colonies such as British Malaya (including today's Singapore and Malaysia), because it was seen as a "potent and convenient version of the traditional double-boiled chicken soup". It soon gained popularity among other ethnic groups as well.

Apart from Brand's, other brands that have entered the chicken essence market include Eu Yan Sang and Goh Joo Hin, which sells the New Moon brand of chicken essence.

== Production ==
Chicken essence is produced by cooking chicken meat in a water extraction process under high-temperature and high-pressure conditions. The resulting liquid is concentrated and bottled as chicken essence.

Various traditional herbs have sometimes been added to chicken essence, such as cordyceps or ginseng.

In 2006, a dispute occurred between Brand's and Eu Yan Sang over the latter's advertising, in which it promoted itself as "caramel-free" in contrast to an unidentified bottle resembling Brand's, prompting Brand's to submit a complaint. Brand's said that the caramel was used as a food colouring and constituted only 0.32% of each bottle, and the Agri-Food and Veterinary Authority of Singapore said caramel food colouring was allowed and did not affect the safety of chicken essence.

== Culture ==
Chicken essence is a common dietary supplement in Southeast Asia, as it is believed to have health and nutritional benefits, alleviate stress and fatigue, and improve cognitive performance. It is often consumed before examinations by students in parts of Asia, such as in Singapore, Malaysia, China, and Hong Kong. In Singapore, chicken essence is marketed as a study aid, and many parents give it to their children as they prepare for exams. The Straits Times wrote in 2015 that Brand's chicken essence is "indelibly associated with the Singaporean rite of passage of the Primary School Leaving Examination (PSLE)".

Formerly, chicken essence advertisements in Singapore often featured top scorers in the PSLE and other national exams. (For example, the New Moon brand launched its first campaign with PSLE top scorers in 2005; the advertisements featuring two 2004 top students were printed in newspapers and displayed on 70 buses across the country.) In 2012, the Ministry of Education stopped announcing top scorers' names as part of changes intended to reduce educational stress and avoid "over-emphasis on academic results", prompting online commentators to question how chicken essence would now be advertised. Then–Minister of State for Trade and Industry Teo Ser Luck suggested focusing on students who had "overcome the odds" to do well instead. Supermarket operator FairPrice has given free breakfast bundles to students taking the PSLE, including chicken essence as well as breakfast foods such as bread, fruit and cereal.

== See also ==
- Chicken soup
