= Anjum Anand =

British food writer and chef

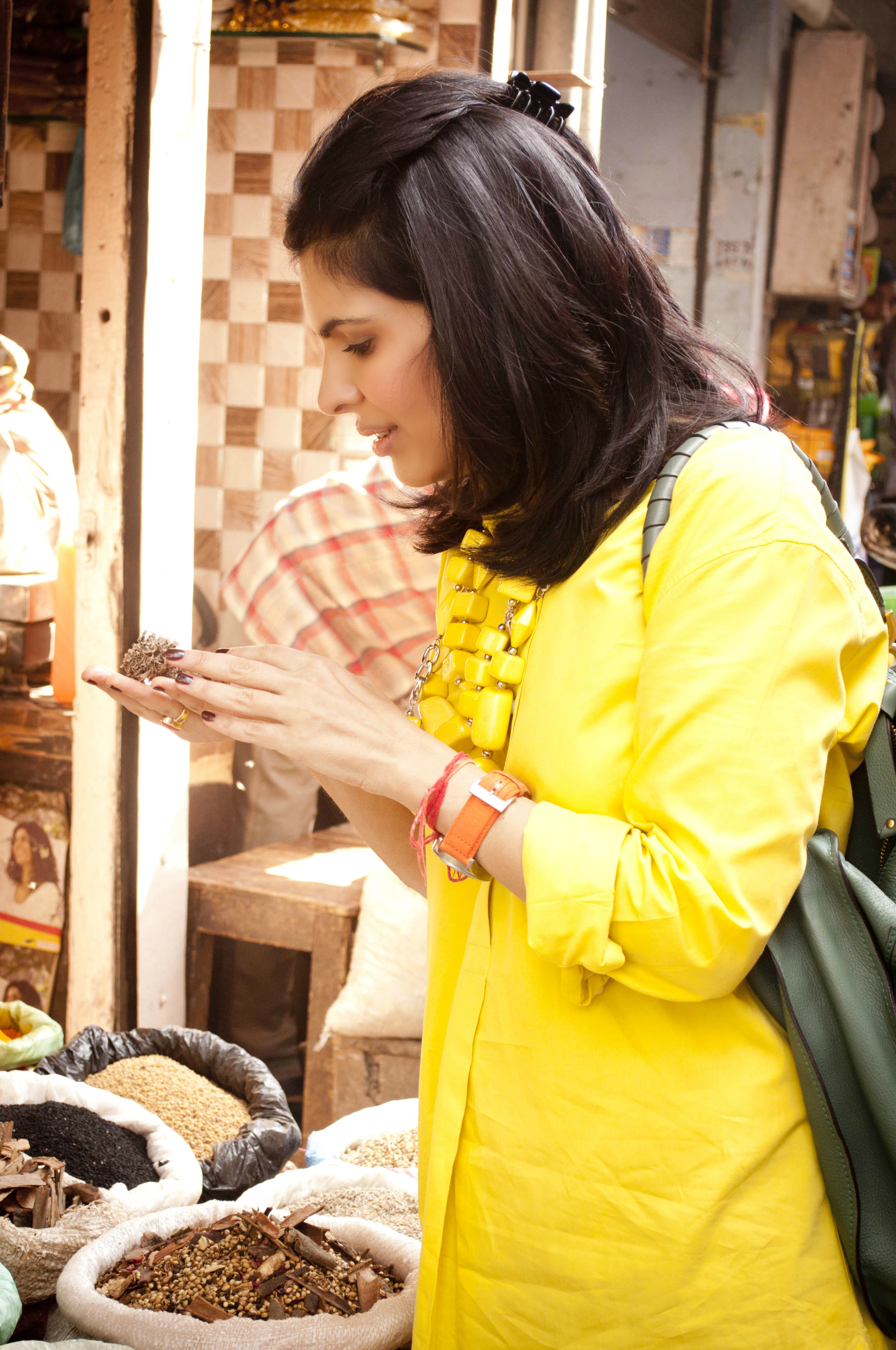
- Anand in 2013
- Born: 25 August 1971 (age 54); London, England
- Education: Business Administration School of Geneva
- Culinary career
- Cooking style: Indian cuisine
- Television show(s): Great Food Live Anjum's Spice Stories Market Kitchen Indian Food Made Easy
- Website: Official site

Anjum Anand (born 15 August 1971) is a British food writer and TV chef of Indian cuisine.

== Biography ==
Anjum Anand grew up in London; however she has also lived and studied in Geneva (where she attended the International School of Geneva), Paris, and Madrid. She speaks French and Spanish and holds a degree in European business administration from the European Business School London. For a period, Anand ran a business importing flat-pack furniture from Eastern Europe.

Her perspective on adapting healthy meals from a traditionally rich Indian diet came from personal experience of weight problems while growing up. Her diet consists of varied traditional dishes, recreated with wholesome ingredients and limited oil. At age 25, her first book, entitled Indian Every Day: Light Healthy Indian Food, was published.

Anand became a regular guest on UKTV Food's Great Food Live from 2004 to 2007, and appeared in the BBC Two series Indian Food Made Easy broadcast in 2007. Her accent and flirtatious manner have led to her being dubbed "the Nigella Lawson of Indian cuisine in Britain".

She has been a regular contributor to The Times Online food pages since 2007. She has acted as consultant chef to Birds Eye brand to develop a range of healthy Indian ready meals. In September 2008, Anand published her third recipe book Anjum's New Indian, followed by a new BBC television series in November.

In mid-2011, she launched the brand The Spice Tailor, which makes Indian sauces. The brand was sold to Premier Foods in October 2022.

== Personal life ==
In addition to England, Anand also owns family homes in both Delhi and Calcutta.

== Published works ==
- Indian Every Day: Light, Healthy Indian Food (2003, Headline, ISBN 0-7553-1201-5)
- Indian Food Made Easy (2007, Quadrille Publishing, ISBN 978-1-84400-571-0)
- Anjum's New Indian (2008, Quadrille Publishing, (ISBN 978-1-84400-616-8)
- Anjum's Eat Right For Your Body Type (2010, Quadrille Publishing, (ISBN 978-1-84400-757-8)
- I Love Curry (2010, Quadrille Publishing, (ISBN 978-1-84400-889-6)
- Anjum's Indian Vegetarian Feast (2012, Quadrille Publishing, ISBN 978-1-84949-120-4)
