= Rank Hovis McDougall =

United Kingdom food business

- Type: Public
- Traded as: LSE: RHM
- Industry: Food
- Founded: 1875
- Defunct: 2007
- Fate: Acquired
- Successor: Premier Foods
- Headquarters: Marlow, United Kingdom
- Key people: J. Arthur Rank (Chairman)

RHM plc, formerly Rank Hovis McDougall, was a United Kingdom food business. The company owned numerous brands, particularly for flour, where its core business started, and for consumer food products. It was listed on the London Stock Exchange and was once a constituent of the FTSE 100 Index but was acquired by Premier Foods in March 2007; many of its brands continue to be produced.

== History ==
=== Early years ===
The company was founded by Joseph Rank in 1875 as a flour milling business when he rented a small windmill. He initially lost money and therefore took a co-tenancy at West's Holderness Corn Mill. In 1885 he built a mechanically driven flour mill in Hull in order to beat competition from abroad. He used steel rollers instead of mill stones, thereby producing six sacks of flour an hour instead of one and a half. In 1888 he built another steel-roller plant in Lincolnshire; soon afterwards, he built a more modern plant, producing 20 sacks of flour an hour.

As he strove for greater productivity he installed equipment that produced 30 sacks of flour an hour, and then 40 sacks an hour. He also set up agencies to distribute his flour in parts of England where it previously had not been sold. In May 1899 the business was incorporated as a private company under the name Joseph Rank Limited.

In 1902, Joseph Rank made his first trip to the United States to understand and beat his American competitors. Soon after his trip abroad, the company built mills in London and Cardiff. In 1912, a mill in Birkenhead was built to supply the needs of Ireland and northwestern England. Rank then moved the corporate headquarters of the company from Yorkshire to London.

During World War II the company employed 3,000 workers, many of them women working while their husbands were away at war. In 1935 Joseph Rank was awarded the Freedom of the City of Hull, in part because of a trust fund he had set up in Hull to help "poor persons of good character."

During the 1920s, Rank expanded into Scotland and Ireland. He also formed the British Isles Transport Company Limited to facilitate transport of his products around the country. The company was first listed on the London Stock Exchange in 1933. In 1943 James Rank became chairman following his father's death.

In 1945, James Rank, the new chairman, assisted by Cecil Loombe, who had become a director, set about rebuilding mills destroyed by bombing, which included the new Baltic Flour Mill at Gateshead, opened in 1950.

In 1952, James Rank was succeeded by his brother J. Arthur Rank as chairman. Arthur explored ways of improving quality control in food production, founding RHM Technology and its research centre at High Wycombe.

=== Formation of RHM ===
In 1962, the company acquired the Hovis-McDougall Company, founded in 1957 after the merger of Hovis Bread Flour Company, founded in 1898, and McDougall Brothers, founded in 1864 by Alexander, Isaac, Arthur, John and James Thomas, with its famous Hovis brand of bread. With the acquisition, the company became Rank Hovis McDougall Limited (RHM). In 1968 RHM went on to buy the Cerebos food group, which brought with it a number of popular food brands as well as interests in France, Argentina, New Zealand, Australia, Canada, the United States and South Africa. In 1969 Arthur's nephew, Joseph Rank, took over the chairmanship of the company.

Joseph Rank encouraged research work in crustacea farming, cereal and seed production, and wheat hybrids. He also pioneered protein production from starch. In 1984 the company established a joint venture with ICI known as Marlow Foods. It was Marlow Foods that created the meat substitute product Quorn.

In 1979, RHM divested its Canadian business to Campbell Soup Company.

In 1981, Sir Peter Reynolds took over as chairman from Joseph Rank. The company made a number of important acquisitions during the 1980s in the United Kingdom, the United States, and the Far East including the purchase in 1987 of Avana Group, which was renamed Avana Bakeries Limited.

In 1992, the company was purchased by Tomkins plc who then sold it on to Doughty Hanson & Co in 2000. The company remained in private equity ownership and sold a number of non-core businesses, including bakery retail chain Three Cooks. In July 2005 it was relisted on the London Stock Exchange.

In March 2007, RHM was acquired by Premier Foods for £1.2 billion. Premier made a loss in 2012 and cut production.

== Operations ==
Prior to takeover, the group was grouped into three divisions: Bread Bakeries, Culinary Brands and Cakes & Customer Partnerships. Premier Foods is in the process of integrating Culinary Brands, Cakes and Customer Partnerships into its core business unit, although Bread Bakeries (including Rank Hovis milling) are to remain as a stand-alone business unit.

=== List of brands ===
- Atora shredded suet
- Be-Ro flour
- Bisto gravy
- Cadbury's cakes (manufactured under licence from Cadbury plc)
- Cerebos salt
- Frank Cooper's jams
- Hovis bread and flour
- Kake Brand cooking chocolate
- McDougalls flour and cake mixes
- Mother's Pride bread
- Mr Kipling cakes
- Paxo stuffing
- Robertson's jams
- Rombouts coffee
- Saxa salt
- Sharwood's Indian, Chinese and SE Asian sauces

== The Rank name ==
A common misconception is that the "Rank" in the name signifies an acquired business of the Rank Organisation. This is understandable as Rank themselves were at one point a highly diversified conglomerate, and were apt to rename acquired or joint venture business by prefixing them with the name "Rank", e.g. Rank Xerox. There is a link, but the "Rank" reference is to Joseph Rank, father of Lord Rank, who merely inherited the business upon his father's death. It always remained a separately run enterprise.

== See also ==
- Rank Hovis McDougall assisted with the renovation of the historic Preston Mill at East Lothian, Scotland
