= James Wattie =

New Zealand businessman (1902–1974)

- Born: March 23, 1902; Hawarden, New Zealand
- Died: June 8, 1974 (aged 72); Mangateretere, New Zealand
- Occupation: Cannery businessman
- Organization: Wattie's

Sir James Wattie CBE (23 March 1902 – 8 June 1974) was a New Zealand clerk, accountant, company manager, industrialist, philanthropist and race-horse owner.

Wattie was born in Hawarden in 1902. In 1934, he founded food processing company Wattie's. Wattie had a reputation for his humility and friendliness towards his staff, with his constant effort to look after and understand his staff's problems. Upon his death in 1974, his company and workplace philosophies were carried on by his sons, Gordon and Raymond. Since 1992 the company has been owned by H. J. Heinz Company which is one of the world's leading food manufacturing companies.

In 1953, Wattie was awarded the Queen Elizabeth II Coronation Medal. In the 1963 New Year Honours, he was appointed a Commander of the Order of the British Empire, for services to the processed food industry. Wattie was made a Knight Bachelor in the 1966 Queen's Birthday Honours, for services to industry and the export trade. His horse Even Stevens won the 1962 Melbourne Cup.

In 1994, Wattie was posthumously inducted into the New Zealand Business Hall of Fame.
