= Ella Hudson Gasking =

British industrialist and engineer

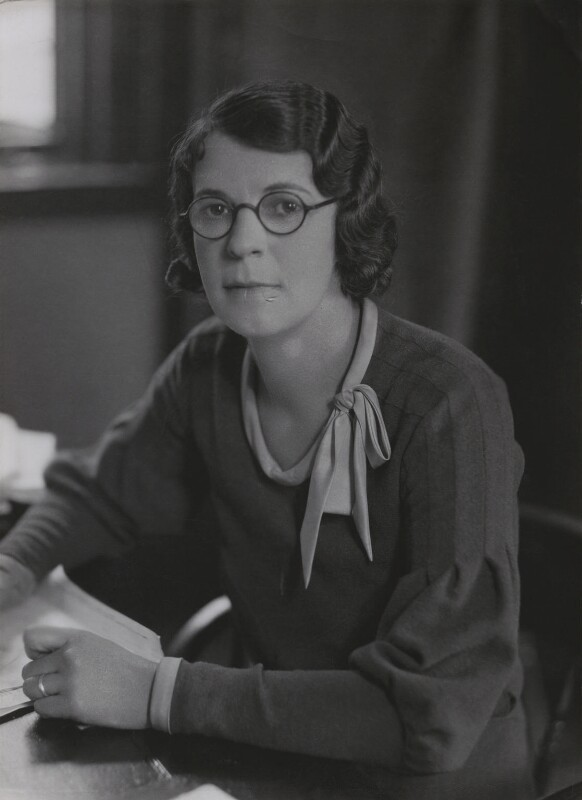
Ella Hudson Gasking in the 1930s, photographed by Elliott & Fry

Ella Hudson Gasking, née Batchelor OBE (4 April 1891 – 17 December 1966), was a prominent British businesswoman in the food manufacturing sector as chairman and managing director of Batchelors, and was one of Sheffield's best-known industrialists in the 20th century. She was known in business as Mrs E. H. Gasking.

== Early life ==
Ella Hudson Batchelor was born in Sheffield in 1891 and was educated at the Central Secondary School in the city. She was the second daughter in the family of at least four sons and two daughters of William and Annie Batchelor. Her father was a tea packer and produce merchant in Sheffield and found a way to preserve vegetables, especially peas, by canning. He opened a factory and the firm, Batchelor's Peas Ltd, had grown to employ 50 people when he died at the age of 53 in 1913. His wife was an invalid and his sons soon left to fight in the First World War, and so it was left to his daughter, who had joined the business aged 18, to take over as managing director of the company.

== Career ==
Although she did a course of teacher training, Ella had had no formal business education. She later said that 'I myself never even dreamed of being a business woman ... I took over because I had to'. Under her leadership the factory expanded and Batchelors became a household name. A 1937 article noted that '... her leadership and business acumen have developed what was originally a small family business into a great undertaking with a turnover of a million a year ... Mrs Gasking believes that knowing whom to trust is half the battle in business. She sums people up astutely, and can tell at once whether or not they are worthy of confidence. Also, she has charm - the power of winning other people.' Her younger brothers Maurice and Frederick joined the Batchelors firm after the First World War.

While peas remained the main product, production expanded to soups, other vegetables and fruit. Ella Gasking opened a new pea canning factory at Wadsley Bridge, Sheffield, in 1937. It was then the largest canning plant in Britain, covering 12 acres. It cost the then enormous sum of £100,000 and was built and fitted with the latest technology – including electric appliances – and facilities and services for workers (who were predominantly female), including keep-fit classes, tennis courts, hockey pitches and showers. She also visited the United States to investigate the latest canning methods and attended the American Canners' Convention in Chicago.

She was a member of the Women's Engineering Society and 1938 shared an article about the new factory, which produced 1.5 million tins of peas a week.

Batchelors was taken over by Unilever in 1943, but Ella Gasking continued to work in the business until she retired as chairman and joint managing director in 1948. In that year she was appointed OBE in the Birthday Honours in recognition of her contribution to the grocery industry and to the war effort, as the firm had been a leading supplier of canned goods to the British armed forces.

She was appointed a member of the British Transport Commission Hotels Executive in May 1948, and was a part-time member of the Docks and Inland Waterways Executive in 1949.

== Personal life and interests ==
Ella Batchelor married Cyril Trist Gasking, then a medical student serving in the army, on 11 February 1915 in her hometown.

Ella had a number of different interests outside her family business, including golf, gardening, travelling, holidaying in the South of France and South America. She was interested in breeding pedigree cattle, owning a 600-acre farm in Lincolnshire. She owned racehorses and her racing colours were yellow with green dots, suitably representing peas. She was President of the Isle of Wight branch of the Electrical Association for Women.

Ella Hudson Gasking died at Newport on the Isle of Wight in 1966.
