= Asian Home Gourmet =

Food manufacturer

- Type: Subsidiary
- Industry: Food
- Founded: Asian Home Gourmet (1982)
- Founder: Kwan Lui
- Headquarters: Singapore, Singapore
- Area served: North America, South America, Europe, Asia-Pacific
- Products: sauces
- Owner: Kraft Heinz
- Website: asianhomegourmet.net

Asian Home Gourmet is a manufacturer of Asian spice pastes and sauces owned by Kraft Heinz since 2018. Its products focus on popular flavours from Asia including Singapore, Thailand, Vietnam, Indonesia, India, China, Japan and Korea and are now sold in over 41 countries and 8000 supermarkets around the globe.

In addition to the spice paste and sauces range, Asian Home Gourmet has expanded to sell a professional range designed for the restaurant industry.

== History ==
Asian Home Gourmet was established in Singapore in 1982 by Kwan Lui. Although the business was acquired by Cerebos Pacific Limited in 1996, Lui retained 50% ownership and retained rights to the brand. The company initially sold in local Singaporean markets before commercialising and moving its factories to Thailand.

Asian Home Gourmet were major sponsors for the Sydney Chinese New Year Festival in 2009 and 2010.

In April, 2011, Asian Home Gourmet was mentioned in Oprah Winfrey's O, The Oprah Magazine as a choice Asian food available in supermarkets.

In 2012 Cerebos was taken private by Suntory Holdings of Japan.

In 2017 Suntory Holdings announced the sale of Asian Home Gourmet along with most of Cerebos Pacific's Australian and New Zealand food assets to Kraft Heinz.

== See also ==
- List of food companies
