= Atora =

British food brand

- Product type: Food
- Current owner: Premier Foods
- Country: United Kingdom
- Introduced: 1893
- Markets: United Kingdom
- Previous owners: Rank Hovis McDougall
- Website: www.atora.co.uk

Atora is a popular British brand offering pre-shredded suet (the hard fat around the kidneys). As suet most commonly needs to be shredded in its typical uses in British cuisine (e.g. in pie crusts, steamed puddings, and dumplings), Atora can be seen as a labour-saving convenience item. Atora only uses suet from cattle and sheep.

Atora is also available in a vegetable fat-based version labeled "vegetable suet".

== History ==
In the past, it was common to be able to find blocks of suet at grocery shops; however, it was not until 1893 that the first pre-shredded suet became available. This was the brainchild of Gabriel Hugon, a Frenchman living in Manchester. He observed his wife struggling to cut blocks of suet in the kitchen and set about to create ready-shredded suet.

== Etymology ==
Hugon named his product "Atora", deriving the name from "toro", the Spanish word for bull. To reinforce this connection, prior to the Second World War, the suet was transported around the country in painted wagons pulled by six pairs of Hereford bulls.

== Ownership ==
In 1974 production was moved from the factory in Ogden Lane, Openshaw, Manchester to another site at Greatham, near Hartlepool. Production at Greatham ended around 2002–2003.

In 1963, Rank Hovis McDougall acquired the Atora brand, and it subsequently became part of Premier Foods in March 2007, along with the rest of their assets.
