= Be-Ro =

Food Manufacturing Company

- Type: Private
- Industry: Food Manufacturing; Flour Milling; Recipes
- Founded: 1875
- Headquarters: St Albans, England, United Kingdom
- Key people: Thomas Bell, Founder, Inventor
- Products: Bells Royal Flours, Baking Powder and wholesale. Be-Ro Flours and other food produce.
- Parent: Premier Foods
- Website: www.be-ro.co.uk

Be-Ro is a food manufacturing business, formerly based in Newcastle upon Tyne.

== History ==
The company was founded by Thomas Bell as a grocery and tea company in Longhorsley north of Newcastle in 1875. Bell had experimented with rising agents on flour in baking and, from that, produced the world's first self-raising flour. He founded the Bells Royal works which sold the Bell's Royal Flour. In 1907, Bell renamed his product "Be-Ro", a portmanteau of "Bell" and "Royal", and registered the new name under the Trade Marks Act 1905. He started in his own right in small premises in the yard of the Black Boy Hotel adjoining the Groat Market in the centre of Newcastle. As well as manufacturing baking powder and self-raising flour, he produced a health salt which he later discontinued. He also packed and marketed dried fruit, cereals, tea and coffee using such names as T.B. Royalty, Black Diamond, and Belsun.

The company then moved into larger premises in Low Friar street and, after that, to Bath Lane. Thomas Bell died in 1925 and his descendants continued to expand the area covered by the company to include Carlisle and the whole of County Durham as well as Teesside. Depots were later built at Leeds, Edinburgh, Sheffield, and Birmingham, and in 1931 they decided upon Nottingham as a base from which to expand into the Midlands. Several dozen more depots were either built, bought or rented throughout England and Scotland.

In 1958, Rank-Hovis Ltd acquired the business, which then became part of the newly formed RHM in 1961. RHM was taken over by Premier Foods in March 2007, making Be-Ro a Premier Foods brand.

When Be-Ro introduced its self-raising flour, it also created a recipe book to promote the use of this new product. The recipe book is still sold today, and is currently in its 41st edition, having sold over 40 million copies.
