= Premier Foods =

British food manufacturer

Premier Foods plc
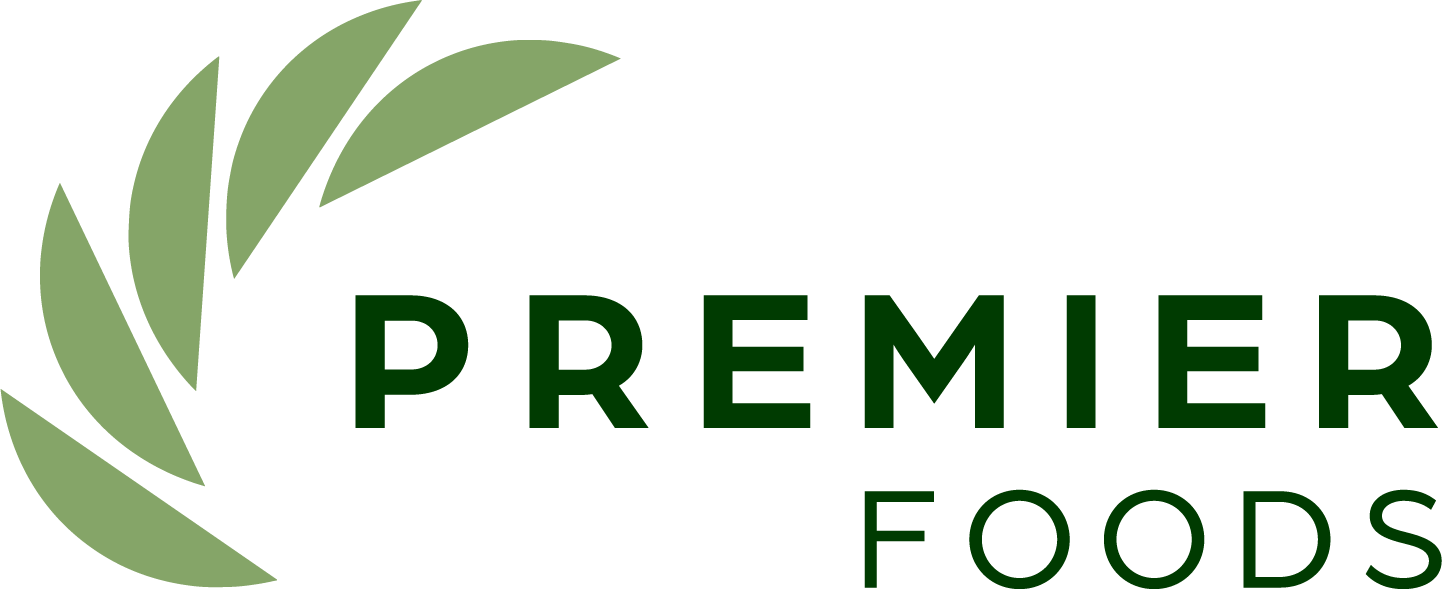

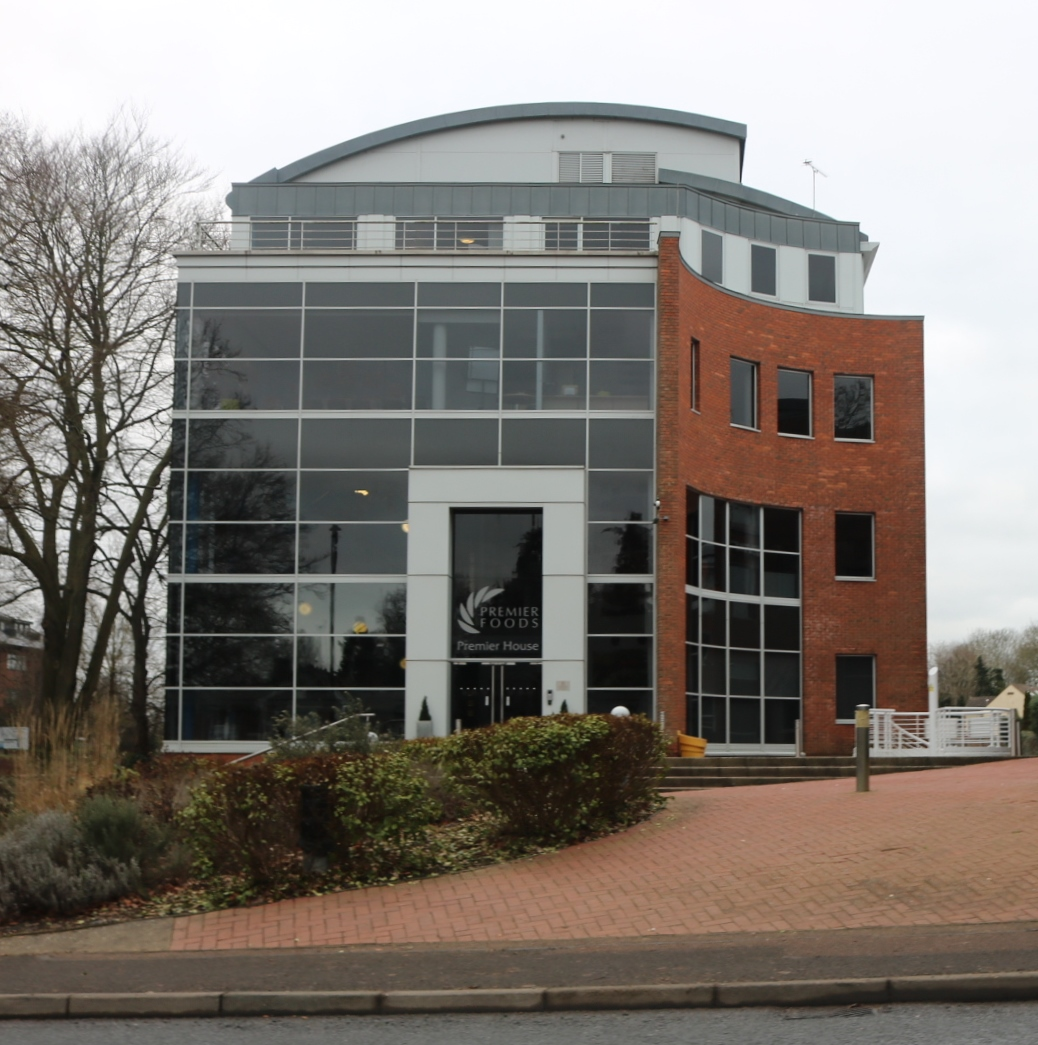
- Headquarters in St. Albans, UK
- Type: Public
- Traded as: LSE: PFD; FTSE 250 component
- ISIN: GB00B7N0K053
- Industry: Food Manufacturing
- Predecessor: Rank Hovis McDougall
- Founded: 1975 (as Hillsdown Holdings)
- Headquarters: St. Albans, Hertfordshire, United Kingdom
- Key people: Colin Day, (Chairman); Alex Whitehouse, (CEO)
- Products: Foods
- Revenue: ▲£1,175.5 million (2026)
- Operating income: ▲£200.8 million (2026)
- Net income: ▲£136.6 million (2026)
- Website: premierfoods.co.uk

Premier Foods plc is a British food manufacturer headquartered in St Albans, Hertfordshire. The group owns many well-known brands, including Mr Kipling, Ambrosia, Bird's Custard, Angel Delight, Homepride cooking sauces, Lyons, Sharwood's, Loyd Grossman sauces, Oxo, Bisto, Batchelors, Vesta meals and Plantastic. Premier Foods also produce cakes under the Cadbury's name, using the brand under licence. It is listed on the London Stock Exchange and is a constituent of the FTSE 250 Index.

== History ==
=== Formation ===
The company was founded by Harry Solomon and David Thompson in London in 1975 as Hillsdown Holdings. The name came from Thompson's house, Hillsdown. His son Richard Thompson worked for his father after his education at Haileybury. In 1981 it acquired Lockwood Foods Ltd which was in administrative receivership. In May 1987, David Thompson stepped down from Hillsdown Holdings, selling 50% of his shares and became a non executive director. In April 1989 he sold all of his shares.

In 1986, it bought various food businesses from Beechams and in 1990 it acquired Premier Brands, the MBO led by Paul Judge of Cadbury Schweppes' Foods and Other Products divisions which included Typhoo and Cadbury's drinks.

It was bought by the private equity company Hicks, Muse, Tate and Furst in 1999. In 2002, it bought Nestlé's ambient foods business. It was first listed on the London Stock Exchange in 2004.

=== Expansion ===
In 2004, it acquired the Ambrosia custard and rice pudding brand from the Colman's division of Unilever.

In February 2005, Premier Foods acquired Kraft Foods' ambient desserts businesses including Bird's Custard and Angel Delight.

In June 2005, Marlow Foods, makers of Quorn, was purchased and this was followed in October by the acquisition of Cauldron, consolidating the two leading brands in the meat-free category. That month, Premier Foods announced the sale of Typhoo tea to India's Apeejay Surrendra Group for $140 million. Immediately after the sale, The Sirhowy Group confirmed it had acquired a 2% stake in Premier Foods, supporting the company's strategy to make debt reduction a priority.

In 2006, Premier Foods acquired the UK and Ireland businesses of Campbell's for £460 million. Brands included in the deal were Oxo, Batchelors, Homepride and Fray Bentos. The iconic Campbell's Soup cans had to be rebranded as Batchelors Condensed Soup (as the brand itself was not acquired) but labels still carried the label "Formerly Campbell's. Same great taste." Similarly, Campbell's Meatballs were rebranded as Fray Bentos Meatballs. Subsequently, in December 2007, the closure of the King's Lynn depot where Fray Bentos pies were made was announced.

In March 2007, Premier Foods completed the takeover of its rival Rank Hovis McDougall (RHM) for £1.2 billion.

In July 2007, Premier Foods announced it would close several RHM sites: Bristol, Droylsden (makers of Robertson's Golden Shred since 1890 and Sharwood's brands), Middlewich (makers of Bisto and Salts), Wythenshawe (makers of Sharwood's pappadoms and Paxo), Ledbury (makers of specialist jams) and Reading (Foodservices).

In 2008 the company re-launched the Hovis brand by commissioning Go On Lad, a retrospective advertisement which was voted "Advert of the Decade" by the British public in December 2009.

In 2009, Premier Foods sold its frozen bakery business, including Le Pain Croustillant and Sofrapain, to Nutrixo.

=== Restructuring ===
In February 2011, Premier Foods sold its Crosse & Blackwell, Fray Bentos and Smedley's businesses to Princes for £182 million. It followed this in March with the sale of Marlow Foods to Exponent Private Equity and Intermediate Capital Group for £205 million ($331.6 million), resulting in the creation of a new company, Quorn Foods. Premier Foods said the deal was part of a strategy to reduce its debt, which built up following an acquisition spree that included Hovis-owner RHM and Campbell's Soup in the UK and Ireland. 2 Sisters Food Group bought Premier Foods' Brookes Avana business in December 2011.

In 2012, the company announced it had agreed a re-financing package, which required the disposal of additional assets. Premier Foods reached agreements with Mizkan to sell its Haywards pickle, Sarson's and Dufrais vinegar in June, followed by Branston in October that year. In August, the company sold its sweet spreads and jellies division, including Hartley's jam, Sun-Pat peanut butter and Robertson's, to Hain Celestial Group.

In January 2014, Premier Foods announced a new capital structure for the business which included an underwritten equity issue of approximately £353 million, a new pension schemes agreement, a high yield bond of £500 million and a new lending agreement with a smaller banking group. Premier also became a 'grocery-only' business with the movement of the Hovis brand into a joint venture with US-based venture capital fund The Gores Group. Premier Foods sold a controlling 51% stake in the joint venture to The Gores Group, which saw Hovis become a private company.

The Hovis spin-off was followed in June 2014 by the announcement that the company would spin off its powdered food and drinks manufacturing operations in Knighton into a joint venture called Knighton Foods. Premier Foods sold a controlling 51% stake in the venture to Specialty Powders Holdings.

In December 2014 it was reported that the company was charging suppliers for the right to sell goods and services to Premier Foods. One supplier said the practice – known as pay and stay – was like "blackmail". Premier Foods said it was confident the scheme did not break any rules under competition law.

In November 2015 the group announced a new partnership with celebrity baker Paul Hollywood to produce a range of bread, savoury and sweet mixes, designed to make artisanal baking accessible to consumers.

The company announced a partnership with the Japanese company Nissin Foods in March 2016, whereby the companies would distribute each other's products in their home markets. Premier Foods also revealed it had rejected an unsolicited takeover approach from McCormick & Company. Nissin subsequently purchased a 17.3% stake in the company. McCormick dropped its takeover bid in April 2016.

== Brands ==
The company's brands include:

- Ambrosia custards and rice pudding
- Angel Delight desserts
- Atora shredded suet
- Batchelors dehydrated foods, Super Noodles and dried soup Cup-a-Soup
- Be-Ro flour
- Bird's custard and desserts
- Bisto gravy
- Cadbury cakes and cake mixes (manufactured under licence from Mondelez International)
- FUEL10K cereal, granola and porridge
- Homepride cooking sauces and ready meals (businesses only)
- Loyd Grossman sauces cooking sauces
- Lyons cakes and baked goods
- Marvel milk powder
- McDougalls flour
- Merchant Gourmet pulses and grains
- Mr Kipling cakes and cake mixes
- Nissin noodle pots and blocks (distributed under licence from Nissin Food Holdings Co Ltd)
- Oxo stocks and seasonings
- Paxo stuffing
- Peckish rice crackers (under licence)
- Plantastic health foods
- Saxa salt and pepper
- Sharwood's Asian cooking sauces
- Smash instant mash potato
- The Spice Tailor by Anjum Anand

== Animal welfare ==
In 2025, Premier Foods was awarded a 'Tier 2' status by the Business Benchmark on Farm Animal Welfare (BBFAW). This designation signifies that the company achieved a score of between 62–80% on the BBFAW criteria. The benchmarking assesses areas such as management commitment, formal policy and objectives, and animal welfare performance. Achieving Tier 2 indicates that Premier Foods has made substantial progress in implementing robust farm animal welfare policies and practices.
