= Batchelors =

British brand of dried food products

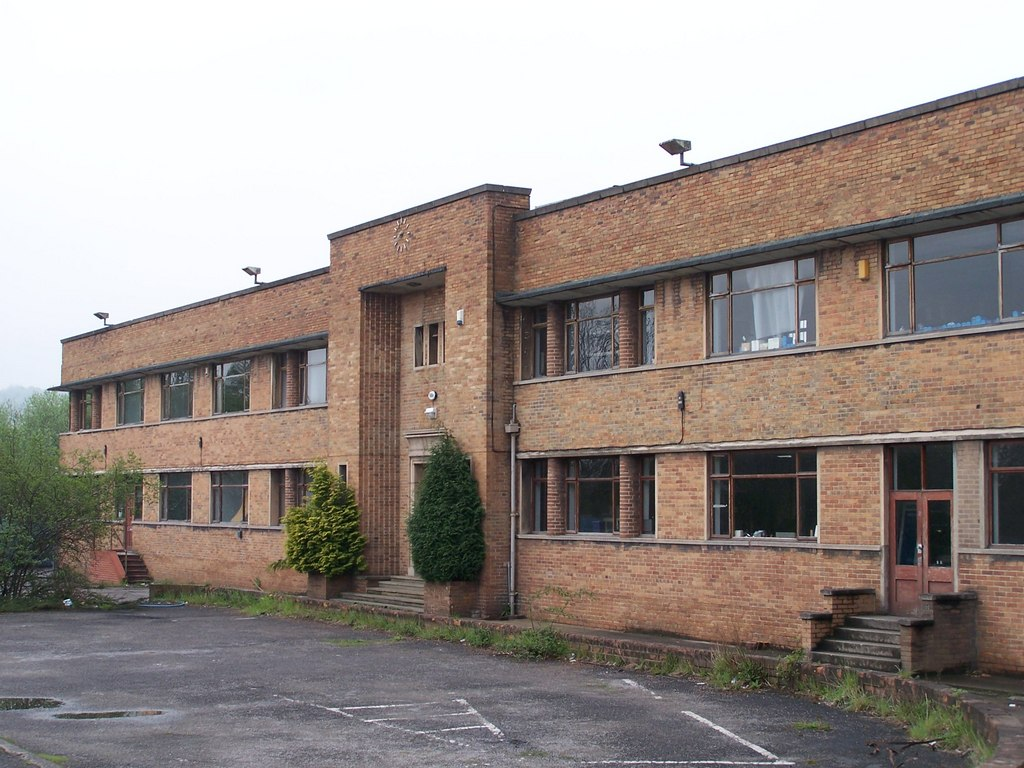
- Former Batchelors Foods Factory, Limestone Cottage Lane, Sheffield
- Product type: Food
- Current owner: Premier Foods (UK); Valeo Foods (Ireland)
- Country: United Kingdom
- Introduced: 1895; 131 years ago
- Markets: UK and Ireland
- Previous owners: Unilever; Best Foods
- Website: www.batchelorsrange.co.uk (UK) www.batchelors.ie (Ireland)

Batchelors is a brand of predominantly dried food products owned by Premier Foods. The Batchelors company was founded in 1895 in Sheffield, England by William Batchelor, initially specialising in canned vegetables. It began selling dried soup in 1949, and Cup-a-Soup range in 1972. The company now makes pasta and rice dishes such as Pasta 'n' Sauce and Super Rice along with instant soup, in particular Cup-a-Soup and noodle products such as Super Noodles.

Since early 2008, the Batchelors name has also been applied to Premier Foods' condensed soup range, previously sold as Campbell's. The Campbell's brand returned to the UK in 2011, after a five-year non-compete agreement expired.

== History ==
William Batchelor was born in Habrough, Lincolnshire, in 1860 to Ellen, née Hudson, and James Batchelor, a farmworker who later had his own farm. William discovered a way to can vegetables such as processed peas and formed Batchelors Foods in 1895. He died in 1913 and his daughter Ella (who became Ella Gasking) at the age of 22 took over the company. In 1937, Gasking opened a factory at Wadsley Bridge, Sheffield in 1937 at a cost of £100,000 to build. It was the largest canning plant in Britain, covering 12 acres including playing fields & speaker radios for staff. In 1943 Gasking was awarded an OBE in recognition of her contribution to the war effort and the grocery industry.

In 1935 an Irish version of the brand was launched, but the soup was called "McDonnells" in Ireland.

In 1943, due to issues with staffing and rationing, the company was bought by James Van den Bergh of Unilever, where it became part of Van den Bergh Foods, later based in Crawley. In 1948, Gasking retired and her younger brother Maurice Batchelor took over. The company took over Poulton and Noel, another soup company. In 1949, the first dried soup, chicken noodle flavour, was sold. In 1972, Cup-a-Soup was launched.

In 1961, Batchelors launched "Vesta" instant dried curry. Along with other ready meals when they first entered the market, this was initially regarded as exotic. The product was heavily advertised through to the 1980s as a tasty full meal that could be ready in 20 minutes. The resulting curry was later described in The Guardian as "suspiciously shiny brown goo". In 1982, the novelist Sue Townsend made her schoolboy character Adrian Mole eat the product, only to be mocked for it by an Indian neighbour.

In January 2001, Unilever took over Bestfoods. To be allowed to take over the American company, Unilever had to sell off some brands for monopoly regulation. It sold off Batchelors and Oxo to the UK subsidiary of Campbell's.

Unilever retained ownership of the Cup-a-Soup brand in America and Australia, rebranding it under Lipton and Continental respectively.

In 2006, Campbell's soup withdrew from the UK market, and sold its assets, including Batchelors, to Premier Foods. The Campbell's name was licensed to Premier Foods until 2008, following which Campbell's Soup was rebranded as Batchelors.

In 2008, Batchelors was rebranded with a new logo.
