= Instant pudding =

Powder used to create puddings and pie filling

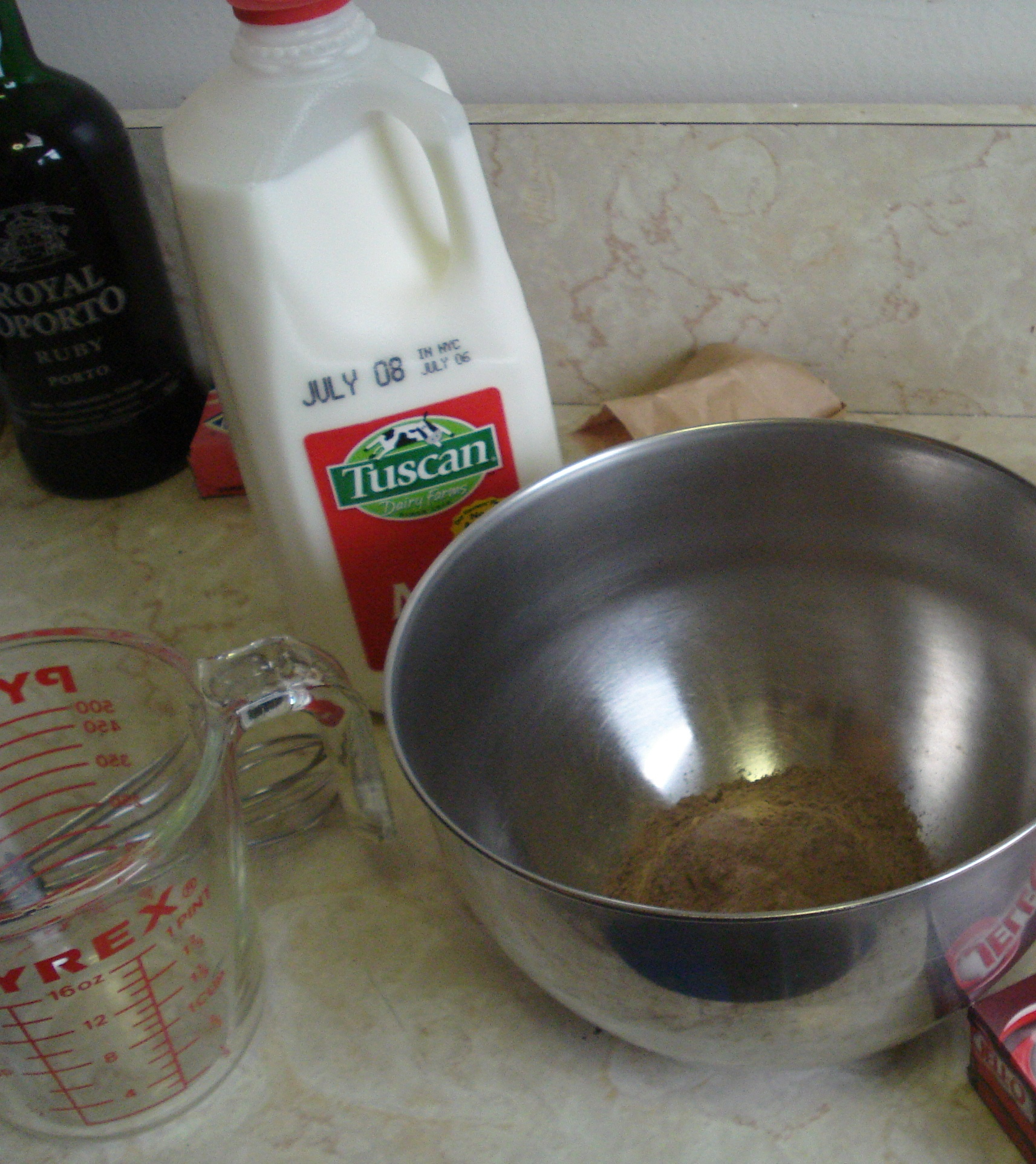
Instant chocolate pudding mix, milk and a measuring cup

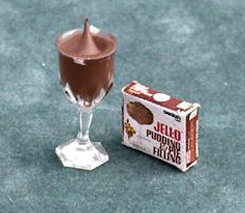
Instant dessert pudding

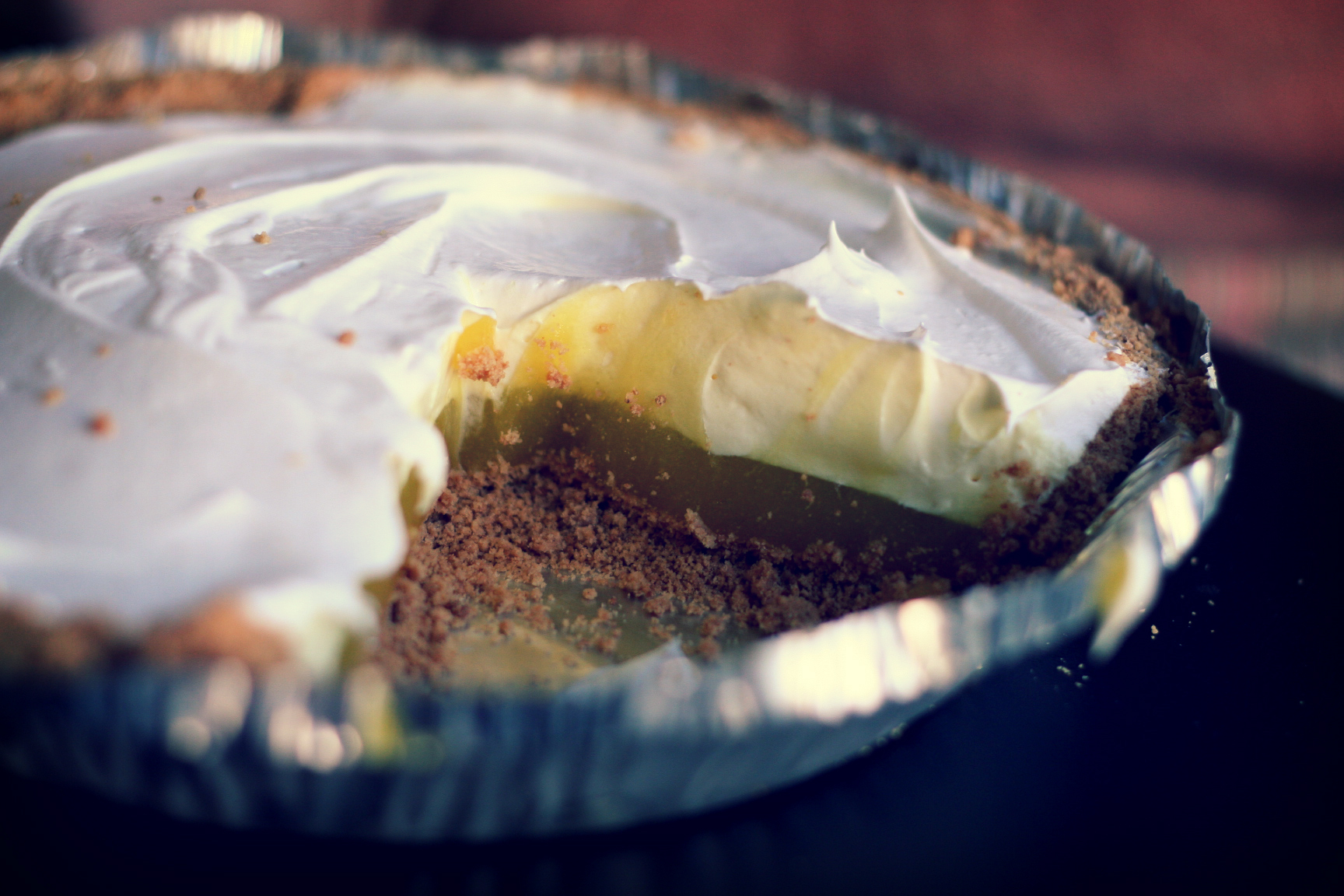
A lemon pie prepared with lemon-flavored instant pudding mix (middle layer), whipped cream and a graham cracker crust

Instant pudding is an instant food product that is manufactured in a powder form and used to create puddings and pie filling. It is produced using sugar, flavoring agents and thickeners as primary ingredients. Instant pudding can be used in some baked goods.

== Manufacturing ==
Many flavors of instant pudding are produced. Sugar, a flavoring agent, and thickeners are primary ingredients. Instant chocolate pudding mix is manufactured using cocoa. A key ingredient in instant pudding is gelatinized starch, a dried instant starch that readily absorbs liquids, which causes the pudding to gel when mixed with milk. Additional ingredients sometimes used as a thickener include gums that are soluble in cold water, such as carrageenans and alginates. Phosphate salts are sometimes used, which contribute to the gelling of the finished product. Some Jell-O brand instant puddings are vegan, such as those in vanilla, lemon, banana crème, and pistachio flavors.

Many flavors of instant pudding are produced, with manufacturers including Kraft Foods and Jel Sert whose products are marketed under the Jell-O and Royal brand names.

=== Nutrition information ===
One serving (one-quarter of a box) of dry Jell-O chocolate-flavored instant pudding contains 110 calories, 430 mg sodium, 8 g carbohydrate, 18 g sugars, and 1 g of dietary fiber. It also contains 4% of the daily Recommended Dietary Allowance of iron. Instant pudding mixes are produced in non-fat and sugar-free varieties.

== Preparation ==
Instant pudding is typically prepared by combining the powdered mix with milk and mixing the ingredients. Puddings may be cooled in a refrigerator before serving.

== Uses ==
In addition to being eaten as-is and used as a pie filling, instant pudding can be used in baked goods such as cakes and cookies. Instant pudding added to cake mix can result in a denser and moister cake compared to cakes prepared without it. The use of instant pudding can cause a cake to fall or shrink as it cools, more than a cake prepared without the pudding. Use of a small amount of instant pudding lessens shrinkage compared to using a whole box. Cookies prepared using instant pudding may be moister compared to those without it.

== See also ==
- Angel Delight – a brand of powdered instant dessert mix
- Bird's Custard – a brand of powdered instant custard mix
- List of puddings
