= Mr Kipling =

British brand of cakes and baked goods

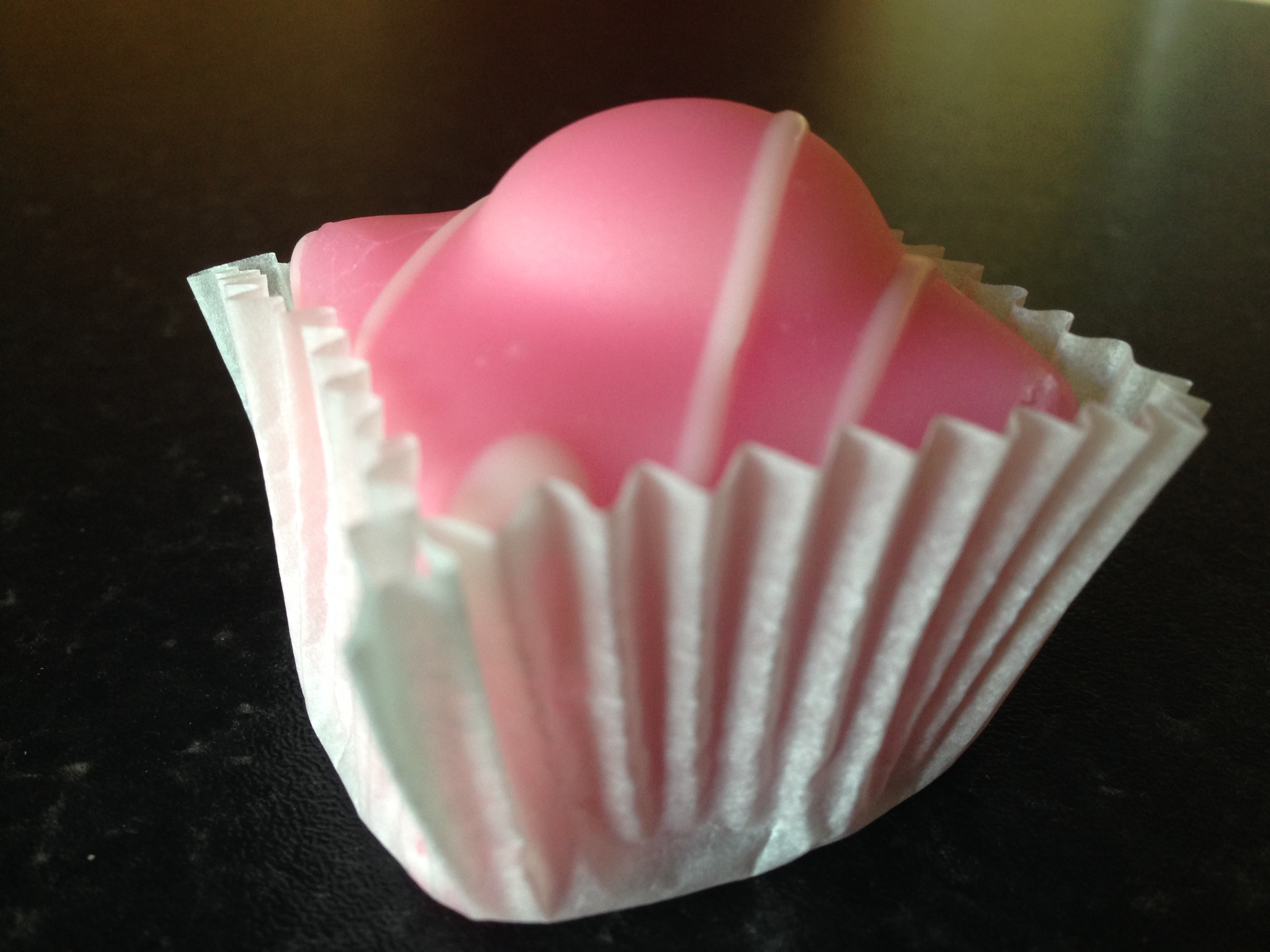
- A pink Mr Kipling French Fancy cake
- Product type: Cakes
- Current owner: Premier Foods
- Country: United Kingdom
- Introduced: 1967
- Markets: UK, Ireland, Australia, New Zealand, North America
- Previous owners: Joseph Marassery (RHM)
- Website: mrkipling.co.uk

Mr Kipling is a brand of cakes, pies and baked goods made in Carlton, South Yorkshire and Stoke-on-Trent, and marketed in the United Kingdom, Ireland, Australia and North America. It was introduced in May 1967 (at a time when cakes were more often bought from local bakers), to sell cakes of a local baker's standard to supermarkets, and grew to become the United Kingdom's largest cake manufacturer by 1976.

Since making its first television appearance in a UK advert, the slogan for Mr Kipling in its home market has been "exceedingly good cakes", which originally featured the deep, rich narration of actor James Hayter. Mr Kipling's Cakes were made by the RHM subsidiary known as Manor Bakeries Ltd. which also produced products under the Lyons and Cadbury names. The Cadbury cakes are produced under licence from Cadbury, the owners of the brand name.

== Branding ==
The brand was created in the 1960s by Rank Hovis McDougall, which wanted to boost cake sales and utilise a new bakery. The brand was launched in 1967 and included 20 products sold in premium boxes. The name, Mr. Kipling, was invented for marketing purposes.

With advertising using the slogan "exceedingly good cakes", and television adverts which originally featured the voice of actor James Hayter, the brand had become the market leader in the United Kingdom by 1976, a position it still holds over forty years later. Varieties of single-serving and individually wrapped cakes have also been marketed.

Mr Kipling cakes and pies (from top to bottom in the middle) on sale in Tesco supermarket in the UK. The slogan "Exceedingly good cakes" appears with each Mr Kipling product.

Around 2005, the manufacturers briefly experimented with another new logo and a striking pack design: pack-fronts simply consisting of the words "Mr Kipling", the name of the cake, and the phrase "Exceedingly good cakes" in a more formal, classic typeface; the only image of the cake on each pack-front was a close-up of one part of it, used as a background image for the entire pack. Around the same time, the write-ups on the back of their packaging once again purported to be written by the person of Mr Kipling. Shortly afterwards, however, the pack design and brand image wholeheartedly returned to its roots. The logo introduced at the time was very closely based on the original one, featuring a traditional-style font in a gold-edged shape, the packs feature images of the cake(s), and various product features and write-ups are featured on the pack-front.

Premier Foods also introduced what it termed 'Snap Pack' packaging (now renamed 'Snack Pack'), providing cakes in individually sealed plastic packs to keep them fresh. It quickly became a top-seller for the brand. Beginning in 2018, Mr Kipling has released a line of Roald Dahl-themed cakes, each based on characters from his children's stories, including a Witches-inspired Halloween special.

In 2018, the brand redesigned their packaging for the North American and Australian markets. The new design aimed for a more contemporary and distinctive look to attract new customers, steering away from Mr. Kipling's heritage. However, Mr. Kipling's wordmark logo remained the same. Furthermore, the brand's UK slogan "exceedingly good cakes" was replaced with "make every day delicious" for the international market.

== Products ==
Mr Kipling Viennese whirl

Mr Kipling's signature product range includes:

=== Slices ===
- Almond slices
- Carrot cake slices
- Angel slices
- Lemon layered slices
- Bakewell slices
- Chocolate slices
- Country slices
- Unicorn slices
- Trifle tarts (since 1990)
- Victoria slices
- Banana (Minion) slices

=== Pies and tarts ===
- Bramley apple and blackcurrant pies
- Bramley apple pies
- Mini fruit pie selections
- Cherry bakewells
- Mini bakewells selections
- Jam tarts
- Mini sponge tart selections

=== Goodies ===
- French fancies
- Lemon fancies

=== Biscuits ===
- Viennese whirls

=== Cakes ===
- Manor house cake
- Battenberg
- Mini battenbergs

== French Fancies ==
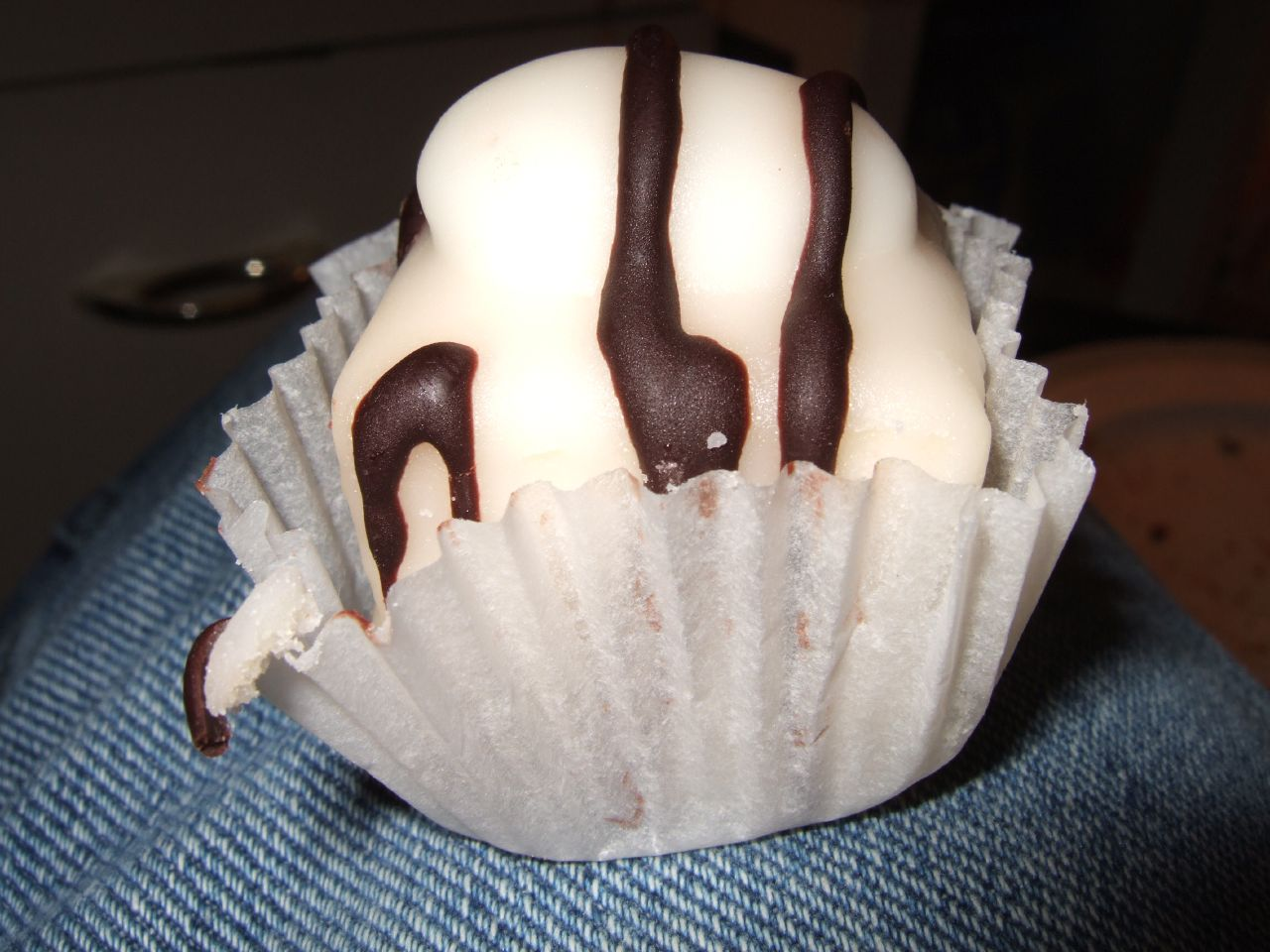
Mr Kipling French Fancy

Mr Kipling French Fancies are small sponge cakes, topped with a hemisphere of vegetable-oil "buttercream". The cakes are coated with fondant icing, with several varieties drizzled with a second colour. Standard varieties are pink ("vanilla") with white drizzle, yellow ("lemon") with brown drizzle, and brown (chocolate) with dark brown drizzle.

While cocoa is cited in the ingredients list, strawberry and lemon are not. The cakes are 30% sugar. French Fancies were among the 20 varieties of cake that were part of the initial Mr Kipling launch in 1967.

In September 2008, Mr Kipling announced the Big French Fancy, a large cake which can be sliced into portions. A limited edition appeared in 2012, renamed British Fancies, containing cakes in red, white and blue. Supermarket and home-made copies are called Fondant Fancies, which featured on The Great British Bake Off (including Paul Hollywood’s Raspberry & Almond Fondant Fancies from series 16).

== See also ==
- Petit four, small bite-sized cakes
