= Saxa (food product) =

Brand of salt

Saxa salt

Saxa is a brand of vinegar, herbs, spices, salt and pepper in the United Kingdom, Ireland and Australia that was introduced in 1907. Formerly a brand of Rank Hovis McDougall it became property of Premier Foods in 2007. As a result of the change, production of Saxa salt was moved from Middlewich in Cheshire, a traditional centre of the British salt industry, to factories at Worksop and Ashford, Kent.

Saxa has been described by The Independent as one of "Britain's best-known food brands." and in the Journal of Consumer Marketing, Mats Urde lists it alongside Bisto and Hovis.

In Australia, Saxa brand is owned by Kraft Heinz which acquired most of Cerebos Pacific assets in 2018.
