= Oxo (food) =

Food ingredient brand

OXO

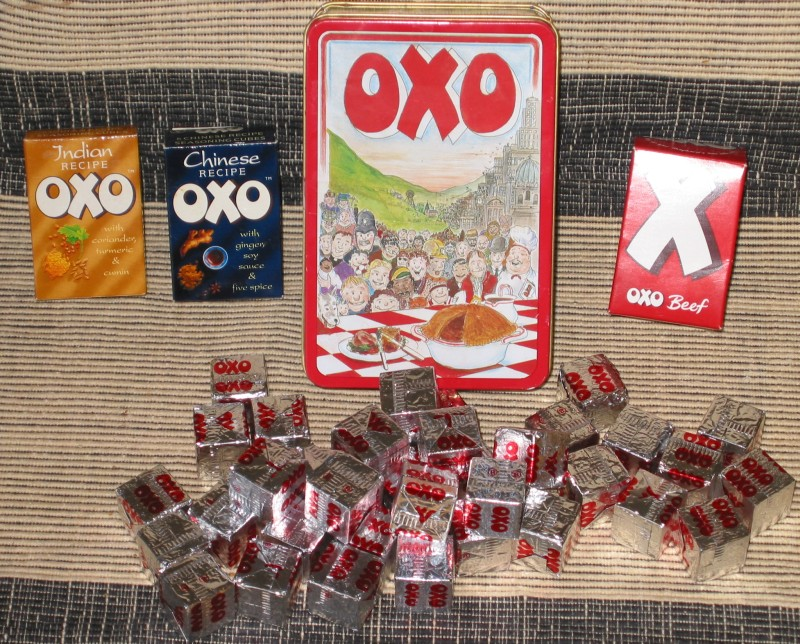
- Types of OXO cube
- Product type: Food
- Current owner: Premier Foods (United Kingdom); Mars, Incorporated (South Africa); Knorr (Canada)
- Country: United Kingdom
- Introduced: Ireland
- Website: www.oxo.co.uk

Oxo (stylized OXO) is a brand of food products, including stock cubes, herbs and spices, dried gravy, and yeast extract. The original product was the beef stock cube, and the company now also markets chicken and other flavour cubes, including versions with Chinese and Indian spices. The cubes are broken up and used as flavouring in meals or gravy or dissolved into boiling water to produce a bouillon.

In the United Kingdom, the OXO brand belongs to Premier Foods. In South Africa, the Oxo brand is owned and manufactured by Mars, Incorporated and in Canada is owned and manufactured by Knorr.

== History ==
Around 1840, Justus von Liebig developed a concentrated meat extract. Liebig's Extract of Meat Company (Lemco; established in the United Kingdom) promoted it, starting in 1866. The original product was a viscous liquid, containing only meat extract and 4% salt. In 1899, the company introduced the trademark Oxo; the origin of the name is unknown, but presumably comes from the word "ox." Since the cost of liquid Oxo remained beyond the reach of many families, the company launched a research project to develop a solid version that could be sold in cubes for a penny. After much research, Oxo produced their first cubes in 1910 and further increased Oxo's popularity. During World War I, 100 million Oxo cubes were provided to the British armed forces, all of them individually hand-wrapped.

The Vestey Group acquired Lemco in 1924, and the factory was renamed El Anglo. Vestey merged with Brooke Bond in 1968, which was in turn acquired by Unilever in 1984. Unilever sold the Oxo brand to Campbell's in 2001, and Premier Foods bought Campbell's UK operation in 2006. This sale included sites at both Worksop and Kings Lynn. The Worksop plant currently produces Oxo cubes.

In South Africa, Oxo is now a brand of Mars, Incorporated. The only product marketed under the Oxo brand in South Africa was a yeast-extract-based spread. The product also contained a small portion of beef extract, giving it a slightly "beefier" taste than other yeast extracts. At the beginning of 2015, Mars Consumer Products Africa (Pty), Ltd discontinued Oxo spread in South Africa, with no prior communication to the public.

== Marketing ==
In 1908, Oxo (alongside Odol mouthwash and Indian Foot Powder) was one of the sponsors of the London Olympic Games (despite claims by Coca-Cola of being the "first" commercial sponsor of the games) and supplied marathon runners with Oxo drinks "to fortify them." During the first half of the 20th century, Oxo was promoted through the issue of recipes, gifts, and sponsorships, before fading into the background as a part of the fabric of English life in the latter parts of the century.

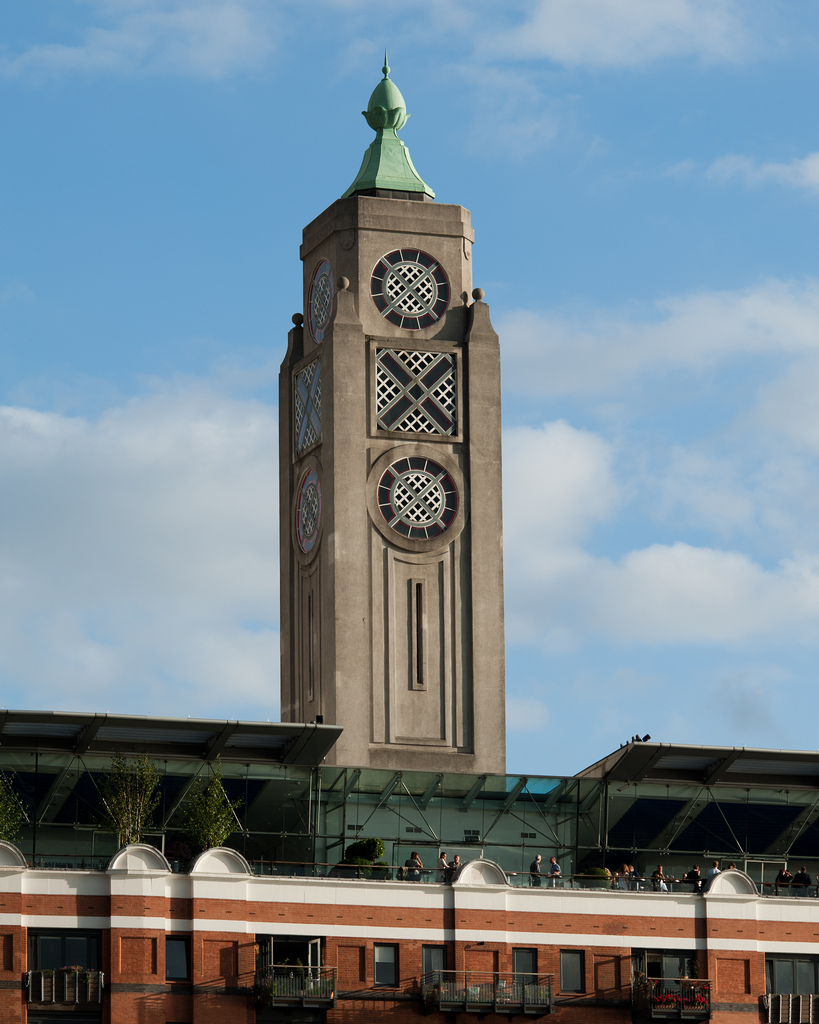
Oxo Tower, London

In the 1920s, the Liebig's Extract of Meat Company acquired a wharf on the south bank of the river Thames in London. There they erected a factory, demolishing most of the original building and constructing a tower, with distinctive windows appearing to spell out 'OXO', which became known as the Oxo Tower

In 1958, Oxo commenced their longest running television advertising campaign, "Life with Katie." Katie was played by Mary Holland, and her long-suffering husband by Peter Moynihan. The campaign ran until the early 1970s, including two seasons where the family traveled to the US to film. By this time, the couple were joined by their "son."

As styles and tastes changed, Oxo moved to a more up-to-date format with Dennis Waterman as the sole face of the brand in the mid '70s.

In 1966, Oxo had a sponsored show on the offshore radio station, Wonderful Radio London. The show was presented by Tony Windsor; his assistant was a woman called "Katie." Oxo presented a new recipe in each episode.

Oxo launched another long-running advertising campaign in the UK in 1983, when a second "Oxo Family" debuted on commercial television. The father was played by Michael Redfern, the mother was played by Lynda Bellingham, while the children were played by Blair MacKichan, Colin McCoy and Alison Reynolds. The advertisements typically featured the family sitting down to a meal at which Oxo gravy would be served. The product was not always mentioned by name, occasionally appearing only as a logo in the corner of the screen at the end of the commercial. Throughout the 1980s and 1990s, the family were seen to grow older, and, when the campaign was retired in 1999, the family moved out of the house.

Oxo is mentioned in XTC’s “The Everyday Story of Smalltown” from their 1984 album The Big Express.

On 11 November 2014, it was announced that a 1984 Oxo advert starring Lynda Bellingham would be screened on Christmas Day as a tribute to the actress, who had died of colon cancer the previous month. It was aired during a commercial break of Coronation Street.

== See also ==
- Bovril
- Oxo Tower
