= Paxo =

British stuffing brand

Paxo is a brand of stuffing and bread crumbs in the United Kingdom, currently owned by Premier Foods.

Paxo was devised in 1901 by John Crampton, a butcher from Eccles near Manchester, who wanted to have something extra to sell to his customers shopping for their Sunday lunch menus.

In the beginning sales growth of Paxo was slow because stuffing is mainly served with chickens and poultry was then traditionally regarded as a luxury. As the price of chickens dropped and that of red meats rose in the 1950s and 1960s, Paxo's popularity grew.

At Christmas, the product is advertised with the slogan "Christmas wouldn't be Christmas without the Paxo" (a play on the phrase "Christmas wouldn't be Christmas without the turkey").

Paxo was manufactured from the early 1950s in Sharston, Manchester, until 2009 when the factory was closed and production moved to the re-opened Bachelor's factory in Ashford, Kent.
