= Sharwood's =

British company owned by Premier Foods

- Type: Food
- Industry: Food Manufacture
- Founded: 1889
- Founder: James Allen Sharwood
- Headquarters: United Kingdom
- Products: Asian cooking sauces, accompaniments and ingredients.
- Parent: Premier Foods
- Website: http:www.sharwoods.co.uk

Sharwood's is a British food company, which specialises in Asian food, established in 1889 by James Allen Sharwood and acquired by RHM in 1963, which was then merged into Premier Foods in March 2007.

== Company products ==
Sharwood's Mango Chutney & Kashmiri Chilli sauce

The company produces Chinese, Indian and Thai food products and ingredients. It produces many cooking sauces, which usually come in a recognisable square jar, and also curry pastes and powders, pappadoms, naan breads, noodles, prawn crackers and ready meals. It holds the largest market share in Britain in this range. The sauces are made at the Worksop Factory in north Nottinghamshire.

== Media ==
Sharwood brand noodles

In August 2010 Sharwood's teamed up with actor and personality Joanna Lumley to develop a limited edition Mango Chutney with Kashmiri Chilli – an ingredient from her birthplace. Sharwood's pledged to donate 10p from each jar sold to the Gurkha Welfare Trust.

In 2012, Sharwood's released an extended range to complement its tikka masala sauce; these are "Extra Mild", "Extra Creamy", "Extra Onions" and "Mango Chutney flavour".

In addition to the UK, Sharwood's products are available in Australia, New Zealand, and North America.
