= Inside the Factory =

UK television programme (2015–)

- Genre: Documentary
- Presented by: Gregg Wallace (2015–2024); Paddy McGuinness; Cherry Healey; Ruth Goodman
- Country of origin: United Kingdom
- Original language: English
- No. of series: 10 (+ 1 mini-series)
- No. of episodes: 78

Production
- Producer: Amanda Lyon
- Running time: 60 minutes
- Production company: Voltage TV

Original release
- Network: BBC Two
- Release: 5 May 2015 – present

Inside the Factory is a British television series produced by Voltage TV for the BBC. The first episode was broadcast on BBC Two on 5 May 2015. Each episode explores how a specific product is made inside a factory. The 2024 series is presented by Paddy McGuinness, Cherry Healey and historian Ruth Goodman who provides a look at how products came to exist as we know them today.

Initially both Gregg Wallace and Healey visited the factories together, but since the Christmas special of 2017, each of the three presenters are in separate locations, forming different segments of the programme.

Wallace, who presented the programme from its first episode, announced in 2023 that he was leaving the programme, with his last episode airing as the eighth series finale in 2024.

On 22 August 2023, it was announced that Paddy McGuinness would be the new presenter, replacing Wallace for the ninth series in 2024.

== Episodes ==
=== Series 1 (2015) ===
Episode	Title	Original airdate	Viewers (millions)
1	Bread	5 May 2015	2.35
Gregg and Cherry visit the Kingsmill factory in West Bromwich to learn the secrets of how they make bread. Cherry looks at how to make your bread last longer and Ruth shows what hidden items used to be found in bread.
2	Chocolate	6 May 2015	2.45
Gregg visits the Nestlé factory in York and Cherry visits the Thorntons factory in Derbyshire to learn the secrets of how they make chocolate. Ruth meets some people who used to work on the first chocolate production lines.
3	Milk	7 May 2015	2.54
Gregg and Cherry visit the Arla Aylesbury factory in Buckinghamshire to learn the secrets of how they process milk, Cherry also learns how cheese is produced and visits Unilever Gloucester to learn how they make ice cream. Ruth investigates the history of milk.

=== Series 2 (2016) ===
Episode	Title	Original airdate	Viewers (millions)
1	Cereal	26 July 2016	2.43
Gregg and Cherry visit the Kellogg's factory in Manchester to learn the secrets of how they make cereal, specifically Crunchy Nut Corn Flakes. Cherry also visits the Weetabix factory, looks at how wheat is grown and how they add additional vitamins and minerals to cereals. Ruth looks at what people used to eat for breakfast before cereal was invented.
2	Crisps	2 August 2016	3.07
Gregg and Cherry visit the Walkers factory in Leicester to learn the secrets of how they make crisps, specifically Cheese and Onion. Cherry looks at what makes a perfect potato for making crisps and how your brain can be tricked into thinking you are eating something different. Ruth looks at who invented crisps.
3	Baked Beans	9 August 2016	2.77
Gregg and Cherry visit the H. J. Heinz, Wigan factory to learn the secrets of how they make baked beans. Cherry looks at how cans are recycled and Ruth looks at the history behind canned food.
4	Bicycles	16 August 2016	1.83
Gregg and Cherry visit the Brompton factory in West London to learn the secrets of how they make folding bicycles. Cherry gets tips from Team GB to improve her cycling speed and she also learns how bicycles are painted to cope with adverse weather. Ruth looks at important moments in history that used bicycles including the D-Day landings.
5	Sweets	23 August 2016	3.22
Gregg and Cherry visit the Swizzels Matlow factory in Derbyshire to learn the secrets of how they make different sweets. Cherry learns how they put writing into rock and how different nations have different tastes in sweets. Ruth investigates how sweets were first invented.
6	Shoes	30 August 2016	2.80
Gregg and Cherry visit the New Balance factory in Cumbria to learn the secrets of how they make trainers. Cherry looks at how leather is processed as well as how ballet shoes are produced. Ruth traces the origins of trainers, specifically to Reebok which was founded by J.W. Foster and Sons in Bolton, Lancashire.
Special	Christmas 2016	20 December 2016	3.45
Gregg and Cherry visit the Mr Kipling factory in Barnsley to learn the secrets of how they make various Christmas treats like Mince pies and yule log. Cherry looks at how tinsel and wrapping paper are made, while Ruth looks at the history of Christmas crackers.

=== Series 3 (2017-2018) ===
Episode	Title	Original airdate	Viewers (millions)
1	Tea bags	18 July 2017	2.45
Gregg and Cherry visit the Typhoo factory on the Wirral, Merseyside to learn the secrets of how they make their teabags. Cherry looks at the process of how the tea leaves first start out before being shipped off to the factories.
2	Pasta	25 July 2017	2.52
Gregg and Cherry are at Barilla, the world's largest dried pasta factory in Parma, Italy, where they produce 150,000 kilometres of spaghetti each day.
3	Biscuits	1 August 2017	2.77
Gregg and Cherry visit the McVitie's factory to look at the production of chocolate digestive biscuits. Cherry looks at the preparation of the chocolate and the creation of the bronze moulds used to make biscuits.
Special	Christmas 2017	18 December 2017	2.91
Gregg is at a cake factory in Oldham where they make two million Christmas cakes for Marks and Spencer. Cherry visits Britain's largest marzipan factory. Ruth investigates why Christmas tree lights are called fairy lights.
4	Fish Fingers	2 January 2018	2.94
Gregg visits a Grimsby factory that makes 80,000 fish fingers daily. Cherry travels to Iceland where she follows fish through a processing factory. Ruth investigates the origins of cod fish fingers.
5	Sauces	9 January 2018	2.70
Gregg visits a factory in the Netherlands that produces a quarter of a million tonnes of condiments per year. Cherry finds out how glass jars are made. Ruth investigates Britain's love of mayonnaise and tells the history of Worcestershire sauce.
6	Soft Drinks	16 January 2018	3.10
Gregg is at the Ribena factory in Gloucestershire which produces three million bottles of the soft drink per week. Cherry discovers how berries are harvested and visits a plastic recycling plant that processes 2.5 million bottles per day. Ruth investigates the origins of fizzy drinks.

=== Series 4 (2018-2019) ===
Episode	Title	Original airdate	Viewers (millions)
1	Coffee	17 July 2018	2.48
Gregg visits the Nestlé Tutbury coffee factory in Derbyshire that produces 175,000 jars of instant coffee per day. Cherry is in the lab where she discovers the chemical composition of coffee. Ruth investigates the origins of instant coffee.
2	Toilet Roll	24 July 2018	2.56
Gregg is at a factory in Manchester that makes 700,000 toilet rolls a day. He follows the raw material from Sweden where it is harvested from a sustainable forest. Cherry finds out how they churn out 1,000 toilets a day at Britain's oldest toilet factory and sees how wastewater is treated at a plant in Brighton. Ruth discovers what items were used before the invention of toilet paper.
3	Sausages	31 July 2018	2.82
Gregg is in North Yorkshire at a factory that makes 625,000 sausages a day. Cherry finds out the best way to cook your sausage. Ruth discovers how a German bratwurst created the hot dog.
4	Curry	14 August 2018	3.19
Gregg visits the Nottinghamshire Worksop Factory that makes 250,000 jars of curry sauce daily. Cherry heads to India to follow the harvestation of chillies on a farm. Ruth discovers the origins of curry in Britain may be as far back as 1747.
Special	Christmas 2018	17 December 2018	2.83
Gregg visits a factory which makes 2,000,000 tins of festive chocolates per year. Cherry finds out how Christmas ornaments are made and discovers how festive postage stamps are printed at the Royal Mail. Ruth uncovers the tradition of the Christmas turkey.
5	Potato waffles	26 February 2019	2.85
Gregg is in Lowestoft at a frozen food factory where they produce one million potato waffles a day. Cherry learns about the different types of potatoes. Ruth finds out how the potato was popularised and meets one of the inventors of the potato waffle.
6	Pizza	5 March 2019	2.51
Gregg visits Italy where they make 400,000 frozen pizzas a day. Cherry discovers that not all cheeses are equal and which work best on pizza. Ruth finds out the history of freezer transport.
7	Beer	12 March 2019	2.48
Gregg follows the production at Britain's biggest brewery where they make 3,000,000 pints of beer a day. Cherry finds out how basic ingredients can make a wide variety of beers. Ruth discovers why Burton upon Trent became the heart of brewing in Britain in the 1800s.
8	Pencils	19 March 2019	2.54
Gregg is at the Faber-Castell factory in Stein, Bavaria, which makes 600,000 pencils a day. Cherry uncovers the properties of graphite – the main material that makes up a pencil. Ruth tells of the earliest pencils used in Britain.
9	Cheese	26 March 2019	2.62
Gregg visits the Primula cheese factory in Gateshead which makes 3,000 tonnes of spreadable cheese each year. Cherry discovers what determines the smell, taste and appearance of different types of cheese. Ruth finds out how cheddar became the most popular hard cheese worldwide.

=== Series 5 (2019-2020) ===
Episode	Title	Original airdate	Viewers (millions)
1	Cherry Bakewells	30 July 2019	3.04
Gregg is in Stoke at a factory that produces 250,000 cherry bakewells every day. Cherry finds out how to avoid a soggy bottom when baking tarts and pies at home. Ruth discovers the origins of frangipane – one of the cherry bakewell's key ingredients.
2	Wax Jacket	6 August 2019	3.03
Gregg visits South Shields at a factory where they make 650 waxed jackets per day. Cherry discovers how they make waterproof-breathable fabrics that keep the rain out while preventing sweat. Ruth finds out how seamen contributed to the origins of waxed jackets.
3	Croissants	13 August 2019	2.98
Gregg is at a factory in France where they make 336,000 croissants every day. Cherry discovers the best way to eat a croissant. Ruth travels outside of France to find the origin of the croissant.
4	Mattresses	20 August 2019	2.89
Gregg is in Beeston, Leeds at the Harrison Spinks factory that produces 600 mattresses per day. Cherry finds out if having an afternoon nap is better than drinking coffee. Ruth discovers the materials people slept on in the Middle Ages, how steel transformed the mattress and finds the origin of the duvet.
Special	Xmas Party Food	12 December 2019	2.54
Gregg Wallace is in Nottingham at an enormous party food factory where they produce 200,000 canapes every 24 hours.
6	Pasties	7 April 2020	TBA
Gregg Wallace is in Cornwall at an enormous bakery where they produce 180,000 pasties a day.
7	Pots and Pans	14 April 2020	TBA
Gregg Wallace is in France at an enormous foundry that produces a cast iron pot every five seconds.
8	Soup	21 April 2020	TBA
Gregg Wallace is at an enormous soup factory at H. J. Heinz, Wigan, where they produce more than two million tins a day.
9	Liqueurs	28 April 2020	TBA
Gregg Wallace is in Ireland at an enormous liqueurs factory, where they produce 540,000 bottles a day.
10	Cereal Bars	5 May 2020	3.04
Gregg Wallace is in Essex at an enormous cereal bar factory, which produces 400,000 fruit- and nut-packed treats a day. Gregg follows the production from the arrival of two tonnes of macadamia nuts all the way through to dispatch, while Cherry travels to Africa to find out how Macadamia nuts are harvested.

=== Keeping Britain Going (2020) ===
Keeping Britain Going was a mini-series of episodes between Series 5 and Series 6, which featured Gregg Wallace catching up with previously visited companies facing unprecedented demand amid the COVID-19 pandemic.

Episode	Title	Original airdate	Viewers (millions)
1	Toilet Roll Update	25 May 2020	TBA
As many UK factories face unprecedented demand amid the COVID-19 pandemic, Gregg Wallace catches up with some of the factory workers who are toiling around the clock to make sure our cupboards are stocked.
2	Baked Beans Update	1 June 2020	TBA
As many UK factories face unprecedented demand, Gregg Wallace catches up with the baked beans factory producing 15 million tins in a week.
3	Crisps Update	23 July 2020	TBA
As many UK factories face unprecedented demand, Gregg Wallace catches up with some of the factory workers who are toiling around the clock to make sure our cupboards are stocked.
4	Tea Update	30 July 2020	TBA
Gregg reconnects with the Typhoo Tea factory in the Wirral. The coronavirus crisis caused tea bag sales to soar, and the tea factory has upped production to produce 109 million tea bags in a week.
5	Biscuits Update	6 August 2020	TBA
Gregg Wallace reconnects with the McVitie's factory in Harlesden, London, who sold an astonishing 12.5 million packets in just two months during the coronavirus crisis.

=== Series 6 (2020-2022) ===
Episode	Title	Original airdate	Viewers (millions)
1	Cider	27 December 2020	TBA
Gregg visits the Bulmers factory in Herefordshire to learn the secrets of how they make their cider. Cherry visits an orchard growing a sweet apple variety called Scrumptious. Ruth goes in search of who first put bubbles in a bottle.
2	Socks	5 January 2021	TBA
Gregg visits the Pantherella sock factory in Leicester that produces one and a half million socks annually. Ruth delves into the history of socks in the late twentieth century. Cherry investigates whether certain sock materials cause smelly feet. Ruth looks at sock design during World War I. Cherry learns about a new environmentally friendly way of growing cotton.
3	Yoghurt	12 January 2021	TBA
Gregg visits the Yeo Valley factory in rural Somerset, that produces 125,000 tonnes of yogurt every year. Cherry tests plant-based milk alternatives. Ruth learns about the history of the first electric milk float. Cherry travels to Herefordshire to help with the UK's biggest blackcurrant harvest. Ruth investigates the origins of Cream tea.
Special	Christmas Cards	22 December 2021	TBA
Gregg visits the Woodmansterne card factory in Watford, one of the largest greeting card companies in the UK. Cherry visits a Teddy bear factory to see how they are made. Ruth looks into how the Victorians celebrated Christmas. Cherry cooks a plant-based vegan Christmas dinner. Ruth delves into the events of 1647 which led to Christmas being banned for 12 years.
4	Diggers (XL)	29 December 2021	TBA
Gregg visits the JCB factory in Rocester, Staffordshire that makes their iconic diggers. Ruth looks into the history of hydraulics. Cherry travels to Hertfordshire to sees how diggers help in the construction of a new road.
5	Malt Loaf	5 January 2022	TBA
Gregg Wallace visits the largest malt loaf factory in the world, encountering a production line of massive dough mixing, mind-boggling tin filling and intensely hot baking.
6	Chairs	12 January 2022	TBA
Gregg Wallace visits the Ercol factory in Buckinghamshire to follow the production of a Windsor chair. Meanwhile, Cherry Healey investigates how sitting too much could be very bad for our health.
7	Leather Boots	19 January 2022	TBA
Gregg Wallace visits a boot factory in Wollaston, Northamptonshire to follow the production of a pair of Dr. Martens, while Cherry Healey gets to grips with the machines that make shoelaces.
8	Tortilla Chips	26 January 2022	TBA
Gregg Wallace visits the biggest tortilla factory in Europe, while Cherry Healey takes on the hottest chilli in the world and Ruth Goodman reveals how the Elizabethans treated their ruff collars.
9	Mugs	2 February 2022	TBA
Gregg visits the Denby factory in Derbyshire. Brits drink 195 million mugs of tea and coffee every day, so Gregg is following production of one of the factory's best sellers, the Halo Heritage mug.
10	Ice Cream	9 February 2022	TBA
Gregg visits a family-run factory in the heart of rural Aberdeenshire, which churns out more than 49 tonnes of dairy ice cream every day. Cherry tests the best methods of stopping brain freeze and goes in search of a non-drip ice lolly. Ruth hops on board an ice cream van to find out how soft whip became a favourite on Britain's streets.
11	Vacuums	16 February 2022	TBA
Gregg visits a huge vacuum cleaner factory in the heart of Somerset and follows their biggest seller, the Henry vacuum cleaner in bright red.

=== Series 7 (2022-2023) ===
Episode	Title	Original airdate	Viewers (millions)
1	Trains (XL)	1 August 2022	TBC
The programme features Alstom's Derby Litchurch Lane Works and shows how a Class 720 Aventra 5-car electric multiple unit for Greater Anglia is built.
2	Buses (XL)	8 August 2022	TBC
Gregg visits the Alexander Dennis / Plaxton factory in Scarborough to see how the iconic red double-decker London Bus is made, in the form of the fully-electric Enviro400EV.
3	Jaffa Cakes	4 April 2023	TBC
Gregg Wallace visits a factory that churns out 1.4 billion Jaffa Cakes a year, while Cherry Healey is in the city responsible for growing the fruit that gives these cakes their name.
4	Pork Pies	11 April 2023	TBC
Gregg Wallace explores the Vale of Mowbray pork pie factory, which began making pork pies in 1928. Cherry Healey reveals hacks for the perfect vegan shortcrust pastry.
5	Crumpets	18 April 2023	TBC
Gregg Wallace visits a factory making 432 million crumpets every year. Cherry Healey learns the science of making batter for pancakes, and Ruth Goodman reveals how crumpets got their bubbles.
6	Vegan Sausages	25 April 2023	TBC
Gregg visits a factory that churns out up to 90,000 vegan sausages a day, while Ruth Goodman uncovers the green shoots of the vegetarian movement in Britain.
7	Rice Pudding	2 May 2023	TBC
Gregg Wallace explores the Ambrosia factory in Lifton, Devon, to reveal how it makes up to 360,000 rice puddings every single day.
8	Mints	9 May 2023	TBC
Gregg visits a factory that churns out 32 million mints per day. Cherry Healey visits the largest sugar beet factory in Europe, and Ruth Goodman explores minty mouthwash marketing.

=== Series 8 (2023-2024) ===
Episode	Title	Original airdate	Viewers (millions)
1	Yorkshire Puddings	27 December 2023	TBC
Gregg Wallace steps inside a huge Yorkshire puddings factory in Hull to learn how Aunt Bessie's produces a staggering 500 million Yorkshire puddings every year.
2	Jelly Beans	3 January 2024	TBC
Gregg Wallace visits a jelly beans factory in Dublin to reveal the astonishing processes used to make ten million of these colourful little sweets every day.
3	Jeans	9 January 2024	TBC
Gregg Wallace visits two factories in Italy and Wales to learn how denim cloth is made and then transformed into one of the world's most popular items of clothing - jeans.
4	Stuffed Pasta	16 January 2024	TBC
Gregg Wallace visits a food factory in Hertfordshire that produces 500 million parcels of stuffed pasta every year.
5	Stout	23 January 2024	TBC
Gregg Wallace visits a huge brewery in Dublin to learn how two million litres of an iconic Irish stout are produced every day.
6	Bath Bombs	28 January 2024	TBC
Gregg Wallace visits the colourful and fragrant Lush factory in Dorset to learn how an astonishing 14 million bath bombs are produced every year.
7	Carpets	4 February 2024	TBC
Gregg Wallace visits a huge carpet factory in Devon to learn how it weaves 46,000 square metres of carpet every year.
8	Chocolate Bars	11 February 2024	TBC
Gregg Wallace visits an enormous factory in York to learn how millions of peppermint-flavoured bubbly chocolate bars are produced every year.
9	Sofas	18 February 2024	TBC
Gregg Wallace is in West Yorkshire, visiting a huge factory that makes more than 5,000 sofas every year. Meanwhile, Cherry Healey learns about the science of light bulbs.
10	Paint and Wallpaper	25 February 2024	TBC
Gregg Wallace visits a colourful factory that produces 200,000 litres of paint and 10,000 metres of wallpaper every week.

=== Series 9 (2025) ===
Episode	Title	Original airdate	Viewers (millions)
1	Christmas Chocolate Seashells	22 December 2024	TBC
In this Christmas special, new presenter Paddy McGuinness and Cherry Healey visit the Guylian chocolate factory in Belgium that produces four million chocolate seashells every day.
2	Sliced Bread	7 January 2025	TBC
New presenter Paddy McGuinness makes a nostalgic visit to the Warburtons bread factory in his hometown of Bolton, where he had a Saturday job more than 30 years ago.
3	Cheese Curls	14 January 2025	TBC
Paddy McGuinness visits the Walker’s factory in Lincoln to explore the surprising process of turning potato starch into 500 million packs of Quavers cheese curls every year.
4	Flapjacks	21 January 2025	TBC
Paddy McGuinness enjoys a lot of taste tests when he visits a factory in London to learn how they produce sticky toffee flapjacks on an epic scale.
5	Hardback Books	28 January 2025	TBC
Paddy McGuinness and Cherry Healey visit a factory that produces three million books every week and makes 20,000 hardback copies of Pride and Prejudice.
6	Sausage Rolls	4 February 2025	TBC
Paddy McGuinness visits a factory in Northern Ireland producing sausage rolls on an epic scale.

It was confirmed by Paddy McGuinness that there would be a 10th series with filming beginning in May 2025.

=== Series 10 (2025-2026) ===
Episode	Title	Original airdate	Viewers (millions)
1	Gingerbread	23 December 2025	TBC
Paddy McGuinness and Cherry Healey are in the festive spirit as they join factory workers in Market Drayton producing gingerbread Santa and reindeer biscuits for Christmas.
2	Jammy Biscuits	6 January 2026	TBC
Paddy McGuinness explores the secrets of the Jammie Dodgers factory in south Wales, and Cherry heads to Leeds to learn how marshmallows are made.
3	Oven Chips	13 January 2026	TBC
Paddy McGuinness explores the secrets of the McCain factory near Scarborough to reveal how it cuts, fries and freezes 80 million chips a day, and Cherry explores malt vinegar science and potato harvesting.
4	Throat Lozenges	20 January 2026	TBC
Paddy McGuinness goes behind the scenes at a Nottingham-based factory that manufactures 230 million throat lozenges and tablets each week.
5	Breakfast Cereal	27 January 2026	TBC
Paddy McGuinness explores the Kellogg’s factory in Wrexham to reveal how it makes 120 million boxes of breakfast cereal a year.
6	Lawnmowers	3 February 2026	TBC
Paddy McGuinness and Cherry Healey enjoy a summertime visit to the Hayter factory in Hertfordshire that produces 15,000 lawnmowers every year.

== Re-edited and syndicated versions ==
=== Netherlands ===
In the Netherlands, some episodes have been re-edited together, cutting out the presenters, to produce a series called Zo wordt het gemaakt which has been broadcast by RTL.

=== United States ===
In the US, the Smithsonian Channel shows a re-edited version of the show, still presented by Gregg Wallace, called Inside the Food Factory, which has also been broadcast on Smithsonian's British Freeview channel. These episodes are available on the Smithsonian Channel website.
