= Ideal Bread Company Factory =

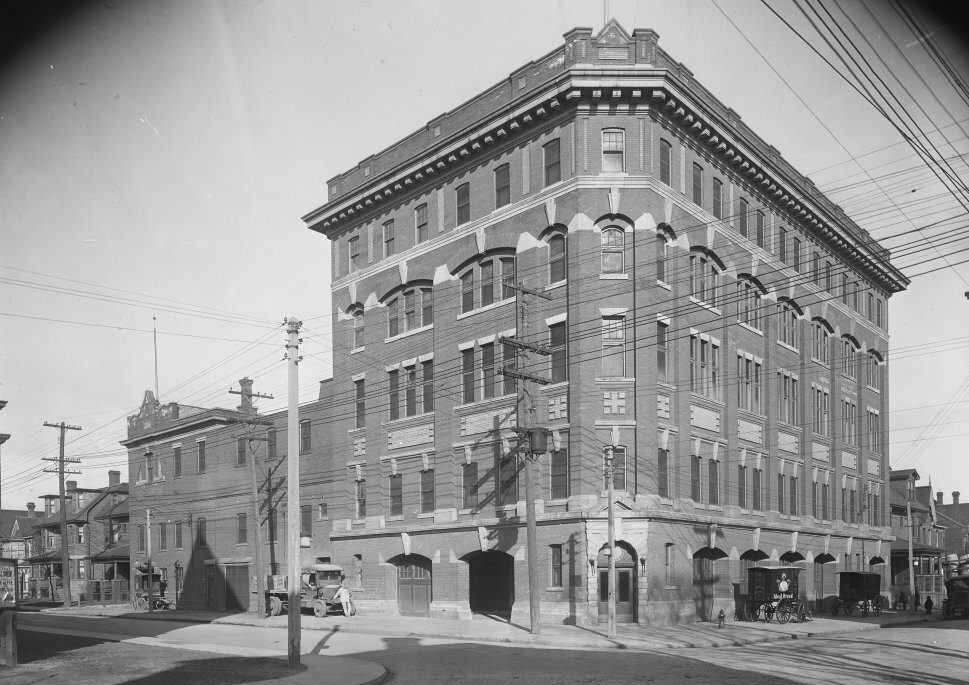
- Building shown in 1923.
- Interactive map of the Ideal Bread Company Factory area

General information
- Architectural style: Edwardian Classical
- Location: 183 Dovercourt Road, Toronto
- Coordinates: 43.646409°N 79.423256°W
- Year built: 1919
- Renovated: 1923, 1933 (additions to the factory), 2007 (conversion to lofts)
- Closed: 1957 (bread factory)
- Owner: Ideal Bread Company, later Wonder Bakeries

Technical details
- Material: steel and concrete, clad with red brick and trimmed with red and brown brick, artificial stone and metal

Design and construction
- Architect: Sydney Comber

Ontario Heritage Act
- Official name: Ideal Bread Company Factory
- Designated: 2003

The Ideal Bread Company Factory is a preserved industrial bakery building, located at 183 Dovercourt Road, in Little Portugal, Toronto. The former factory building was converted to residential lofts in 2007, designated under Part IV of the Ontario Heritage Act since 2003.

== Heritage details ==
The building was opened as a commercial bakery by the Ideal Bread Company in 1919, which merged into Wonder Bakeries. The building was owned by the company until 1957. After designation under Part IV of the Ontario Heritage Act in 2003, the building was turned into residential lofts in 2007 (now known as the Argyle Lofts) by Core Architects.

The designation plaque affixed to the building notes the following: "Montreal architect Sydney Comber designed this factory building in Edwardian Classical style. Its façades feature stone detailing and are divided into distinct bays by brick pilasters. Window design is unique to each level and reflects the original separation - by factory floors - of the processes of bread production. In the final stage, bread wagons were loaded from the ground-level archways on Argyle Street. In use as a bakery until 1957, this building was converted to residential lofts in 2007. The factory clock remains above the front entrance."

Most of the industrial equipment inside the factory remained in place before the building was repurposed. There were fears the building would be demolished before it was decided to convert it to residential spaces; before the final decision was made to keep the building open, a temporary photo exhibit was used to illustrate the history of the site, featuring a local Toronto photographer.
