= Fernhurst Research Station =

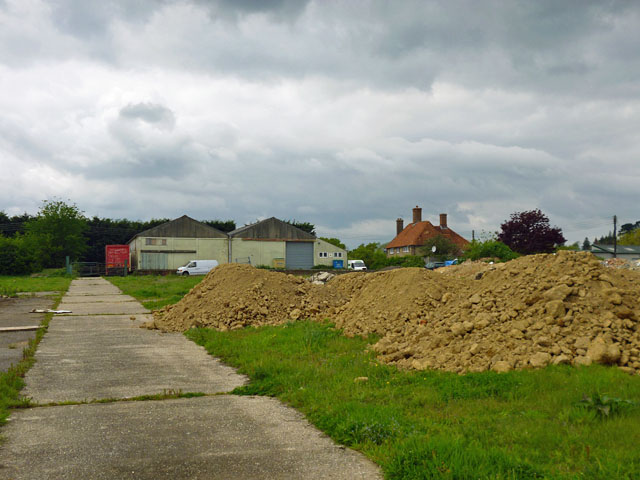
- Part of the former research station at Hurstfold Farm

- Location within West Sussex
- Former names: Fernhurst Research Centre
- Alternative names: ICI Fernhurst, Plant Protection Fernhurst

General information
- Type: Chemical Research Centre
- Location: Fernhurst, West Sussex, GU27 3ER
- Coordinates: 51.03°N 0.72°W
- Elevation: 80 m (262 ft)
- Current tenants: Vacated
- Completed: 1945
- Client: ICI
- Owner: ICI Plant Protection
- Landlord: ICI Plant Protection

The Fernhurst Research Station was a crop protection chemical research institute in West Sussex, mainly run by ICI, for the fruit industry. The site is to the east of the A286, around a mile south of the village of Fernhurst and a mile north of the Haslemere to Petersfield Serpent Trail.

== History ==
Plant Protection Limited moved to the site in 1945 and opened a research institute on the estate of Sir Felix Schuster (1854–1936). The research institute was to investigate pest and disease control in horticultural crops. As well as being an administrative site, the station comprised a 60 acres (24 ha) orchard including 9 acres of plums and 26 acres of dessert apples at Hurstfold Farm.

In June 1951 an international conference, with scientists from 39 countries, took place at the site on food scarcity. On 10 May 1955, the site was visited by the Duke of Edinburgh. Another international conference took place at the site in June 1956.

In 1958 Plant Protection Limited became a wholly owned subsidiary of Imperial Chemical Industries: ICI Plant Protection Division, which had its international headquarters at the site until the 1990s; in 1986 a new international conference centre was opened on the site by Prime Minister Margaret Thatcher. ICI Public Health was formed in 1989 and based at the site.

Throughout its history, indoor and outdoor crops were grown for wholesale and for research, and the station developed advanced growing and application methods for crops, including the establishment of a film unit. In April 1990, the site won a Queen's Award for Technological Achievement for herbicides, fungicides and pesticides.

The site was taken over by Zeneca in 1994, and later Syngenta, becoming the headquarters of Syngenta Europe Ltd. Syngenta left the site in December 2001, and the site ceased to function as a research station or administrative centre apart from the principal building, which is the head office of Aspinal of London. The other office buildings were left unoccupied and were subsequently comprehensively vandalised. At its peak, around 700 people had worked at the site.

== Redevelopment ==
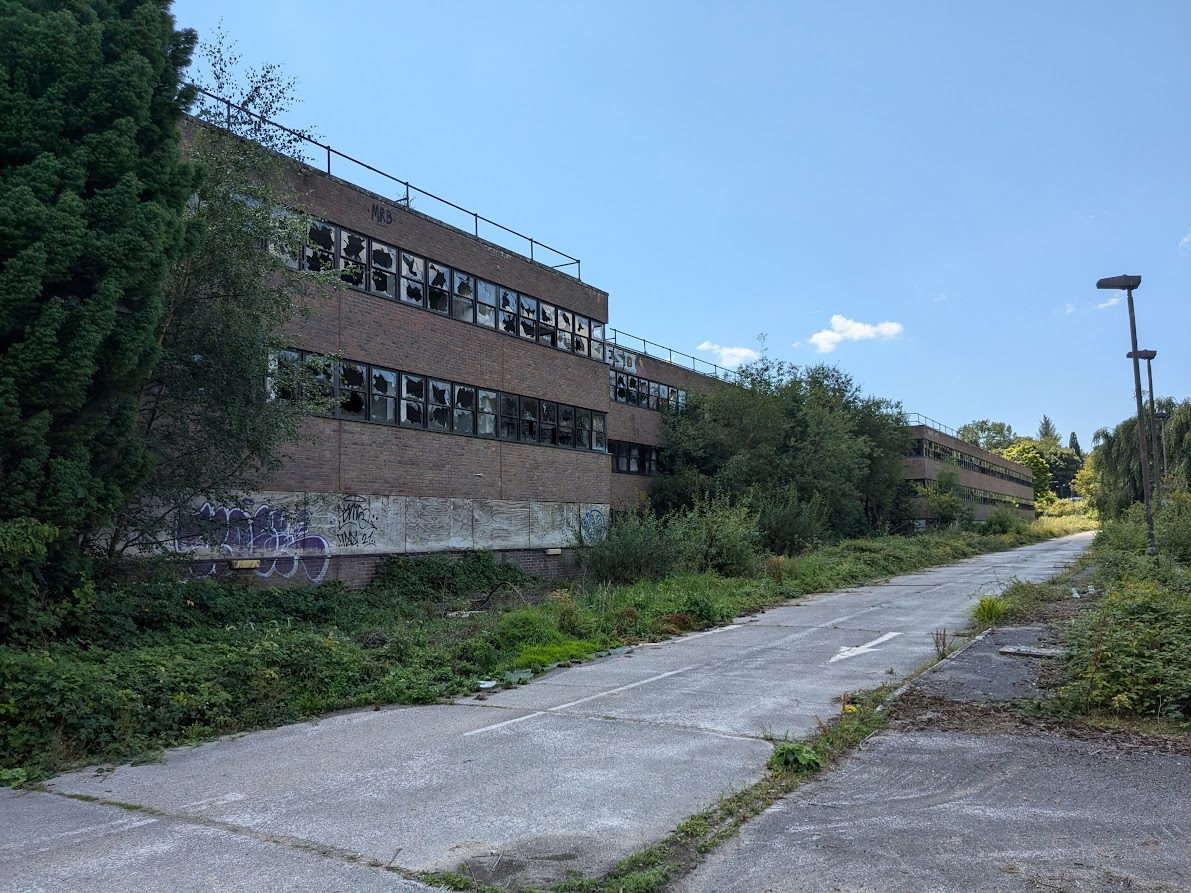
North face of the Highfield office block with boarded up and smashed windows, 20 years after its closure.

The redevelopment of the Highfield part of the site for housing was approved by the South Downs National Park Authority in 2020 and expanded upon in 2023.

== See also ==
- Fruit and Vegetable Preservation Research Station
- Fruit picking
- List of environmental research institutes
- Scottish Crop Research Institute
