= KitKat =

Chocolate-covered wafer bar

- Product type: Confectionery
- Current owner: Nestlé; Hershey's (US licence)
- Country: United Kingdom
- Introduced: September 1935; 91 years ago
- Related brands: Rolo
- Markets: Worldwide
- Previous owners: Rowntree (1935–1988)
- Tagline: "Have a break...Have a Kit Kat!" (Worldwide) "Gimme a break, Gimme a break, Break me off a piece of that Kit Kat Bar!", "Break time, anytime" (US only)
- Website: kitkat.com

KitKat is a British chocolate bar created by Rowntree's of York, England. It is produced globally by Nestlé (which acquired Rowntree's in 1988), except in the United States, where it is made under licence by the Hershey Company (an agreement Rowntree's first made with Hershey in 1970).

Standard Kit Kat bars have two or four pieces, known as "fingers". Each finger has three layers of wafer covered in a thin coating of chocolate. Each finger can be snapped from the bar separately. There are many flavours of Kit Kat, including milk, white and dark chocolate.

The original four-finger version of the bar was developed after a worker at Rowntree's York factory put a suggestion in the recommendation box for "a chocolate bar that a man could take to work in his pack up". It was launched in September 1935 in the UK as Rowntree's Chocolate Crisp and the later two-finger version was launched in 1936. It was renamed Kit Kat Chocolate Crisp in 1937 and just Kit Kat after World War II.

Since making its first television appearance in a British advert in 1958, the slogan for the Kit Kat in the UK and elsewhere has been "Have a break... have a Kit Kat". Since 1986 in the US, the jingle used in television advertisements includes the phrase "Gimme a break, Gimme a break, Break me off a piece of that Kit Kat bar!"

== History ==
Use of the name Kit Kat or Kit Cat for a type of food goes back to the 18th century, when mutton pies known as Kit Kats were served at meetings of the political Kit-Cat Club in London owned by pastry chef Christopher Cat.

The origins of what is now known as the Kit Kat brand go back to 1911, when Rowntree's trademarked the terms Kit Cat and Kit Kat. The names were not used immediately and Kit Kat first appeared in the 1920s, when Rowntree's launched a brand of boxed chocolates entitled Kit Cat. This continued into the 1930s, when Rowntree's shifted focus and production onto its Black Magic and Dairy Box brands. With the promotion of alternative products, the Kit Cat brand decreased and was eventually discontinued. The original four-finger bar was developed after a worker at Rowntree's York Factory put a suggestion in a recommendation box for a snack that "a man could take to work in his pack". The bar was officially launched in September 1935, under the title of Rowntree's Chocolate Crisp (priced at 2d) and was sold in London and throughout southern England.

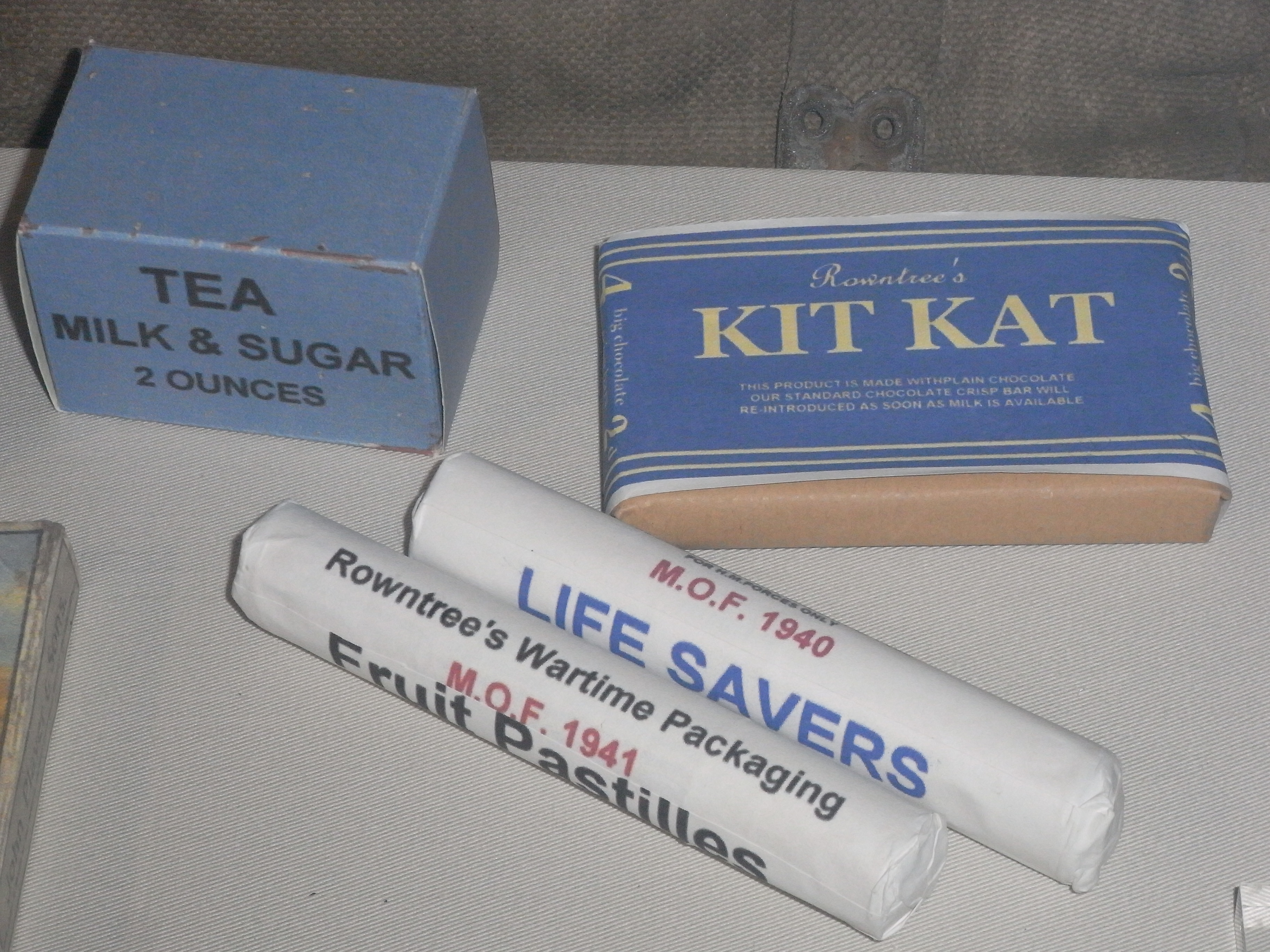
Exhibit of British foods in the 1940s during World War II. Pictured in blue wartime packaging (M.O.F. is an abbreviation for Ministry of Food), Rowntree's Kit Kat returned to red packaging after the war.

Rowntree's Chocolate Crisp was renamed as Kit Kat Chocolate Crisp in 1937. The colour scheme and first flavour variation to the brand came in 1942, owing to World War II, when food shortages prompted an alteration in the recipe. The flavour of Kit Kat was changed to dark chocolate; the packaging abandoned its Chocolate Crisp title and was coloured blue. After the war the name became Kit Kat, with the original milk chocolate recipe and red packaging.

Following its success in the United Kingdom, in the 1940s, Kit Kat was exported to Canada, South Africa, Ireland, Australia and New Zealand. In 1957, Donald Gilles, the executive at JWT London, created the iconic advertising line "Have a Break, Have a Kit Kat". The brand further expanded in the 1970s when Rowntree created a new distribution factory in Germany to meet European demand and established agreements to distribute the brand in the US through the Hershey Company and in Japan through Fujiya.

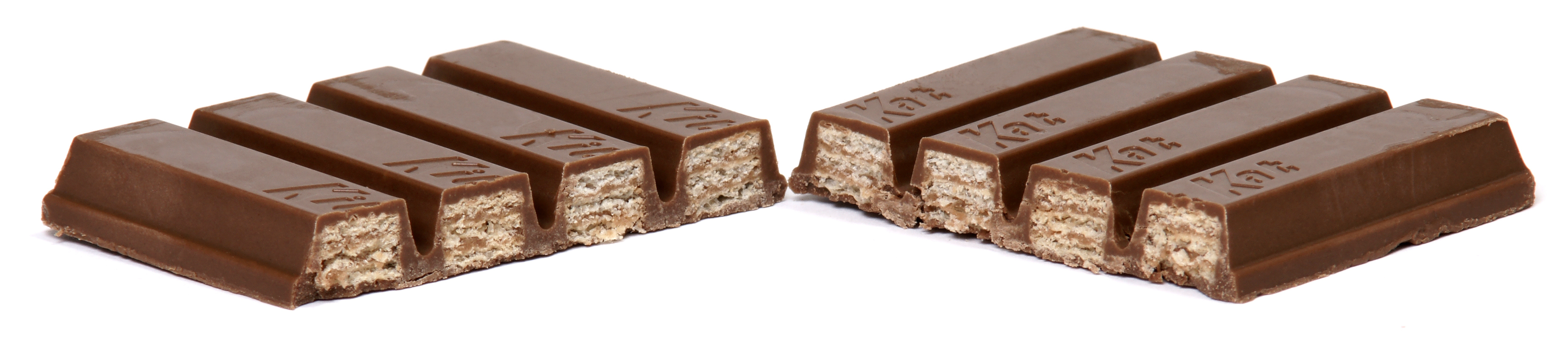
A 4-fingered Kit Kat split in half.

In June 1988, Swiss company Nestlé acquired Kit Kat through the purchase of Rowntree's, giving Nestlé global control over the brand, except in the US and production and distribution increased with new facilities in Japan and additional manufacturing operations set up in Malaysia, India and China.

The Hershey Company has a licence to produce Kit Kat bars in the United States which dates from 1970, when Hershey executed a licensing agreement with Rowntree's. The perpetual agreement includes a "change of control" opt-out clause, allowing Hershey to retain the Kit Kat licence so long as Hershey is not sold. Nestlé, which has a substantial presence in the US, had to honour the licensing agreement when it bought Rowntree in 1988. As Kit Kat is one of Hershey's top five brands in the US market, the Kit Kat licence was a key factor in Hershey's failed attempt to attract a serious buyer in 2002. Even Nestlé rejected Hershey's asking price. Nestlé's sale of its US confectionery business to Ferrara Candy Company in 2018 did not impact the Kit Kat bar and thus rights would revert directly to Nestlé and not Ferrara in the event of a sale of Hershey.

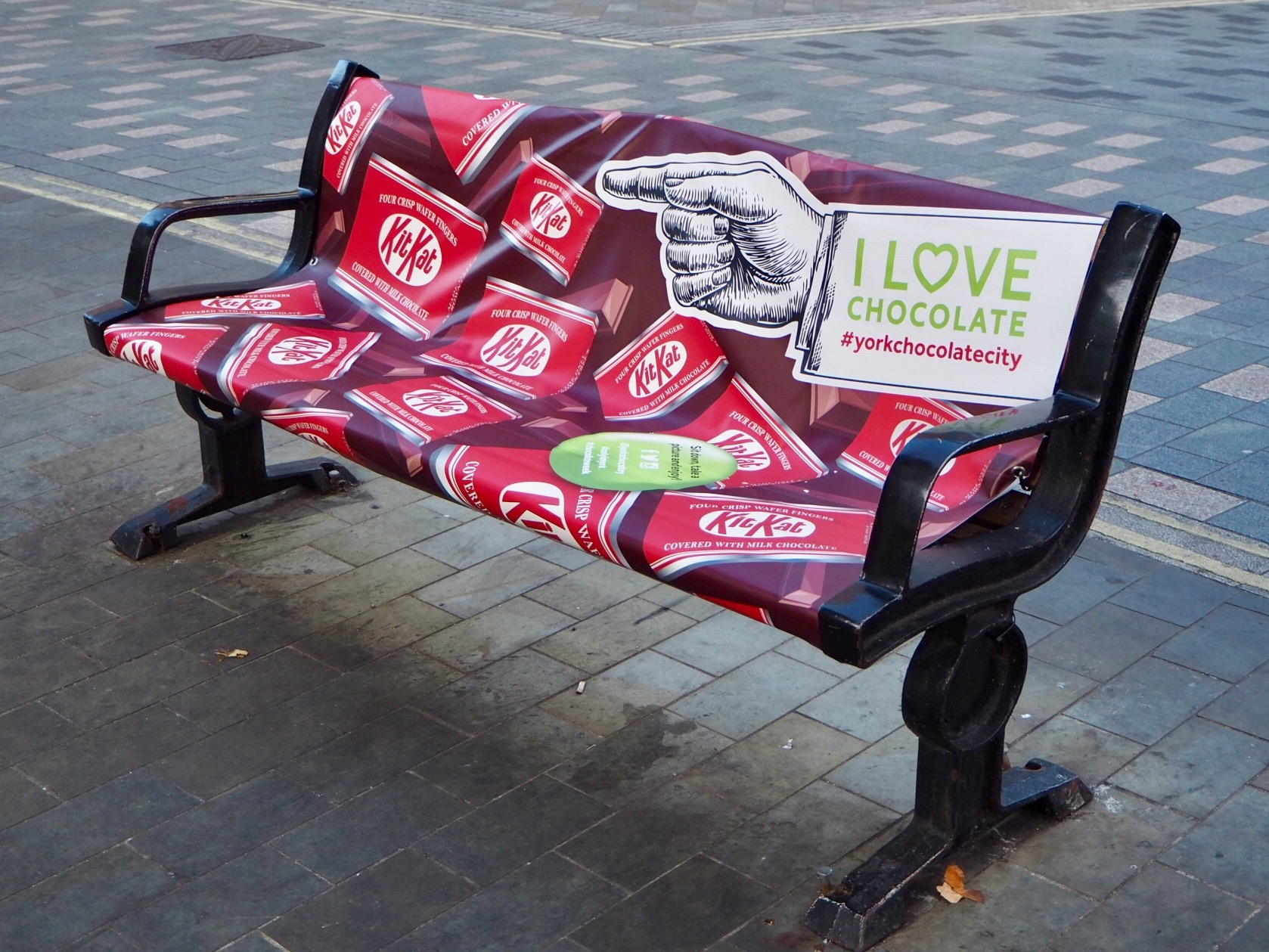
Bench with Kit Kat advertising in York (where the bar was created) to mark National Chocolate Week in the UK in 2018

Variants in the traditional chocolate bar first appeared in 1996 when Kit Kat Orange, the first flavour variant, was introduced in the UK. Its success was followed by several varieties including mint and caramel and in 1999 Kit Kat Chunky was launched and received favourably by international consumers. Variations on the traditional Kit Kat have continued to be developed since then. In 2000, Nestlé acquired Fujiya's share of the brand in Japan and also expanded its marketplace in Japan, Russia, Turkey and Venezuela, in addition to markets in Eastern and Central Europe. Throughout the decade, Kit Kat introduced dozens of flavours and line extensions within specific consumer markets. In September 2010, Kit Kat (and Aero) celebrated its 75th anniversary. Nestlé stated, "Since that momentous day in 1935, Kit Kat has firmly established itself in British culture, spreading its chocolate fingers far and wide that is sold in more countries than any other chocolate brand".

The traditional bar has four fingers which each measure approximately 1 centimetre (0.4 in) by 9 centimetres (3.5 in). A two-finger bar was launched in the 1930s and has remained the company's best-selling biscuit brand ever since. The 1999 Kit Kat Chunky (known as Big Kat and Kit Kat Extra Crispy in the US) has one large finger approximately 2.5 centimetres (1 in) wide. Kit Kat bars contain varying numbers of fingers depending on the market, ranging from the half-finger sized Kit Kat Petit in Japan, to the three-fingered variants in Arabia and the twelve-finger family-size bars in Australia and France. Kit Kat bars are sold individually and in bags, boxes and multi-packs.

== Global Confection ==
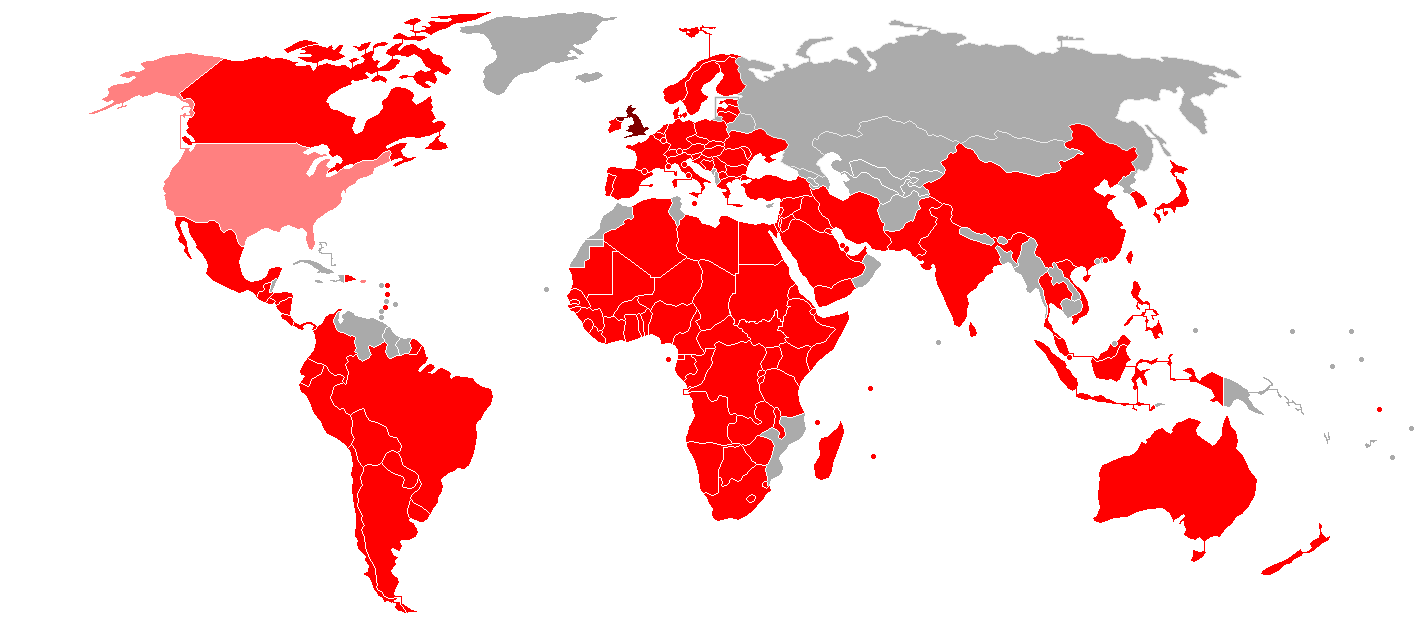
Map of countries where Kit Kat is marketed. Dark Red: UK (country of origin). Red: Countries with KitKat products owned by Nestlé. Light Red: Countries with KitKat products manufactured by Hershey (US).

Kit Kat bars are produced in 16 countries by Nestlé: Brazil, Mexico, United Kingdom, Canada, Australia, New Zealand, South Africa, Germany, Russia, Japan, China, Malaysia, Thailand, India, Turkey, United Arab Emirates, Bulgaria and Algeria. Kit Kat bars in the United States are produced under licence by the Hershey Company, a Nestlé competitor, due to a prior licensing agreement with Rowntree.

The year 2003 was a turning point for the Kit Kat bar as well as the confectionery industry in general. The popularity of low carb diets and the push to healthier eating stifled sales growth in many parts of the world. In addition, fierce competition from Cadbury's newly formed Dairy Milk superbrand also contributed to Kit Kat sales decreasing considerably in its home market of the UK and threatened to depose it from its No.1 position. The solution adopted by Nestlé and others was to increase dramatically the number of new and unique variations of their confections and market them as limited or special editions, usually only available for a few months at a time so as not lose sales of their standard products. The strategy initially reversed the decline of the Kit Kat and has been adopted worldwide by Nestlé, Hershey, Mars and others with similar success. This has resulted in many new flavours and varieties of the Kit Kat and other confections appearing globally since then.

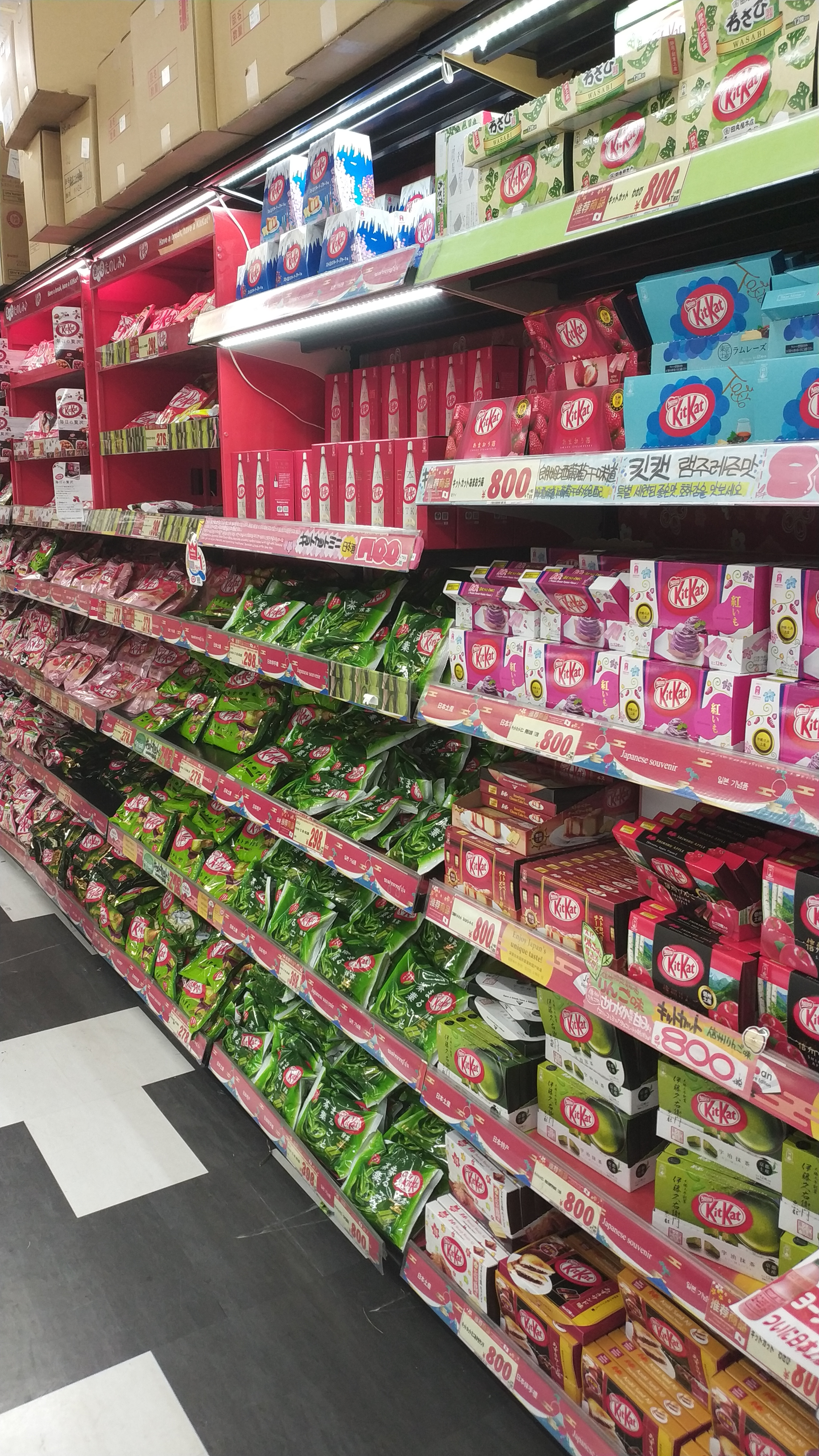
Kit Kat varieties on display in Japan, where the bar is seen as an "obsession"

In September 2006, Nestlé announced that they would be cutting 645 jobs in their York factory and moving all Smarties production to their Hamburg factory, which had already made up for two-thirds of production. They stated that this move would allow for a £20 million investment to modernise the antiquated York factory and improve Kit Kat production. In 2010, a new £5 million manufacturing line was opened by Nestlé in York, to produce more than one billion Kit Kat bars each year.

As dark chocolate has seen increased demand and favour worldwide because of its purported health benefits, in September 2006 the four-finger Kit Kat Fine Dark was launched in the United Kingdom as a permanent product. Hershey had sold the four-finger Kit Kat Dark in the US several years previously as a limited edition and began doing so again.

Nestlé now manufactures two-finger Kit Kats with natural flavourings and in February 2021 announced the rollout of the first vegan Kit Kat, called "KitKat V". In 2014, Kit Kat was ranked the third best selling chocolate bar in the United Kingdom, after Dairy Milk and Galaxy. Sometimes considered a biscuit, in 2020 sales of Kit Kats were second to McVitie's biscuits in the UK in the biscuit category.

== Design ==
When first introduced in the United Kingdom in 1935, the original Rowntree's Chocolate Crisp bar had a red wrapper, which briefly became blue between 1945 and 1947. The Kit Kat logo was added in 1937. As a result of milk shortages after the end of World War II – a period of rationing in the UK – dark chocolate was used instead of milk chocolate during that period. Since its introduction into the US in the 1970s, the Hershey's Kit Kat packaging and advertising has differed from the branding used in every other country where it was sold. In 2002, Hershey Kit Kats adopted the slanted ellipse logo used worldwide by Nestlé, though the ellipse was red and the text white. The US version of "Kit Kat Chunky" is known as "Big Kat".

In the United Kingdom, the product was traditionally wrapped in silver foil and an outer paper band. In 2001 this was changed to flow wrap plastic. Foil and paper wrapping is still used for Kit Kats sold as part of a multipack. In 2020, Kit Kat won the Lausanne Index Prize - Best of Packaging.

== Marketing and promotion ==
=== Advertising ===
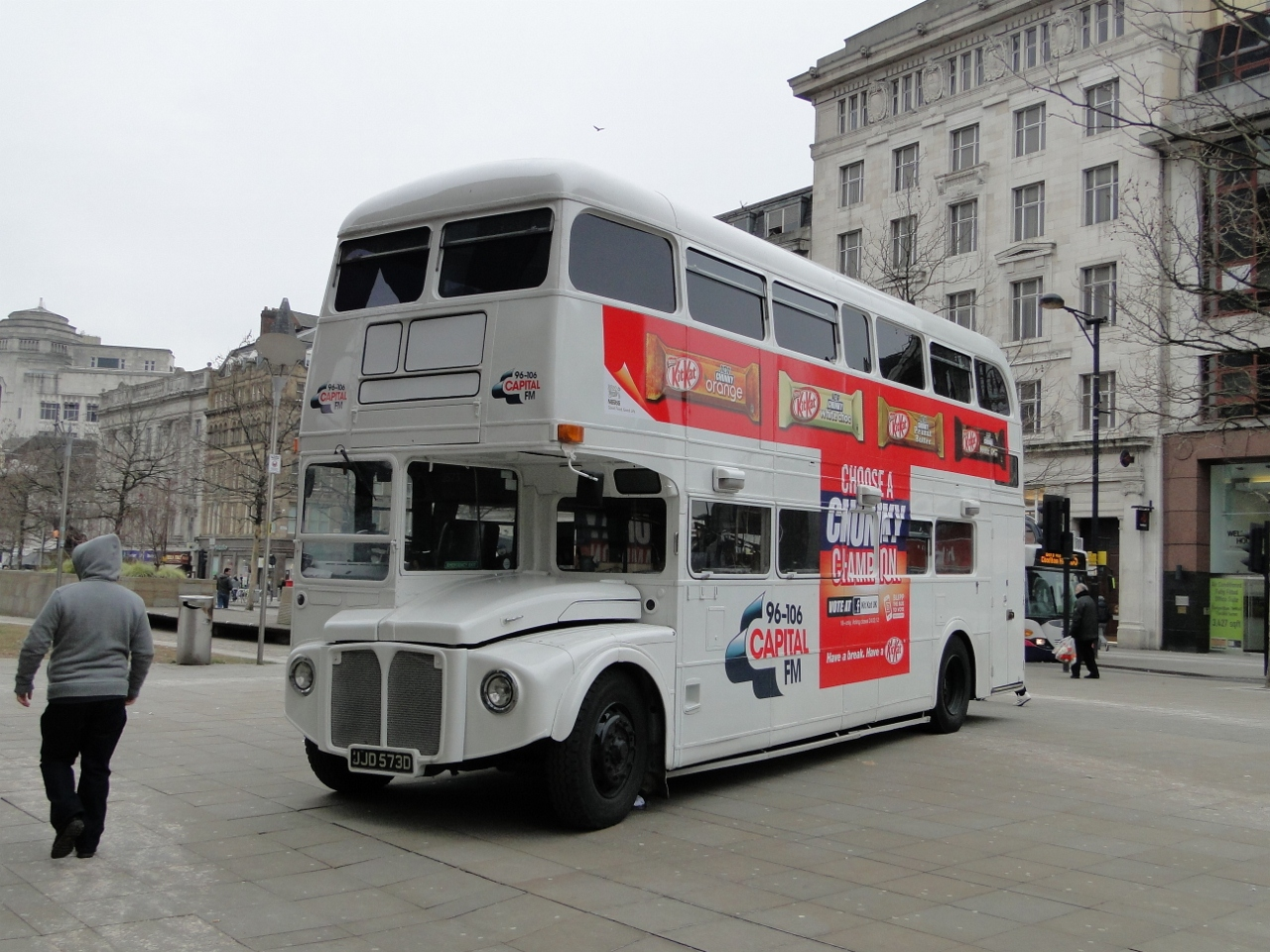
AEC Routemaster bus converted into a mobile radio station by Capital London with four varieties of Kit Kat advertised in Manchester, England

After launching in the 1930s, Rowntree's Chocolate Crisp was originally advertised with the slogans "the biggest little meal" and "the perfect companion to a cup of tea". During World War II, Kit Kat was depicted as a valuable wartime foodstuff, with the slogan "what active people need". The first Kit Kat poster appeared in 1951 and the brand made its first television appearance in a UK advert in 1958. The first colour TV advertisement appeared in 1969.

Since 1957, the slogan for the Kit Kat in the UK and elsewhere has been "Have a break... have a Kit Kat". However, in 1995, Nestlé sought to trademark the "Have a break" portion. After a ten-year legal battle, which was contested by rival Mars, the European Court of Justice ruled on 7 July 2005 to send the case back to the British courts. In 2004, Nestlé UK used the slogan "Make the most of your break" but later returned to the original slogan.

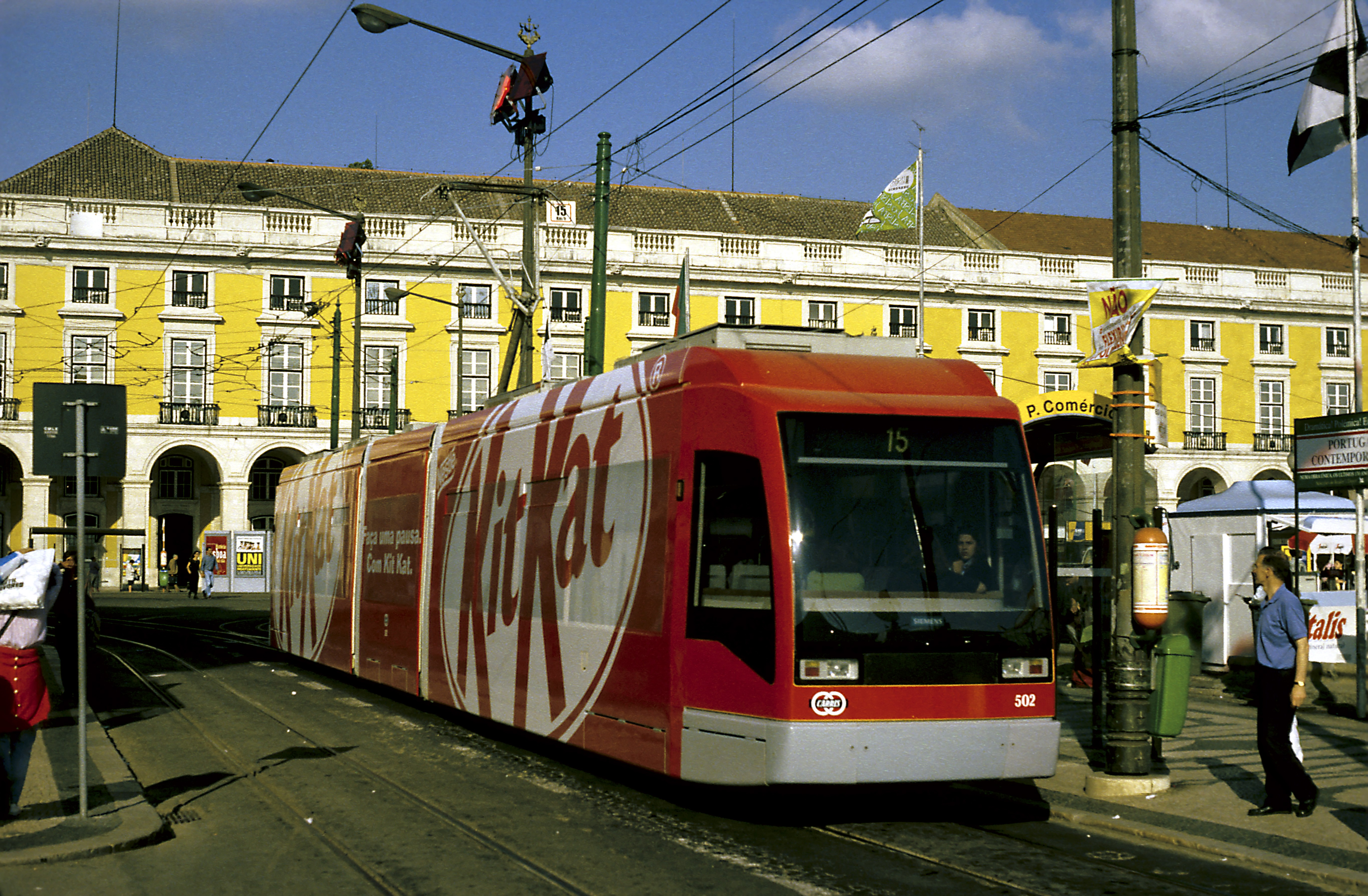
Kit Kat logo on a tram in Lisbon, Portugal

The United States also used the short-lived slogan, "Tastes So Good, You'll Roar", in the early 1980s. The TV advert most known from this slogan involves a young man biting into one of the Kit Kat bars in a grocery shop and roaring like a lion so loudly the shop shakes violently, knocking items from the shelves. Another short-lived US slogan was "That's What You Want", whose television adverts showed people pulling unlikely foodstuffs from their pockets or purses, before rejecting them in favour of a Kit Kat. The classic American version of the ‘Gimme a Break’ Kit Kat jingle (in use in the US since 1986) was written by Ken Shuldman (copy) and Michael A. Levine (music) for the DDB Advertising Agency. Versions of the original have been covered by Carrie Underwood, Shawn Colvin and many studio singers, as well as people who have appeared on-camera in the adverts. The jingle was cited in a study by University of Cincinnati researcher James J. Kellaris as one of the top ten "earworms" – bits of melody that become stuck in your head. Another version of the advertising jingle 'Gimme a break' created for a Kit Kat Factory advert in the US was an original recording by Andrew W.K. W.K. was hired to write a new musical version for their ‘Gimme a break’ slogan. Variations on the Andrew W.K. advertisement included executive dance routines in corporate offices and a network newsroom. However, the classic song has also been used again since the newer version first aired in 2004.

Many adverts were worldwide hits among them in the 1980s with Ken Campbell in an advert with Heaven and Hell with Devil and Angel on television. In Australia, TV ads for Kit Kat featured the classic children's show Thunderbirds, which played off the catchphrase "Thunderbirds Are Go" but instead sees one of the members enjoying a Kit Kat break. A 1989 UK television advertisement for Kit Kat, in which a zoo photographer takes a break from waiting for pandas to appear in an enclosure and misses them performing a dance routine, came in 30th in Channel 4's The 100 Greatest TV Ads poll in 2000.

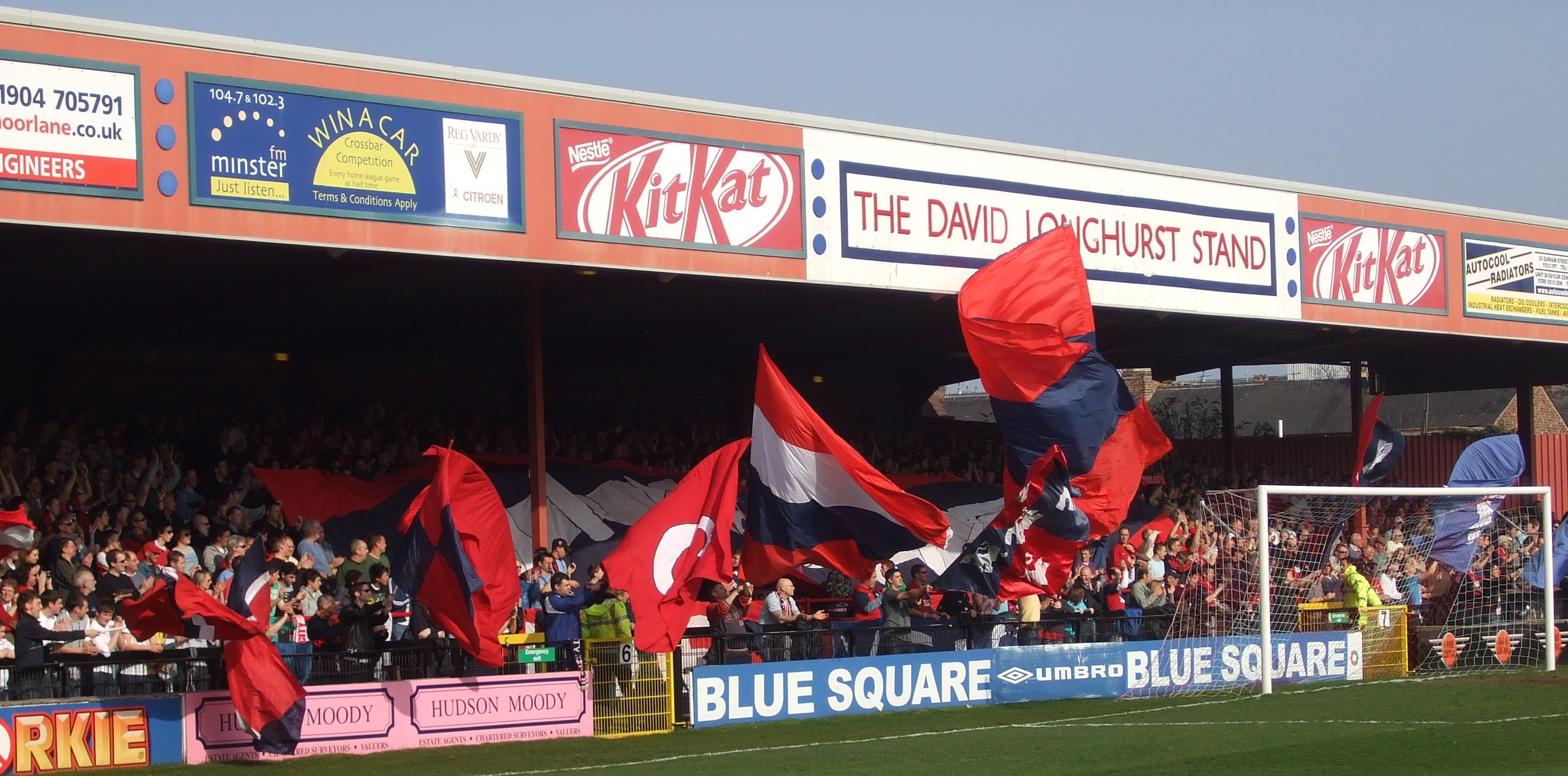
Bootham Crescent was known as KitKat Crescent from 2004 to 2006.

In late 2004 through to the end of 2006, Nestlé Rowntree sponsored the English football club York City F.C. As a result, the club's home-ground, Bootham Crescent, was renamed to KitKat Crescent. The Maltese tour boat MV Lady Davinia had a distinctive red and white Kit Kat paint scheme before she sank in 2008.

In a 2012 advertising campaign in the UK and Ireland, several new flavours of Chunky Kit Kat were marketed, with consumers being asked to vote for their favourite. Selecting from white chocolate, double chocolate, peanut butter and orange, Peanut butter was the winner with 47% of votes. A similar campaign occurred in 2013 with mint, coconut, hazelnut and chocolate fudge. Kit Kat became the official chocolate bars of Formula One, with the largest global sponsorship beginning at F1's 75th anniversary season in 2025.

=== Association with Android ===
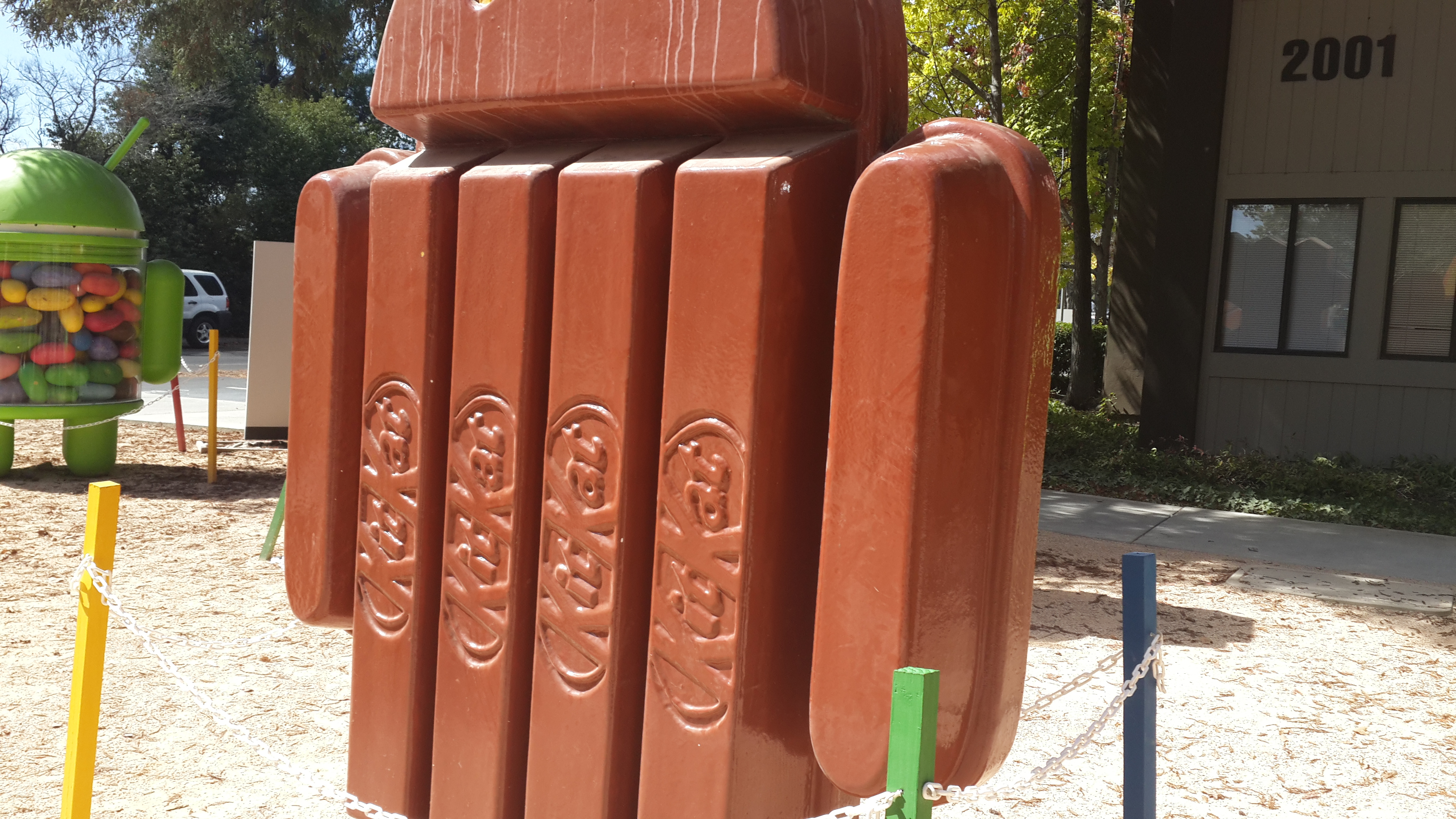
A Kit Kat bar statue at Googleplex Headquarters, United States

In September 2013, it was announced that version 4.4 of Google's Android mobile operating system would be named "KitKat". Google licensed the name from Nestlé, with no money changing hands. A promotion ran in numerous countries with specially branded Android Kit Kat bars to win Nexus 7 devices and Google Play Store credit.

=== Fairtrade ===
In December 2009, it was announced that the four-finger variety of Kit Kat would use Fairtrade chocolate (at least in Britain and Ireland) from January 2010. The Fairtrade Kit Kat promotion was extended to the two-finger edition in January 2010.

In June 2020, Nestlé announced that KitKat was to end its relationship with the non-profit organisation, Fairtrade, instead choosing to source its cocoa for KitKat chocolate bars from farms with a Rainforest Alliance accreditation.

=== Golden ticket draw ===
In the first three weeks of Big Brother Series 7 in the UK, Channel 4 conducted a promotion in conjunction with Nestlé to distribute 100 "golden tickets" randomly throughout Kit Kats, in a style reminiscent of the Charlie and the Chocolate Factory story. Members of the public finding these tickets were permitted to use them to give themselves a chance to become a Big Brother housemate and bypass the standard auditions process.

Golden ticket holders were invited to a television show where one of them, Susie Verrico, was chosen to enter the House by Aisleyne Horgan-Wallace, picking a ball out of a machine at random. This contest caused some controversy, with the Advertising Standards Authority saying that the terms and conditions of the draw should have been made clearer in related advertisements and that an independent adjudicator should have been present before and during the draw.

== Varieties ==
=== Flavours ===
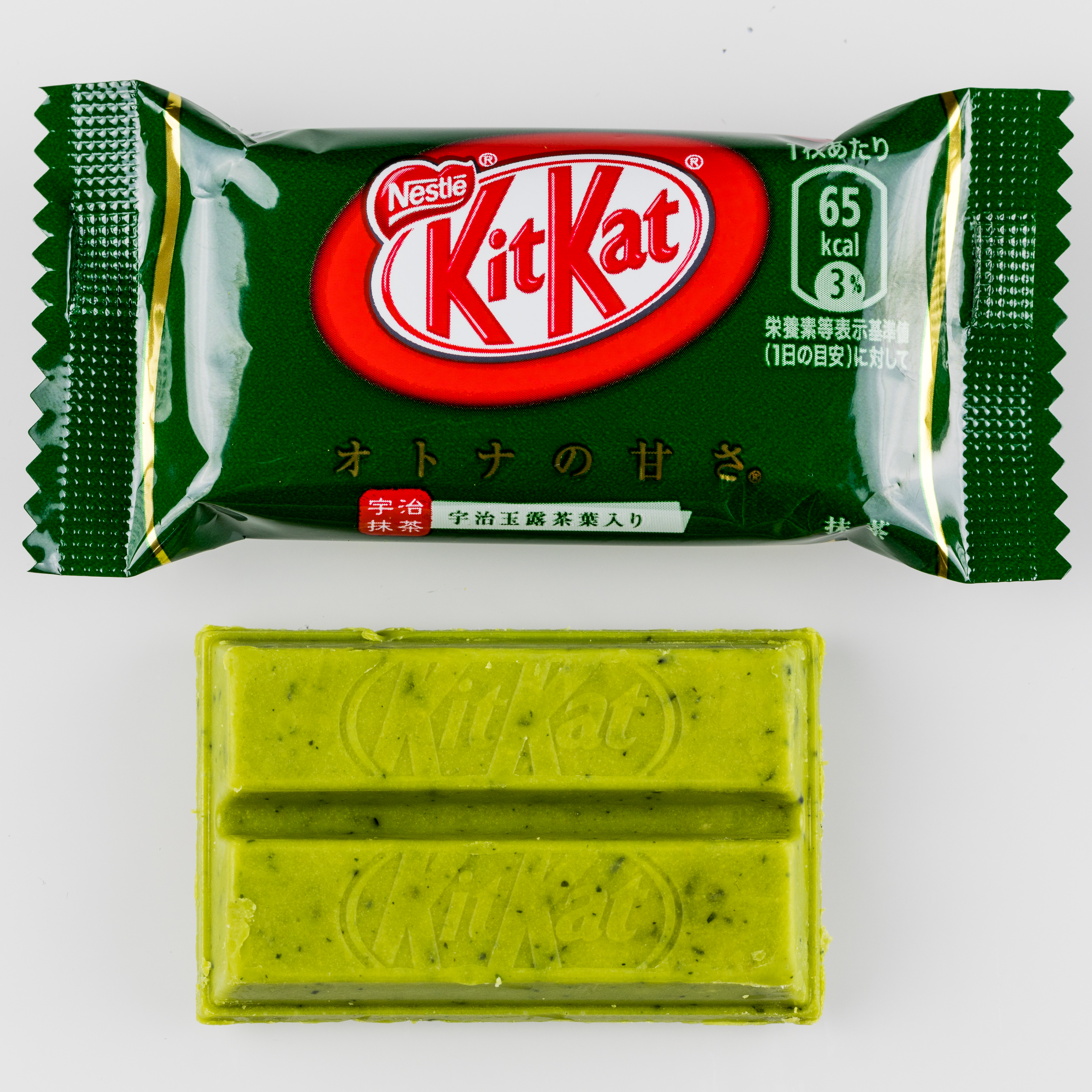
Kit Kat Matcha sold in Japan

Many varieties of Kit Kat have existed, either permanently or as limited editions, such as those sold to commemorate festivals such as Valentine's Day. Nestlé also tries to appeal to local tastes when creating new Kit Kat flavours. The company has introduced over 300 different flavours in Japan since 2000, including hot sauce, soy sauce, wasabi, apple cider vinegar, zunda, Ice cream, milk tea and cough drop. They have even introduced a range that require baking in an oven. The flavours are designed to appeal to younger buyers and are often bought as good-luck gifts as the brand name echoes the Japanese phrase "Kitto Katsu", roughly translating as "surely win." The Kit Kat Orange was the first flavour variant to be introduced in the United Kingdom, in 1996 and 1998 in Ireland. It was followed in 1997 by the Kit Kat Dark and Kit Kat Mint. All three were available as permanent editions of the two-finger multipack in the United Kingdom, along with the Kit Kat Original, the Kit Kat White and from 2012 the Kit Kat Cookies & Cream. There has also been Kit Kat Caramel.

A wide variety of promotional items exist, ranging from traditional merchandise (such as mugs, pens, oven gloves and tea-towels) to less common items such as coats for small dogs. In Japan, Kit Kats have come packaged with CD singles and a special limited edition double pack of Kit Kat Crispy Monogatari came bundled with a mini book featuring six short stories, one of which was written by Koji Suzuki, author of the Ring cycle series. In Japan, Kit Kats are also available in jars that are dispensed from vending machines.

Most flavours are not sold in the United States due to Hershey's policy of concentrating more on those variants that are popular in that country. Two new flavours, Lemon Crisp and Raspberry Creme, were introduced in the U.S. in 2020, available in regular sized bars or miniature bars. In 2020, Nestlé launched a new flavour, Scotch whisky KitKats, available only in Japan using chocolate aged for six months in whisky barrels in Scotland. In February 2021, the company announced it will be launching a vegan, dairy-free version of their popular KitKat product. The bar will be called KitKat V and it will be available in select countries in late 2021 and then expand worldwide.

=== Forms ===
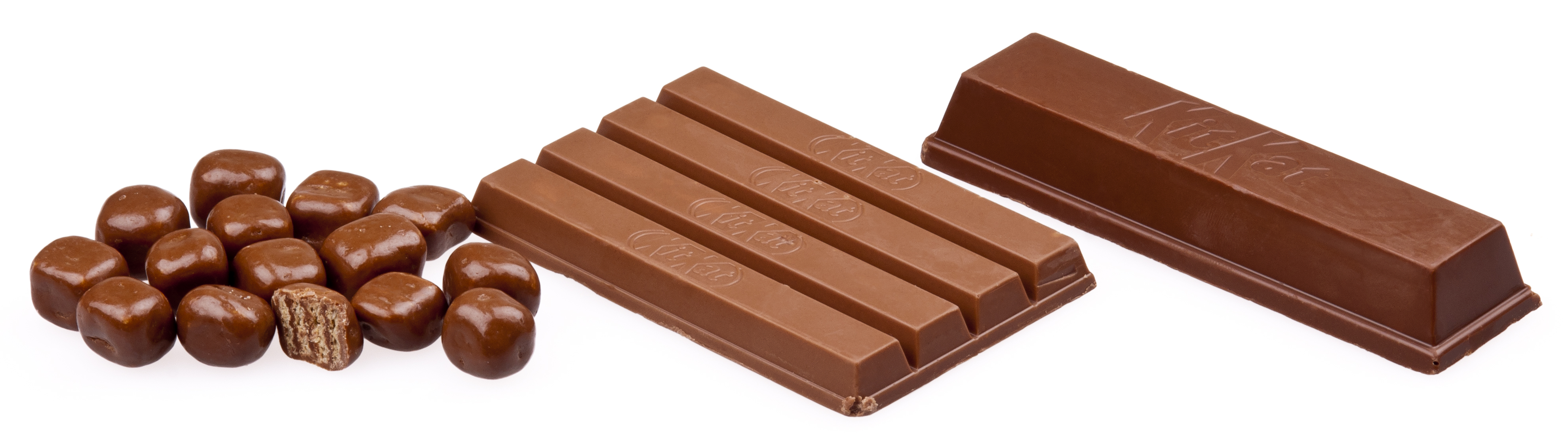
Kit Kat varieties: Pop Choc, regular and Chunky (or Big Kat)

The standard Kit Kat finger bars can come in a variety of presentations and nutritional values. The bars can come in a miniature form of two finger mini bars or a larger standard four or in some cases, three-fingered bars.

Originally, each finger was imprinted with the name 'Rowntree' in script form but this was subsequently changed to Kit Kat and remains so to this day. The standard size has been upgraded in several cases up to a 'monster Size' bar, which can include up to five or eight fingers. Large single-fingered Chunky Kit Kats were launched in the United Kingdom in 1998 and have been sold in a variety of flavours such as White Chocolate, Caramel, Hazelnut Cream and Peanut Butter. The market for Chunky Kit Kats has also expanded to Canada.

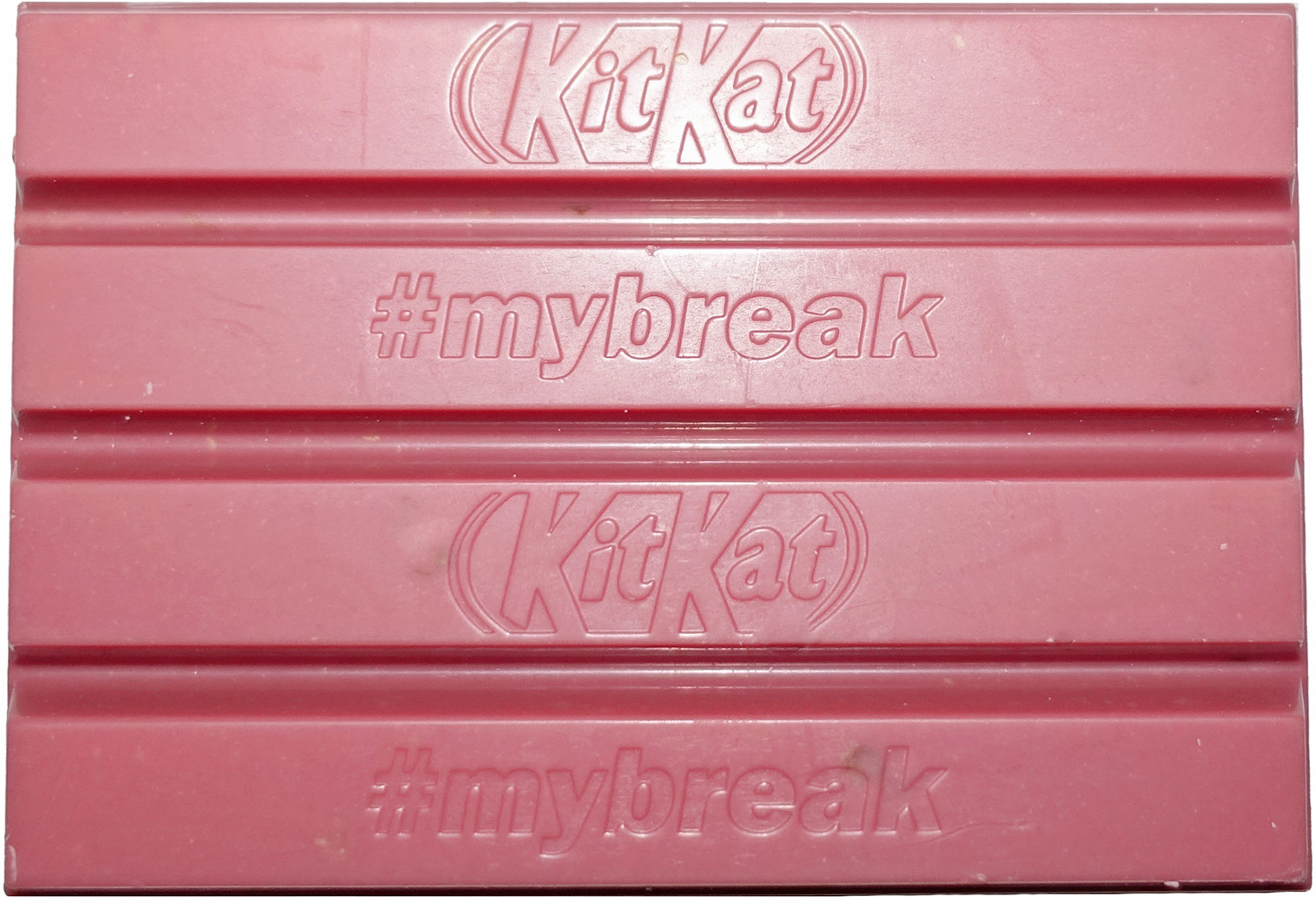
Pink coloured Kit Kat Ruby

Other forms and shapes include Choc'n'Go individually wrapped fingers in France, a twelve-finger Family Block available in New Zealand and Australia, round bite-sized Pop Choc pieces, square Kubes, praline-filled Senses, a yoghurt with Kit Kat pieces and a Kit Kat ice cream cone.

In the 1980s, a Kit Kat with five shorter fingers was sold in vending machines in the UK. The Japanese Bake 'N Tasty Mini Kit Kats Custard Pudding Flavour was launched in 2014. The bar must be baked in an oven before consumption and the surface sugar caramelises in the process.

In 2015, a new luxury and giftable variant of Kit Kat called Kit Kat Rubies was launched in Malaysia. Coming in a box of 20 small bars, the Kit Kat Rubies bar is made with the premium chocolate truffle cream and imported roasted hazelnut pieces.

As of 2017, US variants include the standard and king-size four-finger bars, standard bars covered with white or dark chocolate, snack-size orange-covered bars for Halloween (sold until 2021 and replaced with Breaking Bones starting in 2022), bagged wrapped one-finger miniatures (original and assorted), unwrapped minis, a redesigned Big Kat and a king-size Big Kat (two of the then-new Big Kat bars).

A Kit Kat breakfast cereal was launched in the United Kingdom in 2023.

== Chocolatory ==
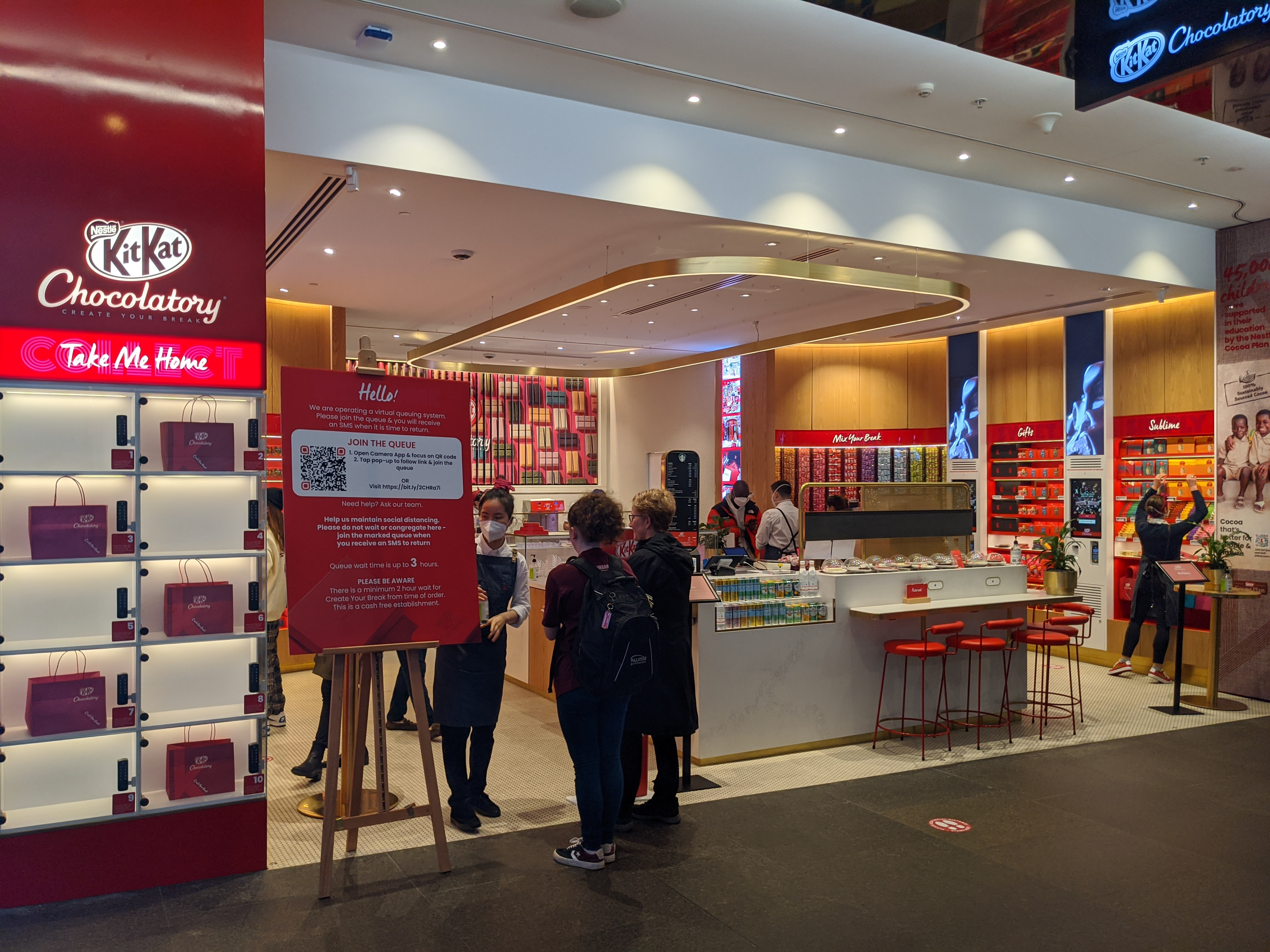
Kit Kat Chocolatory in Sydney, Australia

Kit Kat has opened a Chocolatory in the Melbourne Central Shopping Centre in Melbourne, Australia. There was also one in Sydney, however this was closed June 2024. The shops allow customers to use touch screens to create their own Kit Kat from a selection of chocolates and ingredients; they are made while the customers wait and customers can mix their own flavours with some Kit Kat that has been provided in the shop.

There are similar locations in Brazil, Japan and Canada.

== Criticisms and controversies ==
In March 2010, Kit Kat was targeted for a boycott by Greenpeace for using palm oil from Indonesia, which the environmental organisation claimed resulted in destruction of forest habitats for orangutans. A YouTube video by Greenpeace went viral and Nestlé announced a partnership with The Forest Trust to establish responsible sourcing guidelines and ensure that its products did not have a deforestation footprint. They aimed to achieve a fully sustainable method of palm oil harvesting by 2015. Nestlé stated that 58% of palm oil purchased in 2017 was certified responsibly sourced. By 2023 the figure was 100% with 96% being deforestation free. In 2025, West Papuan indigenous people called for a boycott of Kit Kat and other brands over alleged ecocide in their territory.

== Kit Kat cargo heist ==
In March 2026, Nestle reported the theft of approximately 12 tonnes (413,793 units) of its KitKat chocolate bars during transit from Italy to Poland. The shipment, destined for distribution across European markets, disappeared en route, with both the vehicle and its cargo nowhere to be found. The company indicated that the stolen goods could potentially enter unofficial sales channels, though each bar carries a unique batch code enabling traceability. Consumers and retailers were advised that scanning these codes could identify products from the stolen consignment and the company released an online tracking tool so people can check if their Kit Kats are from the heist. The stolen chocolate was from the new Formula 1 line, and was constructed like racing cars.

== Ingredients ==
Kit Kat filling was revealed to be (or at least contain) crushed up Kit Kat, in BBC Two's Inside the Factory. Original Kit Kat ingredients unless otherwise stated, listed by decreasing weight: milk chocolate (sugar, milk ingredients, cocoa butter, cocoa mass, whey powder, lactose, soya lecithin, polyglycerol polyricinoleate, natural flavour), wheat flour, sugar, modified palm oil, cocoa, sodium bicarbonate, soya lecithin, yeast and natural flavour.

=== Europe ===
Milk chocolate (66%) (sugar, cocoa butter, cocoa mass, dried whole milk, cocoa mass, lactose and proteins from whey, whey powder, emulsifier (sunflower lecithin), butterfat, flavouring), wheat flour, sugar, vegetable fat, cocoa mass, yeast, raising agent (sodium bicarbonate), salt, emulsifier (soya lecithin), flavourings.

In 2006, the UK four-finger Kit Kat contained 233 dietary calories (kcal) (975 kilojoules). In 2009, the two-finger Kit Kat contained 107 calories. In 2013, the UK Kit Kat Chunky contained 247 calories which reduced to 207 calories in 2015. This correlated to a reduction in weight by 19% from 48g to 40g.

=== United States ===
Hershey's Kit Kat Crisp Wafers in Chocolate contain sugar, wheat flour, cocoa butter, nonfat milk, chocolate, refined palm kernel oil, lactose (milk), milk fat, contains 2% or less of: soy lecithin, PGPR (emulsifier), yeast, artificial flavour, salt and sodium bicarbonate.

=== Canada ===
Milk chocolate (sugar, milk ingredients, cocoa butter, cocoa mass, whey powder, lactose, soya lecithin, polyglycerol polyricinoleate, natural flavour), wheat flour, sugar, modified palm oil, cocoa, sodium bicarbonate, soya lecithin, yeast, natural flavour.

Dark chocolate: cocoa mass, sugar, wheat flour, palm kernel, palm, coconut and vegetable oils, modified milk ingredients, cocoa butter, sunflower and soy lecithins, yeast, sodium bicarbonate, calcium sulphate, salt, protease, xylanase, natural flavours.

=== Asia ===
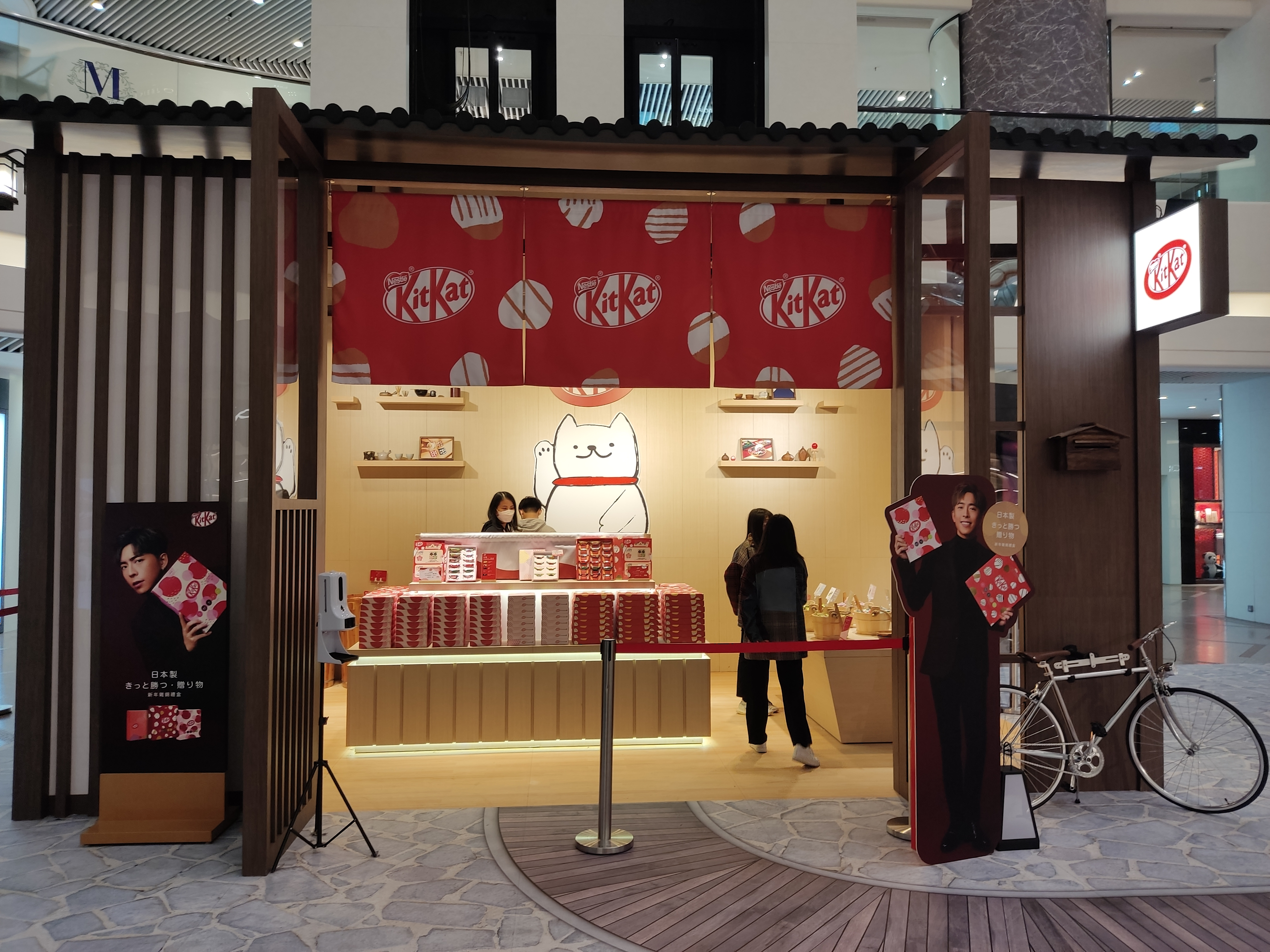
Kit Kat pop-up stall in Times Square, Hong Kong in 2022

In Japan, Kit Kats are produced at Nestlé-owned factories in Himeji and Kasumigaura. The milk chocolate used for Kit Kats is made from whole-milk powder and Nestlé buys most of its cacao beans from West Africa.

Nestlé has factories in various locations in China, to supply to China and Hong Kong. During the 2008 Chinese milk scandal, where melamine was found to have tainted some milk suppliers in China, importers in Hong Kong chose to import bars manufactured in the United Kingdom.

== See also ==
- Kit Kats in Japan
- Kit Kats in the United States
- Kvikk Lunsj
