= Unilever Gloucester =

Food manufacturing site in England

- Unilever Ice Cream, Gloucester Factory
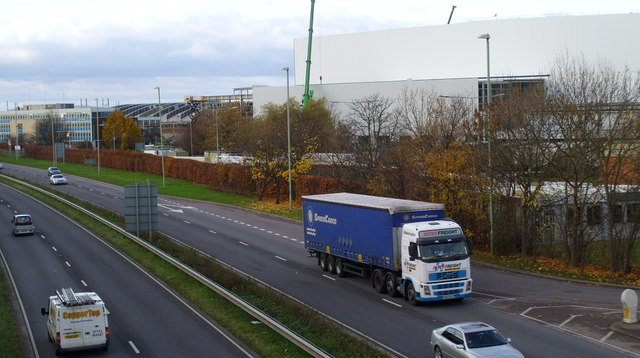
- Looking north-west from the footbridge over the A417 (for the Premier Inn Gloucester) in November 2008

- Location within Gloucestershire
- Former names: Cotswold Factory

General information
- Type: Ice cream factory
- Architectural style: Factory
- Location: Corinium Avenue, Barnwood, Gloucestershire, GL4 3BW
- Coordinates: 51.867°N 2.2014°W
- Elevation: 25 m (82 ft)
- Current tenants: 500 staff
- Construction started: 1959
- Completed: 1962
- Cost: £4m (1962)
- Client: Unilever
- Owner: Unilever UK

Dimensions
- Other dimensions: 74 acres

Unilever Gloucester is a large food manufacturing site in Gloucester, south west England, that produces all of the makes of Unilever ice cream for the UK.

== History ==
=== Construction ===
The site was built by Unilever from 1959. The site was officially announced on Tuesday 16 April 1962.

No ice cream was made by the company during World War II. In March 1958 Unilever had approached Gloucester Corporation for a site of 20-30 acres, to employ around 400-500 people. Gloucester was chosen as the Gloster Aircraft Company had recently closed.

Construction began February 1959. Previously Unilever made ice cream in Edinburgh, Godley, Greater Manchester, and London, but could not keep up. A cold store next door, with the area of a football pitch, held 750,000 gallons of ice cream, which at the time was worth £1m.

The plant consumed 53,000 gallons of milk, 20,000 gallons of liquid sugar and 25 tonnes of butter per week. The wafer factory produced a billion wafers per year.

The Edinburgh plant at Craigmillar closed in October 1962, but the cold store remained, to supply the seven depots in Scotland.

=== World production ===
Unilever is the world's largest manufacturer of ice cream, and also has large manufacturing sites in Hellendoorn in the Netherlands, Saint-Dizier in France and Caivano in Italy. Nestle and Unilever have about a third of the global production each.

The site was built to supply 25 million people in the west and north of England, and Wales. In the 1960s the site had over 1,000 employees, and was the world's largest ice cream factory. When opening, the site could produce 90,000 gallons of ice cream a day and 2 million lollies a day.

Unilever Gloucester is the second-largest in Europe, after Unilever Heppenheim in Heppenheim, in south-west Germany; 70% of Heppenheim's production supplies Germany, Austria and Switzerland; the site opened in 1960. Unilever has ten ice-cream plants across Europe. The Scandinavians eat the most ice-cream in Europe, followed by the Germans. Heppenheim has 625 employees, and Magnum production requires the milk of 6,000 cows a day, producing up to 450 a minute. Unilever turned over 48 billion euros in Germany in 2014.

The Ben & Jerry's ice-cream sold in the UK is made in the Netherlands, not Gloucester, producing a million tubs per day; Unilever bought the Netherlands site in 1985, making Ben & Jerry's ice-cream from 2002.

=== 1980s ===
Over five years in the late 1980s, £60m was invested on the site. In the mid-1980s £45m was invested to put all UK ice cream manufacture at the plant, to be the biggest ice cream plant in Europe. Plants in Acton and Eastbourne closed.

A new £42m factory, on a 4-acre site, was built in the mid-1980s. The Phoenix Factory opened in early July 1987, at the eastern end of the site, adding 300 staff.

=== 1990s ===
The site became 74 acres, with 1,200 staff. In 1993 the site consumed 150 million litres of milk per year. It could make 340 Mini Milk lollies per minute.

In the early 1990s, Mars UK entered ice-cream production. Under division chairman Simon Rhodes, Unilever developed a new product, Magnum, but the head of Unilever UK strongly questioned whether customers would pay 80p for 'a glorified choc ice', as it had Belgian chocolate and real dairy ice cream. But despite much reservations by Unilever management on the increased cost of production, Magnum became the UK's best seller in one year, and has been for thirty years; without that intervention and innovation from Mars UK, the Unilever Magnum product would not have needed to have been developed. In response to British sales of Häagen-Dazs, Unilever introduced production of Ben & Jerry's, when Unilever bought the company in April 2000.{citation needed}

The site was one of four main factories in Europe that could make more than 100 million litres per year. It made 110,000 tonnes of ice cream a year.

In 1996 Nestlé complained to the OFT that Unilever operated unfair practices. and Mars also complained that Unilever had exclusive deals with food distribution networks, that gave Unilever 70% of the UK ice cream production. The OFT investigation was from July 1997.

In the 1990s Nestlé UK made its ice creams at Hortonwood in Telford, employing around 200 people, until October 2001, when Nestlé sold the ice-cream division, and the Telford site closed on November 2 2001.

In the late 1997 the original Cotswold factory closed; it was making the much-loved Arctic roll product, with around eighty redundancies; the site was largely totally redeveloped from the original 1960s site; automation was now advanced. 84 staff had worked at the Cotswold factory.

From January 1998 the company started weekend shifts. Before 1997, it had been Monday to Friday only. The site operated total productive maintenance.

In August 1998 the company was told to change its distribution 'sweetener' deals by March 1999.

=== Visits ===
- Nine MPs visited on Wednesday 15 May 1963; twelve were intending to visit; lunch was held at the Greenway Hotel in Shurdington; one of the nine MPs was John Biffen
- Ninety seven people of the TUC General Congress visited on Thursday 21 November 1963, including Sidney Greene, Baron Greene of Harrow Weald,
- A group from the WHO visited on Wednesday 11 November 1964
- In June 1987 12 year old Elizabeth Spooner of Maidenhead visited, as part of Jim'll Fix It; it was broadcast on Saturday 16 January 1988, with manager John Hazelwood appearing in the studio
- Minister for Industry, Douglas Hogg, visited on Thursday 24 May 1990
- Food minister David Maclean, Baron Blencathra visited on Wednesday 15 January 1992
- Union leader Bill Jordan, Baron Jordan visited in July 1994
- Food minister Frederick Curzon, 7th Earl Howe visited in January 1995
- On Friday 3 March 1995, the site was visited by the Queen and the Duke of Edinburgh; the Queen had arrived at Cheltenham Spa railway station and visited the nearby GCHQ site (in the west of Cheltenham) at 10.30am, and she planted a commemorative tree at the Unilever factory, leaving from Staverton airport on the Royal Flight.
- Thursday 29 May 1997, the Bishop of Gloucester, David Bentley, visited for three hours, with his wife Clarice
- In 2015, as part of an hour-long documentary on milk production in Buckinghamshire, Cherry Healey saw the production of Magnum ice-creams, broadcast on 7 May 2015 on BBC2
- In 2022 the site production was shown on the Channel 4 documentary The Secret World of Ice Cream on 18 September 2022, which featured the Mars UK executives Ford Ennals, and Bill Ronald, and Unilever R&D chief, from 2000 to 2006, Don Darling

=== Managers ===
- 1960s, Robert Dayer-Smith, of Prestbury
- 1980s, John Gore Hazelwood, awarded the CBE in the 1994 New Year Honours, educated at Downing College, Cambridge, and Framlingham College
- May 1997, Stuart Lowthian

=== Former employees ===
- Unilever chief chemist in the 1960s was Sigismund Herschdörfer, he travelled to England in 1935 with his wife Grete Markstein; her son was George Markstein, who created the iconic, and influential, series The Prisoner
- Sigismund Herschdörfer, of Bedford, was appointed the chief chemist of T.Wall & Son in February 1953, replacing George Searle, who had been chief chemist for thirty years; Herschdörfer studied chemistry at the University of Vienna, and was responsible for new techniques being deployed at the Gloucester factory

== Structure ==
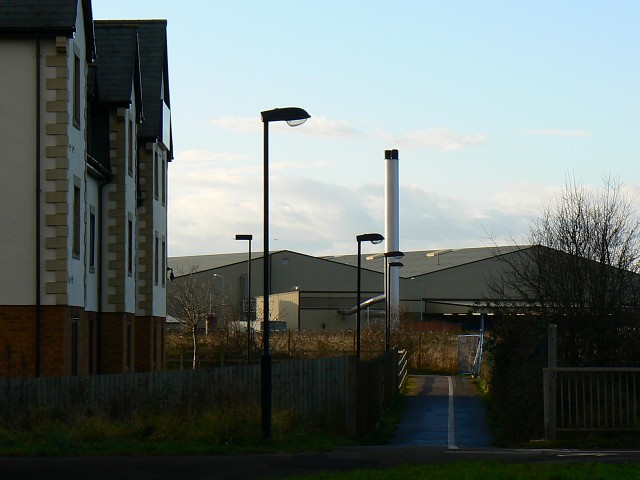
Rear of factory, and its proximity to the neighbouring Premier Inn, in December 2008

In the 1960s there was a two-storey office and production buildings, and a cone and wafer factory called Embisco. The site was opened as the Cotswold Factory.

The site runs 24 hours a day, all week. The site is situated on the A417, to the west of the large A40 roundabout. It is around a mile west of junction 11a of the M5, and situated to the east of the main Cross Country Route railway.

The site employs over 500 people.

=== Production ===
The site makes around 5m Cornetto products and about 10m Magnum products a week. It makes around 1.5 billion ice cream products a year.

By 1995 it was the second-largest ice-cream producer in Unilever; with the addition of three more lines, it became the world's largest ice-cream plant in 1996.

33 tons of 'Romantica' was sent to Germany, every three days, in 1997.

In 1997 the UK spent £843m on ice-cream. Germany spent £1.3bn, and Italy £2.9bn. 30% of output from the Gloucester factory was exported.

- Cornetto began in July 1976
- The Arctic roll was made there, after production moved from Eastbourne in the 1980s
- It began making chocolate ice creams for Cadbury in March 1994
- A development in 1996 allowed the site to make frozen bakery products, such as croissants

== See also ==
- Arla Aylesbury
- Fruit and Vegetable Preservation Research Station, also in Gloucestershire
- Company Profile, Dun and Bradstreet
- Company Profile - Bloomberg
