= Britain's Favourite Supermarket Foods =

Television series

- Genre: Food
- Presented by: Cherry Healey
- Country of origin: United Kingdom
- Original language: English
- No. of episodes: 3

Production
- Running time: 60 minutes
- Production company: BBC Scotland

Original release
- Network: BBC One
- Release: 15 February 2012 – 25 July 2013

Britain's Favourite Supermarket Foods is a British documentary series which was first broadcast on BBC One on 15 February 2012 as a one-off special. The programme returned on 18 July 2013 and aired for two episodes. Presented by Cherry Healey, the programme investigates some of the UK's favourite supermarket foods, revealing their secrets and unexpected powers.

== Reception ==
Lucy Mangan of The Guardian described the documentary as a "bag of utter balls", criticising its presentation of the subject matter and simplistic style, but commending Healey's enthusiasm. Robert James Taylor, writing for the Shropshire Star, described it as "a painful experience" and "mind-bogglingly dumb". However, Simon Usborne of The Independent described the documentary as a "public service pill...worth swallowing" for its presentation of useful dietary advice.
