= Manchester Plant =

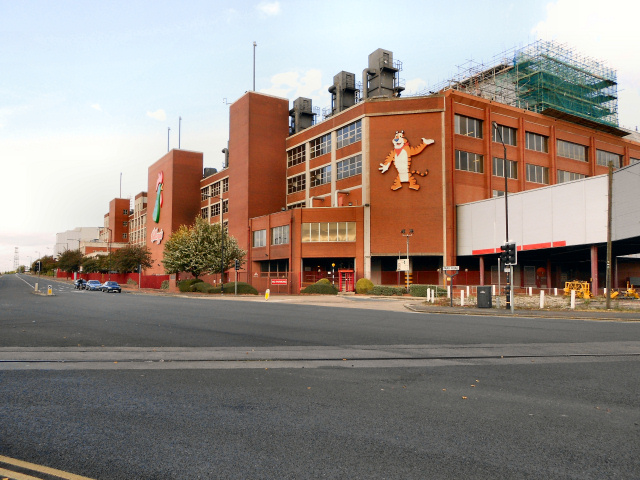
- The factory entrance in September 2011

- Location within Greater Manchester
- Alternative names: Manchester Factory

General information
- Type: Cereals factory
- Architectural style: Factory
- Location: Stretford, M32 8RA
- Coordinates: 53°27′24″N 02°18′59″W
- Elevation: 20 m (66 ft)
- Current tenants: The Kellogg Company of Great Britain
- Completed: 1938
- Inaugurated: 24 May 1938
- Client: The Kellogg Company of Great Britain

The Manchester Plant is a large food factory in North West England; during World War II, it was the largest food factory in Europe. It is devoted to manufacturing Kellogg's cereal and related products.

== History ==
American Will Keith Kellogg (who died in October 1951) was part of the Seventh-day Adventist Church, and a strict vegetarian. Other famous food industry families have had noted strong links to a sect of the Christian church.

In 1935, All-Bran was imported from Canada.

During the Second World War, the site's production was only sold to the North, Scotland and the Midlands.

The factory was damaged by high winds at the end of February 1949. It suffered a gas explosion in a basement on Saturday 15 July 1950. The production manager, Joseph Askew, died suddenly at home, on Poplar Road in Stretford, on 3 February 1956, aged 58.

During food rationing, the US owner would fly in parcels of food, for all the staff, in the week before Christmas, on an aircraft from Dublin, with a turkey and Christmas pudding for each employee. After rationing stopped, the company continued the tradition, for some years. By 1960, the site was making 1.25 million boxes per day.

The other £14m production site in north Wales opened on 28 April 1978; construction had started in July 1976.

Around three hundred workers were made redundant in 1981, due to automation and a £5.5m investment.

=== Construction ===
The site was essentially chosen due to the proximity to the Manchester Ship Canal, built by The Kellogg Company of Great Britain; the site in Manchester was chosen by Harry McEvoy (c.1902 - 3 November 1984), the managing director. It was the largest food manufacturing factory in Europe. It was built in ten months.

On Thursday 17 June 1937 construction started, the first factory on the new Barton Dock Estate, owned by the Manchester Ship Canal Company. It would cost £250,000. The granary could store 500,000 tons of grain, with eight grain stores, 130 ft high, 30 ft wide, and built in only nine days. All of the raw materials came from the British Empire, with the white corn for Corn Flakes grown in South Africa. The factory was expected to open at the end of February 1938.

The £500,000 five floor site opened on 24 May 1938, which was Empire Day, the birthday of Queen Victoria. It was opened by a woman from north Nottinghamshire, from 22 Second Avenue, Edwinstowe; her husband worked at the nearby Thoresby Colliery. The factory was the largest cereal factory in the British Empire, covering seven acres. She had six children, and had been chosen in April 1938 from around five thousand applicants on Wednesday 27 April 1938.

McEvoy would be chairman of the Cereal Foods Manufacturing Association from the start until 1967.

The huge illuminated K sign, was switched on on 24 November 1981, being 60 ft long. A new UK headquarters was built in the late 1980s next to Old Trafford Cricket Ground on Talbot Road, with 400 staff, costing £2m.

By the late 1980s, the factory was seven times larger, and the second-largest breakfast cereal factory in the world.

=== Visits ===
Prince Philip visited on Friday 14 June 1963, where he met the same Nottinghamshire woman, now aged 70, who had opened the site in May 1938; she now lived in Breaston in south-east Derbyshire. The site was now 18 acres. He had visited Leigh Boys' Grammar School in the morning, and two other Manchester factories, leaving Liverpool Airport at 6.20pm.

On Wednesday 22 May 1974, the factory was visited by the Prince of Wales.

Margaret Thatcher, as Prime Minister, visited on the afternoon of Friday 15 January 1982. Mrs Thatcher had been warmly greeted earlier on the same day when she visited the University of Salford, with around three hundred students carrying black flags, and a draped coffin. She had visited the area by plane at Manchester Airport on a Royal Air Force aircraft, arriving back in north-west London at 6.30pm.

On Sunday 5 January 2020, Channel 5 showed Secrets of the Kellogg's Factory, with food historian Polly Russell.

BBC Two made an hour-long documentary on Tuesday 26 July 2016, looking at the production of Crunchy Nut, interviewing Professor of Nutrition Louise Dye and food historian Seren Evans-Charrington; the production of Coco Pops, made with Arborio rice; the addition of vitamin D with Professor of Immunology Adrian Martineau and nutritionist Angelique Panagos, and how from October to April in the UK there is not enough sunshine to make vitamin D.

Food Unwrapped, with Kate Quilton of Channel 4 shown on Monday 7 September 2015 series 6 episode 2, visited the factory, to investigate how vitamins and iron were added to Cornflakes, where a nutritionist showed Kate that Cornflakes floating on water could be attracted by a magnet; the programme was made by Ricochet.

On Sunday 10 April 2022, Channel 4 showed an hour-long documentary about the factory, with Amalia Diamanti of Greece, of Kellogg's research and development, with series editor Anushka Roberts, made by HLP Studios.

=== Incidents ===
On Thursday 11 August 1955, 28-year-old Harold Grupwell was caught in a revolving bran cooker, and killed.

On the night of Sunday 22 October 1967, the site had a large fire, with 150 firemen attending.

In May 1977, 1,400 factory workers went on strike.

On Sunday 9 September 1979, workers went back to work after a ten-week strike, after accepting a £8.50 a week pay rise.

== Production ==
Corn arrives at the Dacsa Group site at Liverpool docks, and takes around one hour and twenty minutes to get to the factory. 200 tonnes of corn arrives each day, from Argentina, processing around ten tonnes of Corn Flakes each hour.

150 tonnes of Arborio rice arrives each day from Italy and Spain.

It makes a million packets of cereal a day. It makes 21,000 tonnes of Coco Pops each year.

For Crunchy Nut, each day it requires 10 tonnes of nuts and 3 tonnes of honey.

== Distribution ==
The distribution centre is guided by automated guided vehicles, made by Dematic.

The site is alongside the north-south A5181, at the T-junction with the B5211. Its main warehouse is further to the west, along the B5211.

== Energy production ==
In December 2005, a contract for a 5MW cogeneration (CHP) unit on the site was awarded to Elyo Industrial Ltd (now called Industrial Energy Services Ltd).

== See also ==
- Worksop Factory
