= Fruit and Vegetable Preservation Research Station =

- FVBRS
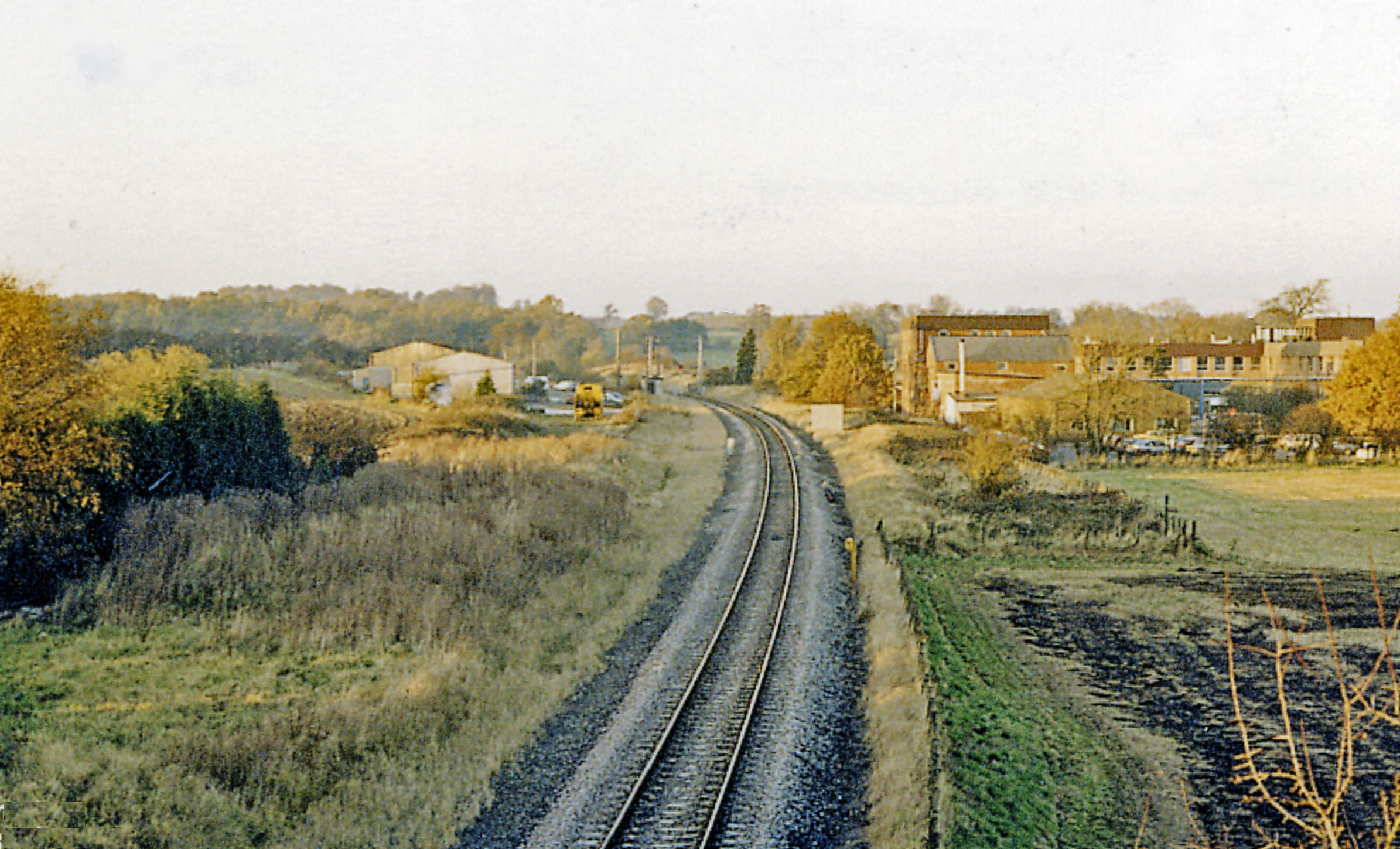
- Site next to the former railway station in November 1988

- Location within Gloucestershire

General information
- Type: Food Research Centre
- Location: Ebrington, Gloucestershire, GL55 6LD
- Coordinates: 52.055°N 1.754°W
- Elevation: 120 m (394 ft)
- Completed: 1919
- Client: University of Bristol

The Fruit and Vegetable Preservation Research Station (FVPRS) was a former British government research institute, now a private research company, that has made important industry-wide advances in food preservation, notably canning.

== History ==
The institute, founded in 1919, originally worked with the University of Bristol. The British fruit canning industry mostly began from around 1926. The site found a method to can peas that prevented the peas from turning yellow, retaining the green colour. It worked in the 1930s with Sir Edgar Jones of the National Food Canning Council.

It became an independent private research company for the vegetable and fruit industry from 16 August 1952.

It merged with a brewing research company from Surrey in September 2008.

=== Visits ===
The Duke of Kent visited on Wednesday 16 November 1994, with Sir Henry Elwes; the Duke was representing the British Overseas Trade Board. The Princess of Wales opened a new building on Thursday June 27, 1996. Anne, Princess Royal attended an annual lecture lunch on Wednesday June 9, 2004.

== Structure ==
The private company is situated in the Cotswolds in Gloucestershire, next to the Cotswold Line, next to a level crossing.

=== Testing ===
The site is one of the two main sites in the UK for food safety testing; the other is in northern Surrey.

In May 2005, it was one of only two British labs that could test for illegal dyes in paprika, chilli powder and turmeric. Para red and Rhodamine B had been found in supermarket own brands and Old El Paso spice products.

=== Training ===
In recent years, the site has run training courses. The research company also runs customer focus groups for the food and drink industry, to test new products; since 2015 this has been at Royal Leamington Spa in Warwickshire.

== See also ==
- Fernhurst Research Station in West Sussex
- Unilever Gloucester
