= Kit Kats in the United States =

Chocolate bar manufactured by Hershey's

US logo used since 2024.

The Hershey Company is the exclusive manufacturer of Kit Kat chocolate bars in the United States. Hershey first signed its perpetual licensing agreement with Kit Kat's original global manufacturer Rowntree's in 1970. Hershey's competitor Nestlé had to honor the agreement when it acquired Rowntree's in 1988. Hershey continues to produce and market Kit Kat independently from Nestlé in other countries.

Hershey's Kit Kat Crisp Wafers in Chocolate contain sugar, wheat flour, cocoa butter, nonfat milk, chocolate, refined palm kernel oil, lactose (milk), milk fat, contains 2% or less of: soy lecithin, PGPR (emulsifier), yeast, artificial flavor, salt, and sodium bicarbonate. Since 1986 in the US, the jingle used in television advertisements includes the phrase “Gimme a break, Gimme a break, Break me off a piece of that Kit Kat bar!"

== History ==
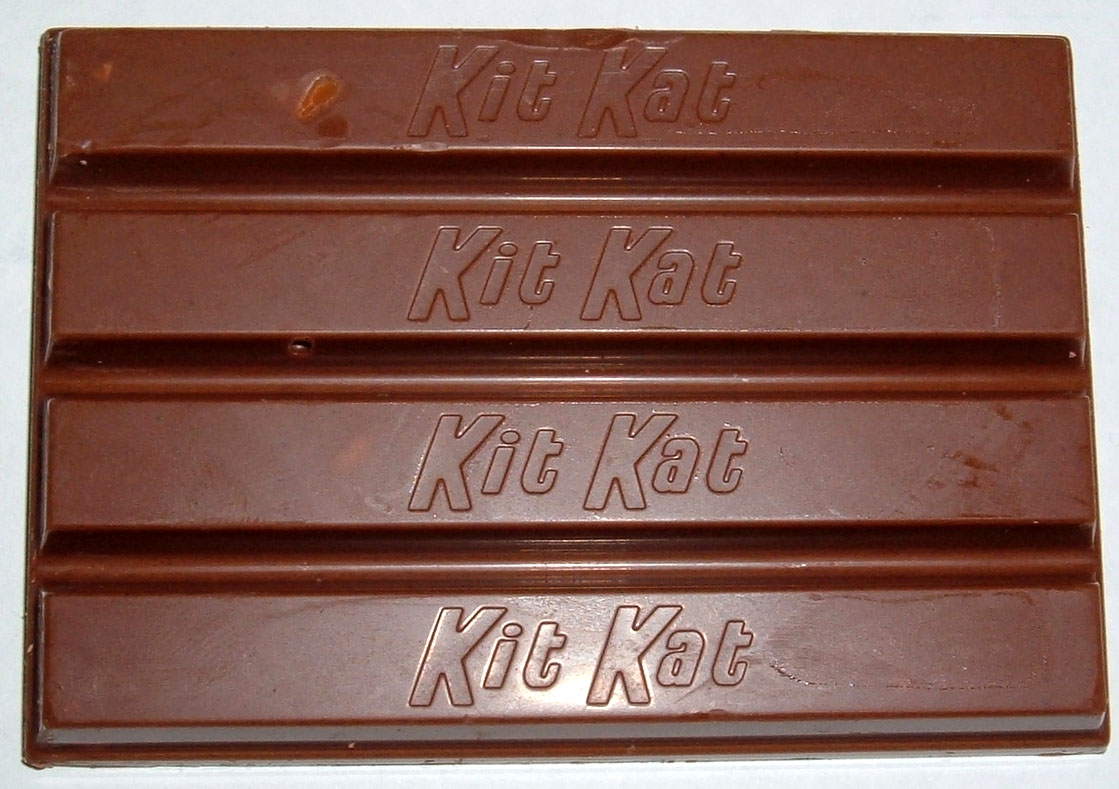
US chocolate bar

Kit Kat first appeared in the United States in 1957. Rowntree's then signed a perpetual agreement with Hershey in 1970 to distribute the Kit Kat brand in the US. As the part of the deal, Hershey began manufacturing the Kit Kat bar at its facility in Hershey, Pennsylvania. The agreement includes a "change of control" clause that allows the deal to terminate if Hershey is sold.

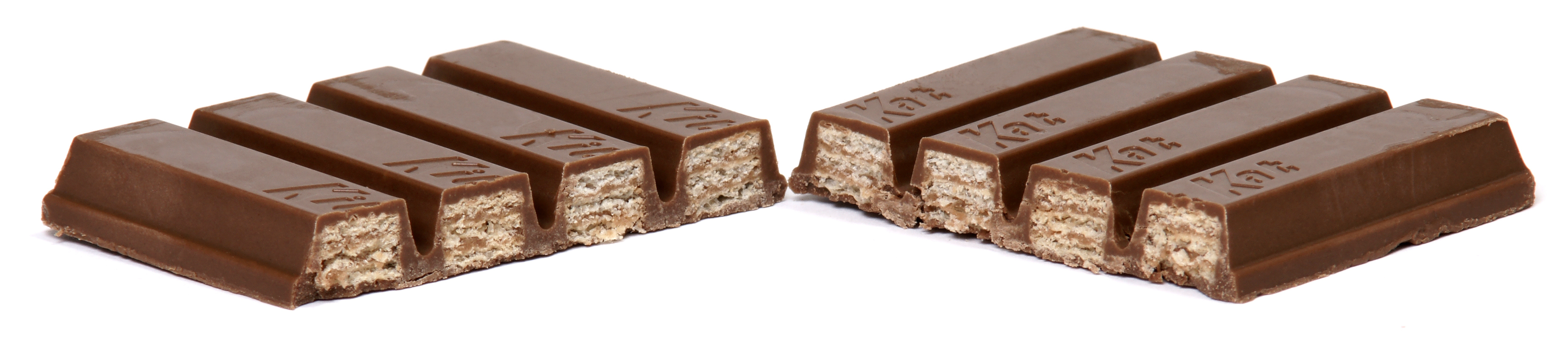
4-fingered Kit Kat split in half

In June 1988, Swiss company Nestlé acquired Kit Kat through the purchase of Rowntree's, giving Nestlé global control over the brand, except in the US. Nestlé, which has a substantial presence in the US, had to honor the licensing agreement when it bought Rowntree in 1988. As Kit Kat is one of Hershey's top five brands in the US market, the Kit Kat license was a key factor in Hershey's failed attempt to attract a serious buyer in 2002, and even Nestlé rejected Hershey's asking price, feeling that the economics would not work.

Nestlé's sale of its US confectionery business to Ferrara Candy Company in 2018 did not impact the Kit Kat bar, and thus rights would revert directly to Nestlé and not Ferrara in the event of a sale of Hershey.

The traditional bar has four fingers which each measure approximately 1 centimetre (0.4 in) by 9 centimetres (3.5 in). A two-finger bar was launched in the 1930s, and has remained the company's best-selling chocolate bar brand ever since. The 2001 Kit Kat Big Kat has one large finger approximately 2.5 centimetres (1 in) wide.

As dark chocolate has seen increased demand and favor worldwide because of its purported health benefits, Hershey had sold the four-finger Kit Kat Dark in the US several years previously as a limited edition, and began doing so again.

On March 9, 2018, Hershey broke ground to expand its Kit Kat manufacturing facility in Hazle Township, Pennsylvania. The expansion project has a $60 million budget and is expected to create an additional 111 jobs at the facility.

== Design ==
When first bought to the United States in 1957, the original Rowntree's Kit Kat bar had a red wrapper, and was manufactured in England until 1970. Since its introduction into the US in the 1970s, the Hershey's Kit Kat packaging and advertising has differed from the branding used in every other country where it was sold. In 2002, Hershey Kit Kats adopted the slanted ellipse logo used worldwide by Nestlé, though the ellipse was red and the text white.

Before the late 1990s, the product was traditionally wrapped in silver foil and an outer paper band. In the late 1990s, this was changed to flow wrap plastic.

== Marketing ==
US logo used until 2005.

The "classic" American version of the "Gimme a Break" Kit Kat jingle (in use in the US since 1986) was written by Ken Shuldman (copy) and Michael A. Levine (music) for the DDB Advertising Agency. Versions of the original have been covered by Carrie Underwood, Shawn Colvin, and many studio singers, as well as people who have appeared on-camera in the commercials. The jingle was cited in a study by University of Cincinnati researcher James J. Kellaris as one of the top ten "earworms" – bits of melody that become stuck in your head.

Another version of the advertising jingle 'Gimme a break' created for Kit Kat "Factory" commercial in the US was an original recording by Andrew W.K. W.K. was hired to write a new musical version for their "Gimme a break" slogan. Variations on the Andrew W.K. advertisement included executive dance routines in corporate offices and a network newsroom. However, the "classic" song has also been used again since the newer version first aired in 2004.

== Varieties ==
Hershey does not produce many of the Kit Kat varieties that Nestlé sells in other countries, instead concentrating on only those few variants that are popular in the United States. Hershey introduced two new flavors in 2020: Lemon Crisp and Raspberry Creme. The new flavors are available in regular sized bars or miniature bars.

=== Forms ===
As of 2017, US variants include the standard and king-size four-finger bars, standard bars covered with white or dark chocolate, snack-size orange-covered bars for Halloween (sold until 2021 and replaced with Breaking Bones starting in 2022), bagged wrapped one-finger miniatures (original and assorted), unwrapped minis, a redesigned Big Kat, and a king-size Big Kat (two of the then-new Big Kat bars).

A Kit Kat breakfast cereal was launched in the United States by General Mills in 2023.

=== Additional varieties ===
- Milk Chocolate
- White Chocolate
- Dark Chocolate
- Birthday Cake
- Lemon Crisp
- Raspberry Creme

== See also ==
- Hershey bar
