= Cherry Healey =

British television host

- Education: Cheltenham Ladies' College
- Alma mater: Royal Central School of Speech and Drama
- Occupation: Television presenter
- Years active: 2009–present
- Spouse: Roly Allen (m. 2010–2016)
- Children: 2

Cherry Kathleen Healey (born 1980 as Cherry Kathleen Chadwyck-Healey) is a British television presenter, frequently featuring in self-titled lifestyle documentaries on the BBC.

== Early life ==
Healey is the daughter of Nicholas Gerald Chadwyck-Healey (son of Sir Charles Arthur Chadwyck-Healey, 4th Baronet) and Alison Jill, daughter of Dr N. Stevens, of Morris House, Thaxted, Essex. She has three brothers. She attended Cheltenham Ladies' College until 1999.

== Career ==
Best known for her work with documentaries on BBC Three, including studies on drinking, childbirth, body issues, dating, and money, Healey frequently relates documentaries to her own life both during the programmes and on her blog on the BBC website. She presented a mini-series called Britain's Favourite Supermarket Foods on BBC One.

From 2015 until 2019, Healey presented the E4 spin-off The Jump: On the Piste.

In 2018, Healey was a co-founder of The Hotbed Collective podcast, along with writer Anniki Sommerville and journalist Lisa Williams.

Healey has also written for several publications including Grazia, You Me Baby magazine, and Cellardoor online.

She has co-presented eight series of Inside the Factory for BBC Two alongside Gregg Wallace. In 2016, Healey took part in Celebrity MasterChef on BBC One. In 2017–2018 her BBC series Find My First Love is being syndicated in the US on FYI.

== Personal life ==
From 2010 to 2016, Healey was married to Roly Allen. They have a daughter, born 2009, and a son, born 2013.

== Television work ==
Year	Title	Role	Notes
2025	The Air Fryer Diet: Lose Weight, Cook Fast	Presenter	2 episodes
2024	Richard Osman's House of Games	Contestant	5 episodes
2024	SAS: Who Dares Wins	Contestant	7 episodes
2022	Women's Health: Breaking the Taboos	Presenter	4 episodes
2021—	10 Years Younger in 10 Days	Presenter	
2017	The Truth About...	Presenter	
2017	The Best of British Takeaways	Presenter	
2017	The Health Detectives	Presenter	
2016—	Find My First Love	Presenter	
2016	Celebrity MasterChef	Participant	
2016—	What to Buy and Why	Presenter	1 series
2015	The Jump: On the Piste	Presenter	2 series
2015—	Inside the Factory	Co-presenter	10 series
2015	Britain's Supermarket Revolution: What's in It for Us?	Presenter	1 episode
2013	Cherry Healey: Old Before My Time	Herself	3 episodes
2013	Secrets of the Sales	Herself	1 episode
2013	Cherry Healey's Property Virgins	Herself	2 episodes
2013	The Year of Making Love	Herself	6 episodes
2012–2013	Britain's Favourite Supermarket Foods	Herself	3 episodes
2012	Cherry Healey: How to Get a Life	Herself	6 episodes
2012	Cherry Healey: Like A Virgin	Herself	1 episode
2011	Cherry's Parenting Dilemmas	Herself	1 episode
2011	Cherry's Body Dilemmas	Herself	1 episode
2011	Cherry's Cash Dilemmas	Herself	1 episode
2011	Cherry Healey: Magician's Assistant	Herself	1 episode
2011	Is Breast Best? Cherry Healey Investigates	Herself	1 episode
2010	Cherry Gets Married	Herself	1 episode
2010	Cherry Goes Dating	Herself	1 episode
2010	Cherry Goes Drinking	Herself	1 episode
2010	Cherry Gets Pierced	Herself	1 episode
2010	Cherry Has A Baby	Herself	1 episode
2009	Drinking with the Girls	Herself	1 episode
