= Plant Protection Limited =

Plant Protection Ltd was a joint venture formed in June 1937 between ICI and Cooper, McDougall & Robertson in the United Kingdom. The share capital was £1900. The new company had offices at 61 Curzon Street, London, but the manufacturing plant and technical staff were based at Yalding in Kent. ICI contributed the research facilities at Jealott's Hill in Berkshire. Coopers provided the commercial expertise, and the joint venture lasted until 1958, when ICI bought out Cooper, McDougall & Robertson, and Plant Protection Ltd became the ICI Plant Protection Division, a wholly owned subsidiary of ICI.

In 1949 Plant Protection Ltd began to publish a series of gardening books, focusing on plant diseases that could be treated with chemical products, including colour illustrations of pests and diseases. The first volume was Fruit Growing for Amateurs. No volume author is credited: the series editor, N. P. Harvey, appears to have written the text. The illustrations are from watercolours by Dorothy Fitchew.
