= Woodmansterne (company) =

Headquarters in Watford, UK in 2026

Woodmansterne Publications is a British publishing company that prints greeting cards, based in Watford, Hertfordshire. As of 2018 it printed around 30 million cards per year.

It was founded by Graham Woodmansterne in 1953, initially as a publisher of souvenir colour slides; born Sutton-Smith, he changed his name to Woodmansterne because he enjoyed growing up in the village Woodmansterne as a child. As of 2026 it was owned by the third generation of the Woodmansterne family. It ended use of plastic packaging in 2018 and received B Corporation certification in 2026. It operates printing presses in Watford and Milton Keynes.
