= Worksop Factory =

- Premier Foods Worksop
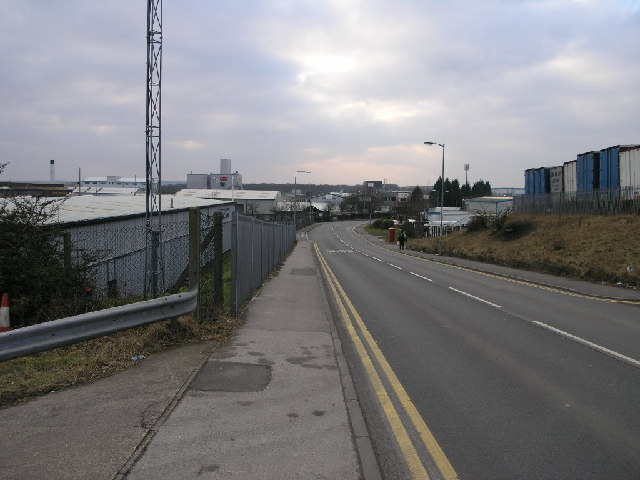
- The Oxo factory seen in February 2006

- Location within Nottinghamshire

General information
- Type: Food production plant
- Location: Dukeries Industrial Estate, Worksop, S81 7AY
- Coordinates: 53.318°N 1.14°W
- Elevation: 43 m (141 ft)
- Construction started: 1980
- Completed: 1982
- Inaugurated: 17 November 1982
- Client: Unilever
- Owner: Premier Foods

The Worksop Factory is a main food manufacturing site in Bassetlaw District in north Nottinghamshire that makes well-known types of instant food, such as instant noodles, as well as well-known gravy products.

== History ==
Unilever a site at East Bridgford.

In July 1969, £750,000 was invested in a new plant for packet soups, to open in 1971. In 1969, the extension to the factory was begun by local MP Joe Ashton; it would employ 300 more people.

A new factory was to be built in early 1975. The site was fined in September 1977.

Packet soups moved to Kent in the early 1990s.

A distribution centre was built in 1999, with another in Peterborough, which opened on 3 December 1999.

=== Industrial action ===
In September 1977, a nine-week strike by the TGWU cost the company £5.5m.

== Production ==
In the mid-1980s, £2m was invested at the site. Cardboard for the tubs is provided by Sonoco Europe, in Chesterfield; the former Robinson Paperboard Packaging was bought in July 2011.

Every day the site makes 3.7m Oxo cubes. Around 50 million Bisto gravy drums are made each year.

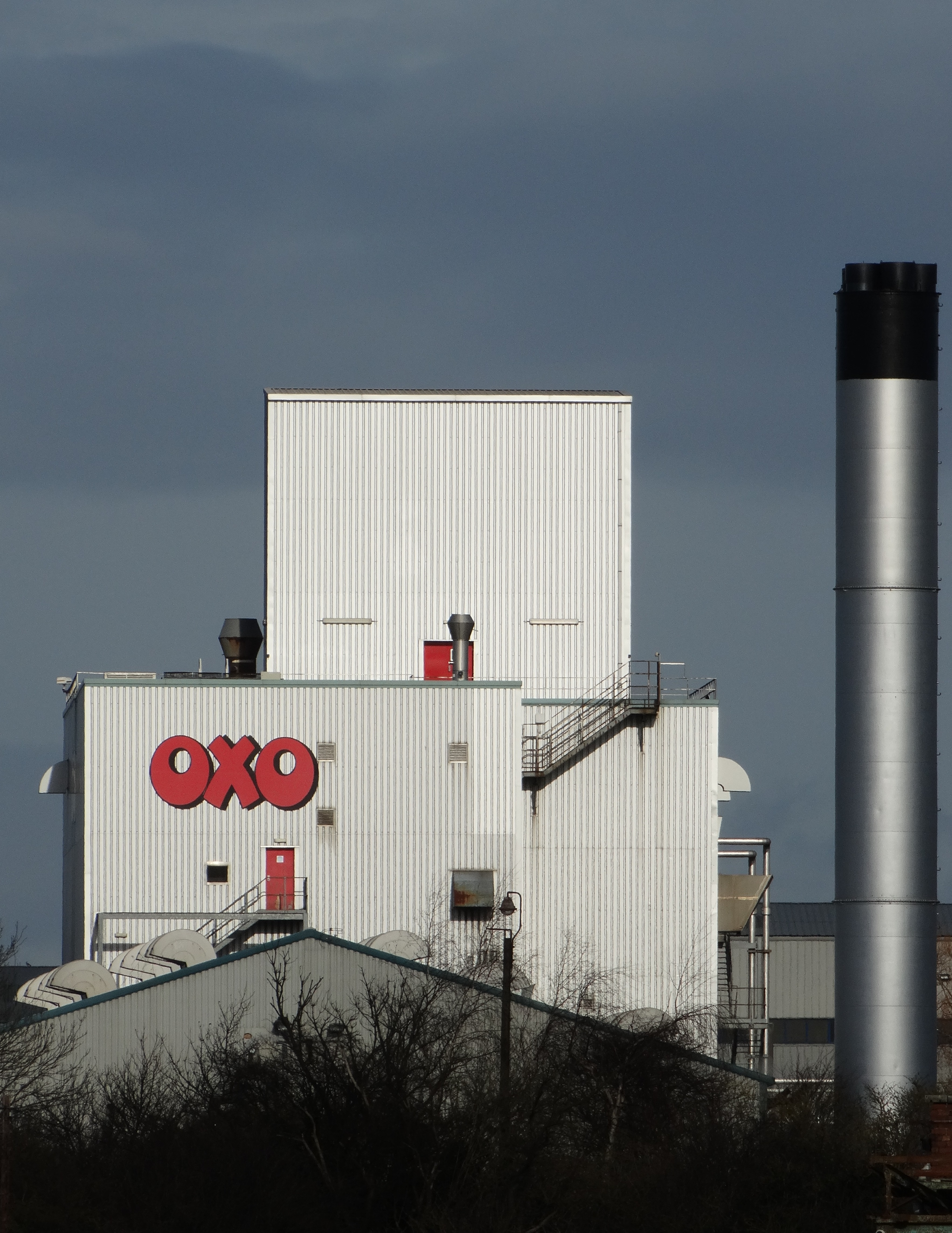
Seen from the A60 in February 2016

=== Oxo ===
Oxo was made at Great Harwood from 1939 to December 1992, when production was moved to Worksop by Unilever. Around four hundred employees had been at the Great Harwood site in Lancashire, but Unilever had tried to build a new factory in the 1980s, which was blocked by the local council.

After blocking a new factory in the 1980s, when Unilever announced to the local council, in 1990, it was leaving, the council attempted to stop Unilever leaving. Discussions were held in London with the local Conservative MP, Ken Hargreaves. In February 1991, it was announced that Oxo would move to Worksop, as part of Brooke Bond. Manufacturing equipment would move later in 1991. Manufacturing moved in December 1992.

Oxo became part of Van den Bergh Foods in 1995 at Crawley.

=== Gravy and salt ===
Saxa salt and Bisto were made at Middlewich in Cheshire until September 2008, which was the former Cerebos until 1968.

Bisto and Paxo, moved from Greatham to Middlewich in 1968, and moved to Worksop in 2008, previously being made by RHM Foods. Middlewich had also made Paxo stuffing, now made in Kent. Prince Philip visited this Bisto factory on 25 June 1969. RHM had bought Cerebos for £61m in July 1968. Cerebos also owned Sharwoods sauces, which mostly made mango chutney; Cerebos had bought J.A. Sharwood in November 1962. Sharwoods was made from 1968 by RHM in Greatham in Teesside; this site was the former Greatham Salt and Brine Works, and was the headquarters of Cerebos; the site also made Atora suet, now made in Wales (Dafen, Carmarthenshire). RHM, itself, was formed in 1963. RHM exported over six hundred different products to seventy five countries.

=== Food sauces ===
In 1995 Ragú sauce and Chicken Tonight started to be made at the site, the first in the UK; there were many TV advertisements.

The process line was built by T Musk Engineering of Swadlincote, part of WT Parker.

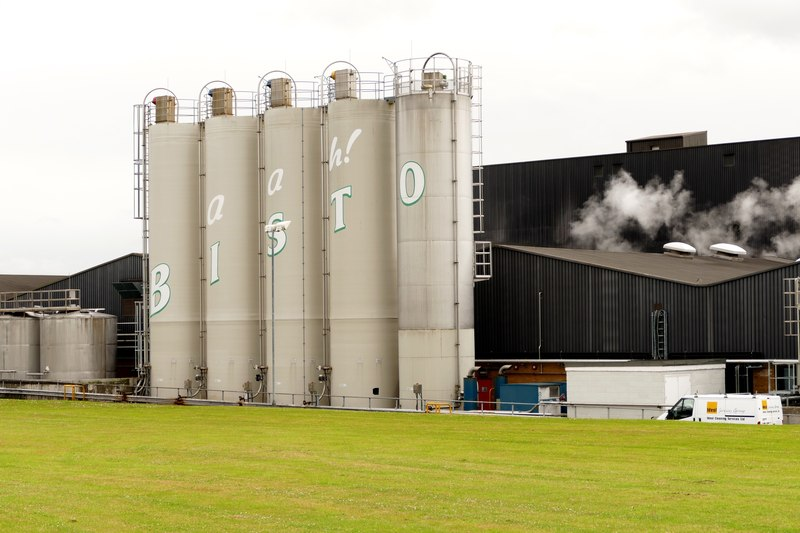
Bisto site in May 2015

=== Mushy peas ===
Main variety of mushy peas were Marrowfat peas and Alaskan Blue. Peas were sorted at Worksop, in the 1960s, then processed elsewhere.

Another pea plant was on George Street in Huntingdon, with 325 staff; it closed in 1966.

== Research ==
It has the company research department for dried foods.

The site had most collaboration, in research, with the Colworth research division, which was bought by Unilever in 1947.

In the 1960s the Unilever Food Development Unit on Greyhope Road was at the Torry Food Science Laboratory, near Aberdeen, where it developed accelerated freeze drying, which the British government had required Unilever to investigate, during the Cold War. The site closed in July 1965.

== Visits ==
- The site was featured on BBC Two on Tuesday 14 August 2018.
- In 2005 mathematician Marcus du Sautoy visited the factory, in the first part of his BBC Radio 4 series Five Shapes, where he discussed the cube, with Alan Mansbridge, head of production, and where he watched cubes being made on the production line; 40 million were made each week.

== See also ==
- List of instant noodle brands
