= Bisto =

Brand of food products

- Product type: Gravy; cooking sauces and seasoning
- Current owner: Premier Foods
- Country: United Kingdom
- Introduced: 1908
- Markets: UK; Ireland
- Previous owners: RHM
- Tagline: "Aah, Bisto"
- Website: bisto.co.uk

Bisto is a popular and well-known brand of gravy and other food products in the United Kingdom and Ireland owned by Premier Foods.

== History ==
Invented by Messrs McRoberts and Patterson in 1908, the first Bisto product was a meat-flavoured gravy powder which rapidly became a bestseller in the UK. Added to gravies it thickened them giving a richer taste and aroma.

Bisto Granules, which dissolve in hot water to form a gravy substitute, were introduced in 1979. As of 2005, Bisto Gravy Granules had a British market share of over 70%. Nearly all British grocery outlets stock a Bisto product.

== Products ==
As of 2025, in addition to the original gravy powder the company produces these products.

=== Gravy granules range ===
- Beef
- Beef (reduced salt)
- Beef (gluten-free)
- Chicken
- Chicken (reduced salt)
- Chicken (gluten-free)
- Chicken with garden herbs (2025 limited edition)
- Turkey
- Vegetable
- Onion
- Southern style
- American hot & spicy
- Swedish Style Meatball
- Pigs In Blankets (bacon flavour; 2022 limited edition)
- Sausage (2024 limited edition)
- Winter Spice also (2024 limited edition)
- Peri Peri (2025 limited edition)

=== Bisto Best range ===
In 1991, Bisto launched a new, more expensive granules product. Packaged in a glass jar, it offers a fuller flavour than standard granules. Many of the flavors (not all) on offer are incidentally gluten and dairy free.

- Beef
- Beef (reduced salt)
- Chicken
- Chicken (reduced salt)
- Turkey
- Pork
- Lamb
- Vegetable
- Caramelised Onion

=== Gravy pots range ===
A range of ready to use microwavable pots:

- Chip Shop gravy
- Chip Shop curry sauce
- Spicy pepper Sauce
- Katsu curry Sauce

=== Signature range ===
Introduced in 2025, this ready-to-use gravy is similar to the Ready To Pour range of the late 1990s and early 2000s, and it comes in cartons.

- Rich beef
- Chicken
- Duck
- Lamb
- Pork
- Turkey Christmas edition

=== Sauce mixes range ===
- Cheese sauce
- Parsley sauce
- White sauce
- Curry sauce
- Pepper sauce

=== Frozen foods ===
Produced under licence by Kerry Foods except where stated

- Yorkshire puddings (manufactured by Greencore)
- Cottage pie
- Bangers and mash
- Roast chicken dinner
- Roast beef dinner
- Shepherd's pie
- Beef in gravy
- Spaghetti bolognese
- Meat free spaghetti bolognese
- Roast lamb dinner
- Chips in curry sauce
- Chilli con carne
- Lasagne

== Advertising ==
Bisto is notable both for the age of its brand and for the advertising campaigns it has used. In 1919, the Bisto Kids (created by illustrator Will Owen (1869–1957)) appeared in newspapers and soon became popular. The Bisto Kids were a boy and girl in ragged clothes, who were illustrated catching the aroma of Bisto on the breeze exhaling longingly, "Ah, Bisto!"

A Bisto advertisement

The Bisto Kids were part of more elaborate advertising campaigns in later years. The Bisto Kids have not been featured in Bisto advertising since 1996. Many Bisto adverts shown on television through the years on British and Irish television are available on websites including YouTube, Dailymotion, Classic TV Adverts, Retro TV Adverts, History of Advertising Trust, Vimeo, and TV Ark.

=== 1930s ===
In Birmingham in the 1930s a competition was held to choose a name for the two Bisto twin characters, a boy and a girl who smell Bisto's gravy. The competition was won by Mr and Mrs Simmonds, who named the twins after themselves, calling them Bill and Maree.

=== 1950s ===
During the 1950s "Bisto For All Meat Dishes" was one of their first television advertisements.

=== 1960s ===
Adverts during the 1960s included "Pass The Gravy Pass The Bisto" and "Does Cooking Proud". At the end of the decade television adverts changed from monochrome to colour. Bobby Moore featured in the first colour advert for Bisto gravy in 1969.

=== 1970s ===
Advert phrases during the 1970s included "Where there's meat there's Bisto" and "Browns, seasons and thickens all in one" in a series of family adverts shown on television with celebrities including Gordon Banks, Anita Harris, Henry Cooper, Jon Pertwee, Billy Bremner, Dick Emery, Terry Wogan, and Alan Ball.

=== 1980s ===
In 1984, RHM Foods launched a nationwide competition to find children to act the role of the Bisto Kids, the recurrent "The Bisto Kids of the Year Awards". The first ever competition was won by Hayley Griffiths and Jimmy Endicott from Doncaster. They were six years old at the time and became the faces of Bisto, both for public relations and marketing events and also appeared in an advert shown on prime time TV to find the next Bisto Kids.

Bisto sponsored the ITV Telethon in 1988.

=== 1990s ===
Adverts for Bisto gravy during the 1990s included the Dean Martin song "Memories Are Made of This". Other phrases were "Real Gravy in No Time at All", Vanessa Williams in a series of adverts called Save the Best for Last for Bisto Best range (1993–1996), a Puts the Ahh into a Meal" series (1990–1992), and a series with Julie Walters (1996–1998).

=== 2000–present ===
The company sponsors the Bisto Book of the Year Awards in the Republic of Ireland. The latest campaign for Bisto encourages families to sit up at the table for one night a week to eat 'proper' food.

In 2025, Bisto entered into a brand partnership with Aardman Animations cartoon characters Wallace & Gromit. Characters from the films featured on Bisto products, with consumers offered the chance to win a lab-grown blue diamond worth £1,500. A pop-up gravy restaurant called "The Gravy Boat" opened in Paddington, London with a gravy-themed three course menu and "meet and greet" opportunities for diners to meet Wallace, Gromit, and Feathers McGraw.

In Autumn 2026 some new television advertising campaigns including a Halloween 1, Christmas 1 and an Easter 1 in Spring 2027. Some, but not all older adverts may have a rerun in some people's television screens too.

== Ownership ==
Bisto has had several owners since its creation. It is owned by Premier Foods, which acquired Bisto when it bought Rank Hovis McDougall in March 2007 forming the largest UK foods manufacturing company.

== Competition ==
Bisto's main competitor is Goldenfry Foods Ltd. which makes a branded gravy as well as most supermarket own-brand gravies.
