= Charles Gilson =

British officer and writer

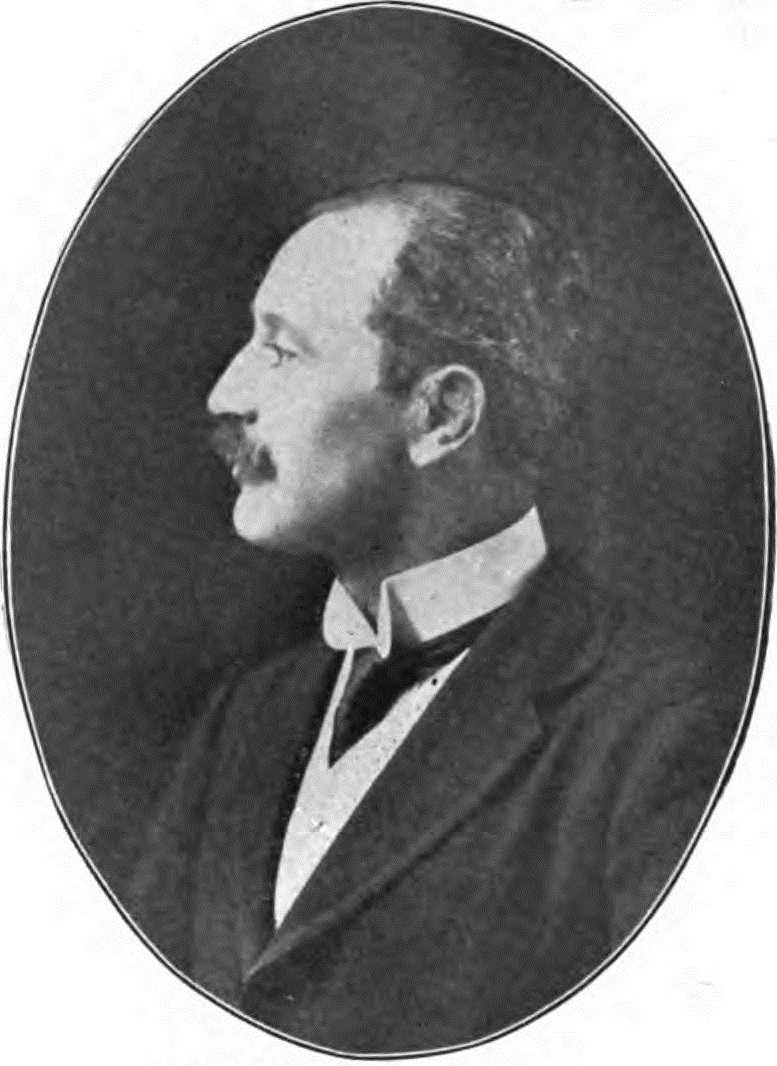
Charles Gilson c. 1910

Charles James Louis Gilson (8 July 1878 – 18 May 1943), who published as Captain Charles Gilson, Major Charles Gilson and Barbara Gilson, was a British officer and a popular author of science fiction, adventure stories, and historical fiction books for children.

Gilson was born in the village of Dedham in Essex. He served with his regiment the Sherwood Foresters during the Boer War, for which he penned a history of the 1st Battalion in that conflict, and then in China after the Boxer Rebellion. China features as the backdrop for some of his stories and one of them features a Chinese detective. He wrote young adult fiction and was praised for his "wide knowledge of the world" in his portrayals. His stories were also published in magazines for youth such as The Captain and St. Nicholas Magazine. Another of his works featured the exploits of Jerry Abershaw. He also produced an account of Robin Hood.

His fiction included works about the Pygmies of the Upper Congo. He also depicted Boxer Rebellion era adventures. Some of his stories were serialized in magazines. The Spectator reviewed his book The Lost Column in 1908. Many of his stories are available online through resources such as Project Gutenberg.

Some of his stories were illustrated including at least one book, The Refugee; the Strange Story of Nether Hall, by Arthur E. Becher. Cyrus Cuneo also illustrated his writing.

He died in Kensington, London in 1943.

== Bibliography ==
- History of the 1st Battalion Sherwood Foresters in the Boer War 1899-1902 (1908) introduction by Horace Smith-Dorrien
- The Lost Island: A Strange Tale of Adventure in the Far East (1910)
- The Refugee: the Strange Story of Nether Hall (1910) with illustrations by Arthur E. Becher
- The Spy: A Tale of the Peninsular War and the Storming of Badajoz etc. (1911)
- The Sword of Deliverance: A Story of the Balkan War, the Battle of Lule Burgas and the Siege of Adrianople (1913)
- The Pirate Aeroplane (1913)
- Certain Passages in the Life of Mr Wang (1914)
- Across the Cameroons: A Story of War and Adventure (1916)
- Submarine U93: A Tale of the Great War etc. (1916) illustrated by George Soper
- The Pirate Yacht, an Amazing Yarn of Modern Pirates (1918)
- The Fire-Gods: A Tale of the Congo (1920)
- The Lost City: Being the Authentic Account of Professor Miles Unthank of the Search for the Sarcophagus of Serophis, and the Theft of the Mystic Scarab, Formerly in the British Museum (1920)
- Held by Chinese Brigands (1920)
- Jugatai, the Tartar (1920)
- The Boy's Own Annual Vol. 43 (1921) with L. R. Brightwell; illustrated by C. Gifford Ambler, George Soper et al.
- Treasure of Kings (1922)
- The Realm of the Wizard King: A Romance of Central Africa (1922)
- The Lost City (1923)
- The Boy's Own Paper (1923)
- The Lost Column; A Story of the Boxer Rebellion in China (1924)
- The Silver Shoe: Being an Account of a Secret Society and the Doings of Chung-li and Certain Other Chinese etc. (1924)
- The Treasure Of The Red Tribe (1926) published by Cassell & Co
- Mystery Island (1928) published by S.W. Partridge
- The City of the Sorcerer (1934)
- The Cat and the Curate: A Phenomenal Experience (1934)
- Raja Dick (1934) published by Oxford University Press
- Queen of the Andes (1935) as Barbara Gilson
- Wolfskin (1936)
- Congo Chains (1937)
- Robin of Sherwood (1940)
- The Secret Agent (1946)
