= Sign-on and sign-off =

Beginning and ending of operations for broadcast station

The closing announcement of ARD as heard in 1993 (in German)

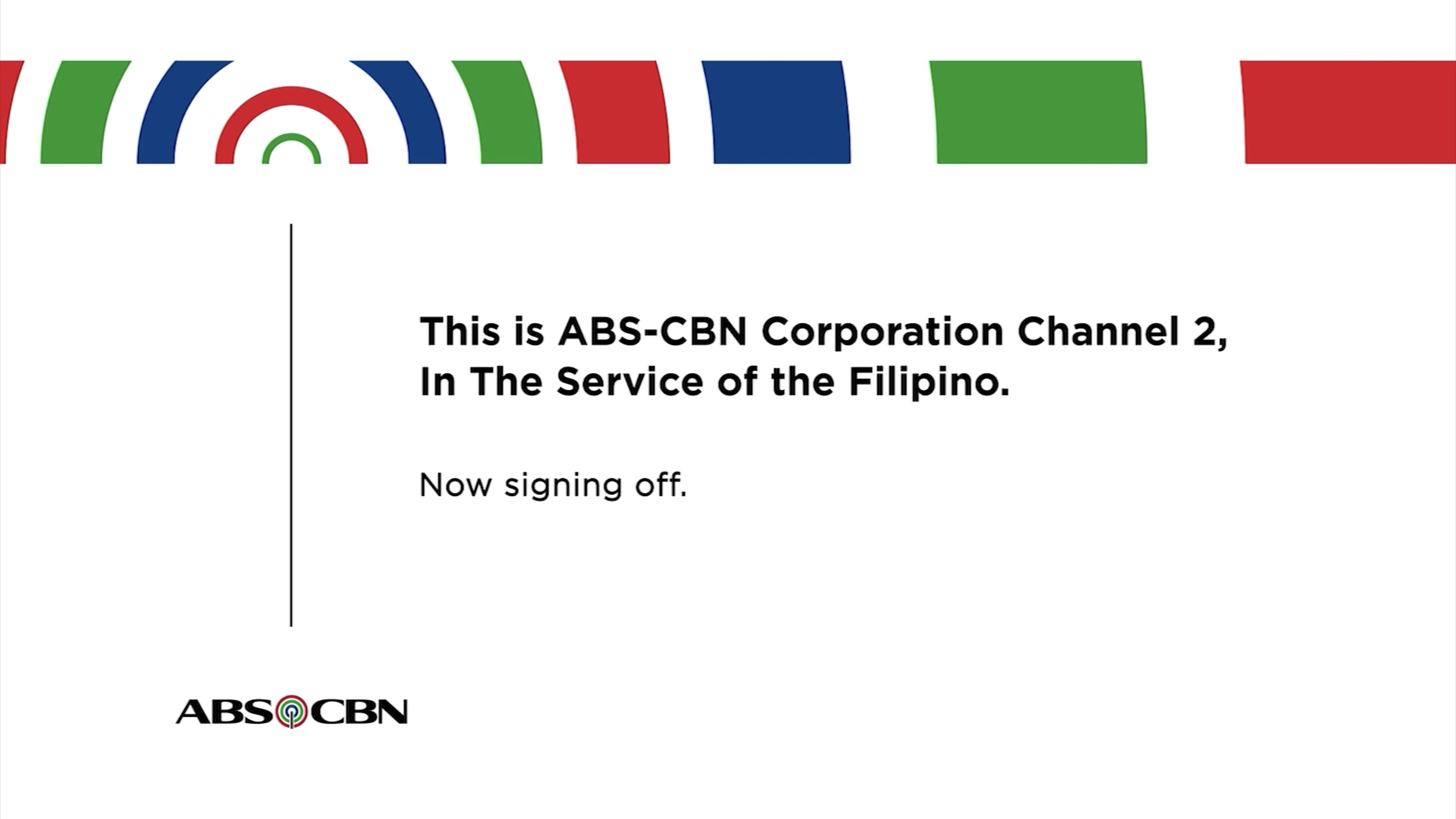
The sign-off message broadcast by DWWX-TV (ABS-CBN Manila) and DWAC-TV (ABS-CBN Sports and Action) before stopping all broadcasts at 7:52 pm (PST) in compliance with the NTC order because of the expiration of its franchise on 5 May 2020

A sign-on (or start-up in Commonwealth countries except Canada and Australia) is the beginning of operations for a radio or television station, generally at the start of each day. It is the opposite of a sign-off (or closedown in Commonwealth countries except Canada and Australia), which is the sequence of operations involved when a radio or television station shuts down its transmitters and goes off the air for a predetermined period; generally, this occurs during the overnight hours although a broadcaster's digital specialty or sub-channels may sign-on and sign-off at significantly different times than its main channels.

Like other television programming, sign-on and sign-off sequences can be initiated by a broadcast automation system, and automatic transmission systems can turn the carrier signal and transmitter on/off by remote control. (Note: Conversely, broadcast automation has greatly reduced the number of sign-offs, as the local operator can hand off control to a commonly-owned regional station and leave their automated systems to run graveyard slot infomercials or pass unedited network feeds through with little more than a pause for automated station identification. A few may even use "we're always on" as a selling point, although it is becoming the rule rather than the exception.)

Sign-on and sign-off sequences have become less common due to the increasing prevalence of 24/7 broadcasting. However, some national broadcasters continue the practice; particularly those in countries with limited broadcast coverage. Stations may also sometimes close for transmitter maintenance, or to allow another station to broadcast on the same channel space. (Note: Examples of this include the United Kingdom's BBC Four/CBeebies, Hungary's M2/M2 Petőfi, and the Czech Republic's ČT art/ČT Déčko.)

== Sign-on/start-up ==
Sign-ons, like sign-offs, vary from country to country, from station to station, and from time to time; however, most follow a similar general pattern. It is common for sign-ons to be followed by a network's early morning newscast, or their morning or breakfast show.

Some broadcasters that have ceased signing on and signing off in favour of 24-hour broadcasting may perform a sign-on sequence at a certain time in the morning (usually between 4 and 7 a.m.) as a formality to signify the start of its operating day (in the United States, the broadcast logging day begins at 6 a.m. local time). These may be the switchover from network-provided overnight programming to the early morning newscast, which is the first live program of the day.

=== Sign-on/start-up sequence ===
The sign-on sequence may include some or all of the following stages, but not necessarily in this order:

- For television or radio stations that cut off their signal during off-broadcast hours, a test pattern or a static image accompanied by a 400 Hz tone, a 1 kHz tone (or other single-sine-wave tones) or music may be broadcast fifteen to twenty minutes before the actual sign-on. Digital channels may still run overnight programs or interstitials at this time (ITV Nightscreen in the United Kingdom being an example), which conclude when the station's main programming schedule begins.
- A signal to turn on remote transmitters may be played—this is usually a series of touch tones.
- On radio stations, especially international stations on shortwave, an interval signal may be played in a loop, usually for 3 to 5 minutes before the actual broadcast starts.
- Technical information is provided. This can include station identification (call sign and city of license), transmitter power, frequency or channel number, translators used, transmitter locations, list of broadcast engineers, and/or studio/transmitter links (STL).
- A television station may show a video and photo montage set to the national anthem or other patriotic piece of music. The accompanying television video may include images of the national flag, the head of state, national heroes, national military soldiers, national symbols, and other nationalistic imagery (especially on state-owned broadcasters), or simply the station ident. In the case of television stations broadcasting to audiences in more than one country, the flags and national symbols of each country in turn may be shown, with its respective national anthem being played.
- Ownership information about the station, and a list of related organizations.
- A video of people singing an opening song, or opening dance performance to start the day.
- A greeting to viewers or listeners.
- Contact information, such as street and mailing addresses, telephone number, email, and website details.
- A prayer or other religious acknowledgement, particularly in countries with a state religion, in theocracies, and on religious broadcasters.
- A schedule for the upcoming programs, or the day's programs.
- A disclaimer that station programming is taped, aired live, or originates from a television or radio network.
- Another disclaimer that programs are for personal use only (sometimes with information on copyright restrictions), and a statement that businesses cannot profit from showing them by applying a cover charge for viewing.
- A statement of commitment to quality; this may be in the form of a recognized standard, such as the Philippines' Broadcast Code of the Kapisanan ng mga Brodkaster ng Pilipinas (Association of Broadcasters of the Philippines).
- A station identification, including some or all of the television channel, AM or FM frequency, call sign, branding, and a clock ident.
- Generally a station jingle or slogan will be played, accompanied on television with video clips featuring station programming or personalities. The Start-Up/Sign-On Notice is announced after the national anthem.

While most of these sign-on steps are done as a service to the public, or for advertising reasons, some of them may be required by the government of the country.

== Sign-off/closedown ==
Sign-offs, like sign-ons, vary from country to country, from station to station, and from time to time; however, most follow a similar general pattern. Many stations follow the reverse process to their sign-on sequence at the start of the day.

Many stations, while no longer conducting a sign-off and being off air for a period of time each day, instead run low-cost programming during those times of low viewer numbers. This may include infomercials, movies, television show reruns, simple weather forecasts, low cost news or infotainment programming from other suppliers, simulcasts of sister services, or feeds of local cable TV companies' programming via a fiber optic line to the cable headend. Other broadcasters that are part of a radio or television network may run an unedited feed of the network's overnight programming from a central location, without local advertising. During what are otherwise closedown hours, some channels may also simulcast their teletext pages or full page headlines with music or feeds from sister radio stations playing in the background. Some stations, after doing a sign-off, nonetheless continue to transmit throughout the off-air period on cable/satellite; this transmission may involve a test pattern, static image, local weather radar display, teletext pages or full-page headlines which was accompanied by music or a local weather radio service.

Some broadcasters that have ceased signing on and signing off in favour of 24-hour broadcasting may perform a sign-off sequence at a certain time in the night (usually between 10 p.m. and 1 a.m.) as a formality to signify the end of its operating day (in the United States, the broadcast logging day ends at 4 a.m. local time).

=== Sign-off/closedown sequence ===
Indian-head test pattern used in North America

The sign-off sequence may include some or all of the following stages, but not necessarily in this order:

- An announcement informing viewers that the station is about to go off-air: it may also include a message of thanks for the viewer's patronage, along with an announcement of the time when the station is scheduled to sign on again.
- A station jingle or slogan may be played, accompanied on television with video clips featuring station programming or personalities, or perhaps stock scenes from the station's main city/cities. A series of program trailers may also be played.
- A prayer, hymn, or other religious acknowledgement, particularly in countries with a state religion or theocracies, and on religious broadcasters. Other channels may opt for a pre-taped sermonette or something similar. See section below.
- A short newscast and weather forecast. Stations also show PSAs through Ad Council or any organizations, for instance; some channels in the United Kingdom also included a public information film. Meanwhile, in the United States, it is common for a brief news reel to be broadcast over the station's logo, often accompanied by public service and missing and most wanted persons announcements.
- A clock ident, which can be silent, play music or feature an announcer.
- A program guide for the following day's programs.
- Closing credits acknowledging announcers, technicians and other crew who operated the day's broadcast.
- Ownership information about the station and their parent company, as well as their contact information, such as street and mailing addresses, telephone or fax number, zip code, e-mail, and website details.
- A video of people singing a closing song, or closing dance performance to end the day's broadcast.
- A disclaimer that programs are for personal use only (sometimes with information on copyright restrictions), and a statement that businesses cannot profit from showing them by applying a cover charge for viewing.
- A disclaimer that station programming may be taped, aired live, or originates from another television or radio network.
- Technical information provided, such as the call sign, transmitter power, translators used, transmitter locations, a list of broadcast engineers (in the Philippines only), and studio/transmitter links (STL).
- The viewer may be encouraged to view or listen to alternative services during the station's downtime; these are usually sister or affiliate stations.
- A statement of commitment to quality, usually in the form of a recognized standard: in the Philippines, it is usually the Broadcast Code of the Kapisanan ng mga Brodkaster ng Pilipinas (Association of Broadcasters of the Philippines), while in the United States, it was (until 1983) the Television Code of the National Association of Broadcasters. Same as the start-up, the closedown/sign-off notice is shown before the National Anthem.
- A television station may show a video and photo montage set to the national anthem or other patriotic piece of music. The accompanying television video may include images of the national flag, the head of state, national heroes, national military soldiers, national symbols, and other nationalistic imagery (especially on state-owned broadcasters, but sometimes on privately owned ones too), or simply the station ident. In the case of television stations broadcasting to audiences in more than one country, the flags and national symbols of each country in turn may be shown, with its respective national anthem being played.
- Stations in the German-speaking parts of Europe (DACH) would use a slide with the station logo and the word Sendeschluss (in Germany and Austria also alternatively spelt Sendeschluß with an eszett), meaning "shutdown", shown prior to the test card (as opposed to before the signal being cut) to tell the viewer to switch off their sets. This practice ceased around 1994–96.
- The station may display some type of novelty item, such as an animated character, particular to that station or its locale.
- Viewers may be reminded to turn off their television sets just prior to the transmitter being switched off. This was historically practised in the United Kingdom, German-speaking Europe and many parts of the Eastern Bloc, and is still in regular practice in places like Russia and some areas of Japan. Sometimes, a loud tone may be played on the audio to encourage sleeping viewers to turn their television sets off, in order to prevent electricity wastage and mitigate the risk of fires and/or explosions occurring in older TV sets.
- On channels intended for young children, a short video may be shown of the channel's characters or hosts going to bed, before showing a loop of them sleeping throughout the night until programming resumes the following morning.
- Finally, stations may show a test card, station logo, a loop of the station ident, a black screen, or a static schedule (telling viewers of the programming line-up once broadcasting resumes), usually with a monotone sound or a relay of a radio station: some stations may show a sequence of teletext pages, while others may use a promotional video or a series of infomercials. Other stations may simply cut off the signal, usually by sending a series of touch tones to turn off remote transmitters, which resulted in static on an analog television signal. Others may switch to a 24-hour channel or show archived programming. (Note: Standard practice tends to vary between countries. Canadian stations tend to leave a test card up after sign-off. US stations most often drop carrier signals entirely after sign-off to conserve energy. Finnish stations and some Japanese stations would leave a grey screen for approximately 1 minute after sign-off before cutting signal entirely.)

Some countries have a legal protocol for signing-off: in the United States, the minimum requirement is the station's call sign, followed by its designated city of license. Many stations do include other protocols, such as the national anthem or transmitter information, as a custom or service to the public.

In the United Kingdom, before the introduction of 24-hour television, there was no known legal protocol for a sign-off: BBC One and many ITV regions customarily included a continuity announcement, clock and the country's national anthem (for BBC One Wales and HTV Wales, Hen Wlad Fy Nhadau was also played beforehand), while Granada and Channel 4 signed-off with just an announcement, clock and ident, and BBC Two, Yorkshire and Border closed down with an announcement over their station clock.

In Germany, it is a custom to play the national anthem (for Bayerischer Rundfunk and stations owned by ProSiebenSat.1 Media, the Bayernhymne was also played beforehand) and the European Union anthem. ARD started playing the national anthem at closedown on 23 May 1985.

In Spain, it is a custom to play the national anthem (for RTVA, EITB and Televisión de Galicia, the respective anthems of their autonomous communities would also be played beforehand).

In all Commonwealth realms outside the United Kingdom, it was a custom to play each realm's national anthem, examples being those of Australia and Canada (for some stations, God Save the King/Queen would also be played beforehand, except on CFRN-TV in Edmonton pre-2000 and CTV's Saskatchewan stations [before 24 hour programming], where it was played on its own.)

== Religious acknowledgements during sign-on and sign-off ==
Country	Religious acknowledgement
Afghanistan	Quran reading
Algeria	Quran reading
Armenia	Christian blessing
Antigua and Barbuda	Christian hymn
Australia	Christian hymn
Austria	Bible reading, responsorial psalm or Christian prayer
Bahrain	Quran reading
Bangladesh	Quran, Bhagvad Gita, Tripitaka or Bible reading
Barbados	Christian hymn
Bhutan	Buddhist hymn
Bolivia	Christian sermonette or prayer
Brazil	Christian programme
Brunei	Quran reading
Burkina Faso	Quran reading
Cambodia	Buddhist quote or inspirational message
Canada	Christian sermonette or prayer (English-language channels) or responsorial psalm (French-language channels)
Colombia	Christian prayer
Comoros	Quran reading
Djibouti	Quran reading
Egypt	Quran reading
Ethiopia	Bible reading or Christian prayer
France	Responsorial psalm
Germany	Bible reading, responsorial psalm or Christian prayer
Greece	Christian prayer or Bible reading
Grenada	Christian hymn
Indonesia	Quran or Bhagvad Gita reading
Iran	Quran reading
Iraq	Quran reading
(Republic of Ireland) Ireland	Christian prayer
Israel	Psuko Shel Yom
Jordan	Quran reading
Kenya	Bible reading
Kuwait	Quran reading
Libya	Quran reading
Malaysia	Quran reading
Maldives	Quran reading
Mali	Quran reading
Mauritania	Quran reading
Morocco	Quran reading
Myanmar	Buddhist quote
Nepal	Hindu song or inspirational message
Niger	Quran reading
Nigeria	Christian prayer and Quran reading
Oman	Quran reading
Pakistan	Quran reading
Palestine	Quran reading
Peru	Christian prayer
Philippines	Catholic prayer
Poland	Responsorial psalm and Alleluia (either both or only the psalm)
Portugal	Bible reading
Qatar	Quran reading
Saint Lucia	Christian hymn
Saint Vincent and the Grenadines	Christian prayer
Saudi Arabia	Quran reading
Senegal	Quran reading
Somalia	Quran reading
South Africa	Christian prayer and/or sermonette
Spain	Bible reading
Sri Lanka	Buddhist prayer or Hindu prayer
Sudan	Quran reading
Syria	Quran reading
Thailand	Buddhist quote or inspirational message
Trinidad and Tobago	Christian prayer
Uganda	Christian prayer
United Arab Emirates	Quran reading
United Kingdom	The Epilogue
United States	Christian, Jewish, Muslim, Buddhist, Hindu or other religious prayer, sermonette or inspirational message
Western Sahara	Quran reading
Yemen	Quran reading

== Special sign-on/off cases ==
=== Historical ===
In a number of countries, closedowns formerly took place during the daytime, as well as overnight. In the United Kingdom, this was initially due to government-imposed restrictions on daytime broadcasting hours, and later, due to budgetary constraints. The eventual relaxation of these rules meant that afternoon closedowns ceased permanently on the ITV network in October 1972, but the BBC maintained the practice until Friday 24 October 1986, before commencing a full daytime service the following Monday. Afternoon closedowns continued in South Korea until December 2005. Hong Kong's broadcasting networks (particularly the English-speaking channels) also practiced this until mid-2008. In these cases, the station's transmitters later did not actually shut down for the afternoon break; either a test card was played, or static schedule was posted, telling viewers of the programming line-up once broadcasting resumes.

In Indonesia, restrictions on broadcast hours were also implemented in July 2005 as part of an energy saving campaign. Three years later, they were implemented again due to the electricity crisis.

=== Medium-wave AM ===
Medium wave radio is a special case due to its unusual propagation characteristics; it can bounce hundreds of miles by reflecting from the upper atmosphere at night, but during the day these same layers absorb signal instead of reflecting. A few powerful regional clear-channel stations have an extensive secondary coverage area which is protected by having smaller local co-channel stations in distant communities sign off shortly before sunset. A frequency on which a broadcaster has to drastically reduce power or sign off entirely at sunset was traditionally the least desirable assignment, which would usually go to small or new-entrant stations when all of the more favourable slots were already allocated.

These AM daytimers are becoming less common as stations (and audiences) migrate to FM or to frequencies vacated by the closure of other stations, but a handful still exist in the US and Mexico.

=== Religious ===
==== India ====
During religious holidays or occasions, Doordarshan and Akashvani will broadcast a prayer of any religion through the day, a week or a month (e.g. During Ramadan, a reading from the Quran, a Muslim quote, or a call for Azan and Fajr prayer will be broadcast. During Lent, a Christian prayer, a hymn or a psalm will be broadcast).

==== Indonesia ====
Some networks that normally do not operate for 24 hours may go on-air earlier or operate for 24 hours during Ramadan to show Islamic or entertainment programming for suhur.

In Bali during Nyepi, all terrestrial television and radio stations go off the air.

==== Israel ====
During Yom Kippur, virtually all radio and television stations based in Israel go silent for 24 hours, as required by law. However, most international networks (e.g. CNN) continue to broadcast as usual.

==== Malaysia ====
During Ramadan, Malaysian public broadcaster RTM operated TV1 24 hours a day instead of signing off. In 2012, TV1 broadcast 24 hours a day during the London Olympics in 2012, due to the time difference. This would become permanent in August 2012, to coincide with their sister channel TV2 by showing reruns from the broadcaster's archive library and movies on early mornings before start-up.

==== Philippines ====
During the Holy Week in the Philippines that occurs anywhere between the last week of March to the third week of April (depending on the Roman Catholic liturgical calendar), terrestrial television and radio stations continue regular programming from Palm Sunday until Holy Wednesday. From the midnight of Holy Thursday until the early hours of Easter Sunday (before 4 AM PHT), it is customary for most commercial television and radio networks to either remain off-the-air or reduce their broadcast hours. Stations that opt to remain on-air provide special programming such as Lenten drama specials and news coverage of various services and rites interspersed with Christian and mellow music content. Member stations of the Catholic Media Network also prominently follow the latter pattern, broadcasting Paschal Triduum services and other similar programming. Prior to 2002, TV and radio newscasts are either suspended or continued with a limited skeletal production unit, but that restriction has henceforth been relaxed slowly as a result of previous major breaking news stories.

Campus radio stations' operations during this time are left to the discretion of their respective schools, colleges, or universities by either closing down on the afternoon and/or evening of Holy Wednesday or remaining off-air for the entire Holy Week.

On cable, satellite, and live TV streaming, with the exception of specialty channels that broadcast horse racing, cockfighting, and the like that remain dormant during this period, most international networks distributed in the Philippines or Philippine-exclusive cable channels either continue to broadcast their 24/7 regular programming service week-long or provide specially arranged schedules from Holy Thursday to Black Saturday.

Below is the illustration of broadcast schedules on most terrestrial radio and TV networks during this period. Dates marked green are days where regular programming continues while those marked red are statutory public holidays when most TV and radio stations are either off-air or offering special programming.

Day	2026	2027	2028	2029
Palm Sunday	29 March	21 March	9 April	25 March
Holy Monday	30 March	22 March	10 April	26 March
Holy Tuesday	31 March	23 March	11 April	27 March
Holy Wednesday	1 April	24 March	12 April	28 March
Maundy Thursday	2 April	25 March	13 April	29 March
Good Friday	3 April	26 March	14 April	30 March
Black Saturday	4 April	27 March	15 April	31 March

There were, however a few notable historical exceptions:

- 2002 - Matinee actor Rico Yan died on 29 March of that year during his vacation at Dos Palmas, Puerto Princesa, Palawan. As word of his death spread through SMS, most of the TV and radio networks were off-air as the date fell on Good Friday. ABS-CBN reportedly ran ticker tapes superimposed on the SMPTE color bars reporting the first details known about the popular actor's death until studios were ready to broadcast an impromptu, open-ended special report. The event served as a catalyst for major Philippine broadcast networks to henceforth retain skeletal personnel for their news departments on standby for eventuality of major breaking news.
- 2015 - Typhoon Maysak (Chedeng) approached Aurora. Due to the impending storm, radio and television stations that were supposed to sign-off during the Triduum before the typhoon's landfall in the Philippines, aired news updates and open-ended coverage.
- 2020 - During the initial month of the COVID-19 pandemic and the enhanced community quarantine in Luzon, government-controlled television and radio stations abandoned signing-off during the Paschal Triduum, while the daily #LagingHanda press briefings conducted by the Presidential Communications Operations Office augmented its broadcast operations. On commercial radio and television stations, news updates related to the pandemic were broadcast alongside special programming.

== See also ==
- Ceefax
- Dark (broadcasting)
- Digital television transition in the United States
- Goodnight Kiwi
- Indian-head test pattern
- ITV Nightscreen
- Short-term Analog Flash and Emergency Readiness Act
- Star Gazers
- Television closedown routines in the United Kingdom
- Test Card F
- TVARK
