= Loeki de Leeuw =

Dutch stop-motion TV animation

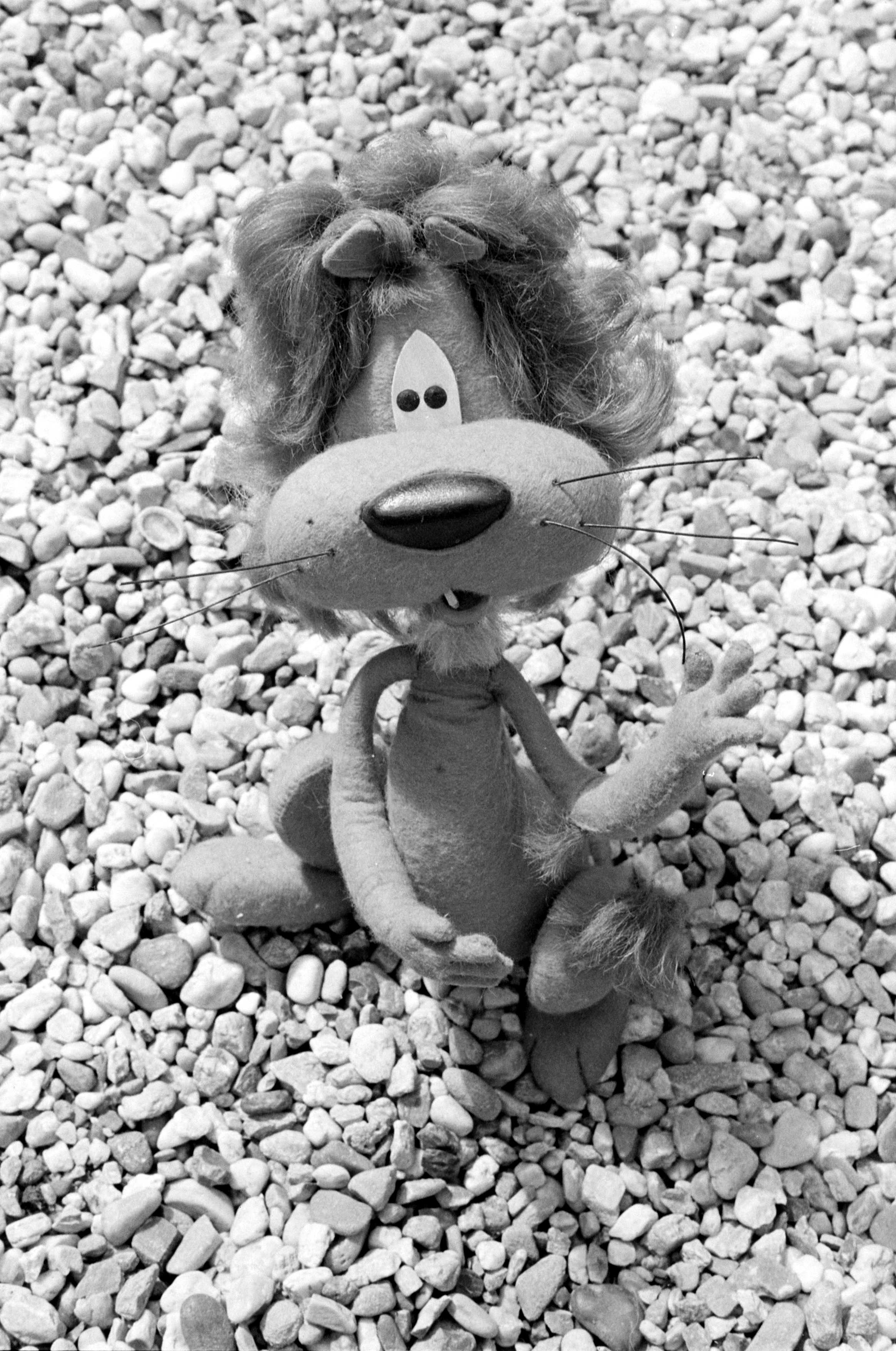
- Loeki de Leeuw (1978)
- First appearance: January 24, 1972 on Ster commercial break
- Created by: Joop Geesink

In-universe information
- Species: Lion
- Gender: Male
- Significant other: Roosje (girlfriend)
- Relatives: Welpie (nephew); Piep (friend); Guusje (friend); Filiep (friend)

Loeki de Leeuw (Loeki the Lion, also incorrectly spelled as Loekie de Leeuw) is a Dutch stop-motion TV animation, broadcast on Dutch public television between 1972 and 2004, with revivals in 2019 and again since 2021. It features a puppet lion in short sketches usually not longer than five seconds, which appeared as bumpers between commercial breaks. These animated shorts reached iconic status in the Netherlands, but were also broadcast in other countries including France, the United Kingdom, Austria, Italy, Japan and the United States.

== Concept ==
Loeki is a lion who usually encounters an absurd situation or does something clumsy in his films. Each short lasted only five seconds and was done almost entirely without dialogue, except for Loeki's catchphrase: "Asjemenou?" ("Well, I ever?" or more informally "What the heck?") which usually appeared as his closing statement to each film. When things turned out in his favor, he typically said: "Voilà!" ("There you go!"). Loeki was named after the famous Dutch football player Louis Biesbrouck (Loek). The series also has a group of side characters, but Loeki is the most well known.

== History ==
Loeki de Leeuw was originally created by animator Joop Geesink (1913–1984) in 1952 as a mascot for KLM in honor of the Netherlands national football team. In the early-1970s, new regulatory requirements for television advertising, originally introduced on Dutch public television in 1967, were drawn up so that the public could make a clear distinction between the series and the commercials, and the solution chosen was a short break bumper which would signal the beginning and end of the advertisement breaks, as well as bumpers that played between advertisements, which marked Loeki's move to television. These bumpers consisted of humorous animations of Loeki and his gang, and were such a success with the public that Loeki soon started appearing in between individual ads. Loeki made his first appearance on STER breaks on 24 January 1972. Up until that date, STER used a video of a wave effect between commercials. Studio Geesink, who made the animated shorts, estimate that over 7,000 individual films were made, several of which survive on homemade VHS recordings which have been uploaded to YouTube.

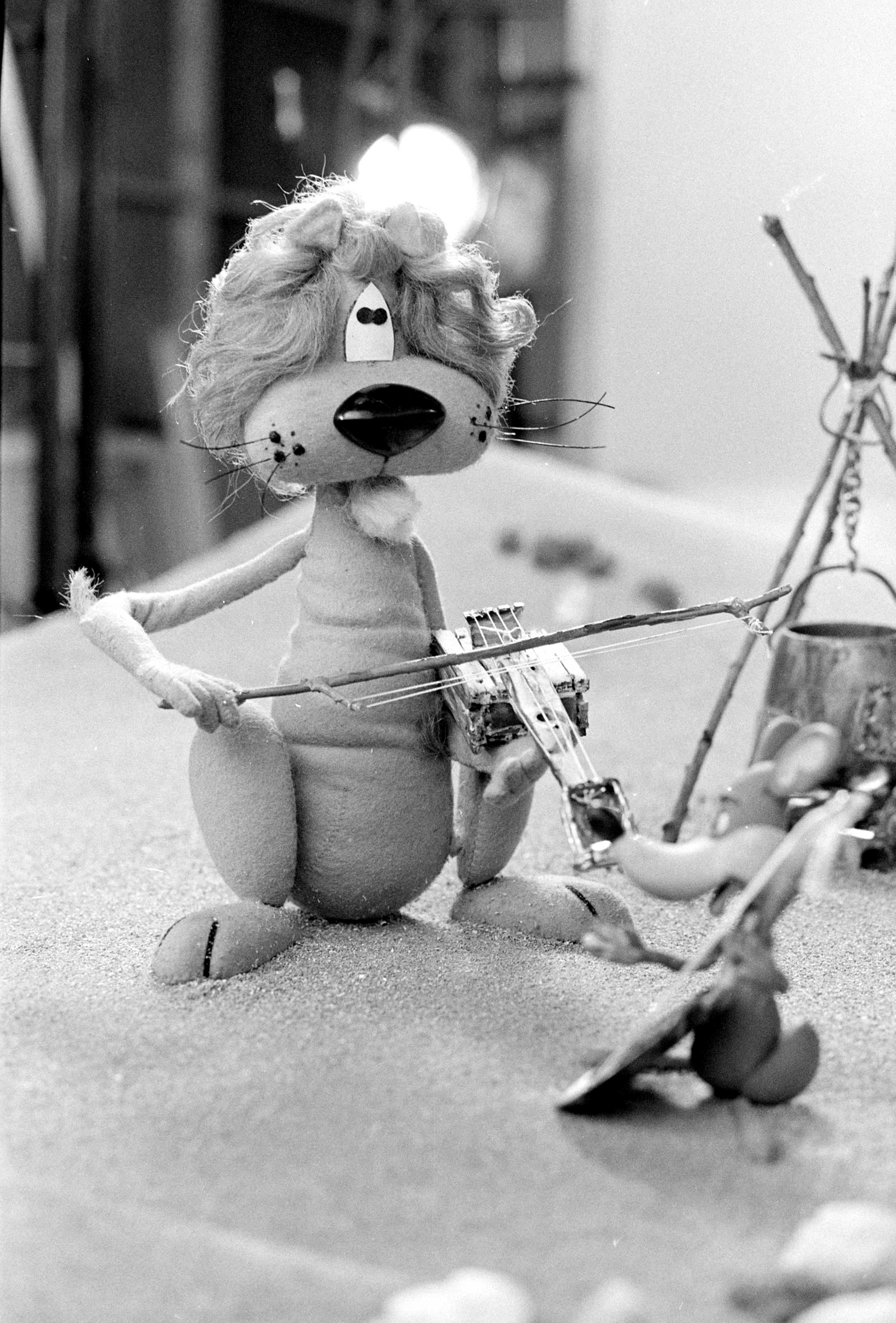
Loeki de Leeuw with Piep de Muis, one of his friends

Since Loeki de Leeuw was purely visual comedy, it had no trouble being sold to other countries too. Some of his shorts have been broadcast in France, Austria, Italy, Japan and the United States. In its later years, Westward Television of the United Kingdom would occasionally use a short clip of Loeki at closedown. Some of these have been uploaded to YouTube. Also the regional German TV channel Nord-3 & N3 aired Loeki de Leeuw clips between October 14, 1974 and December 2, 2001. Loeki de Leeuw was also aired by TF1 in France and in the USA on the five stations of the now-defunct Field Communications group of independent stations, of which Field had the US distribution rights for the shorts.Field Communications - Promotional Sales Tape (1980). YouTube.

Initially there were two prominent characters, Loeki himself and Piep the mouse. New characters were added beginning in the 1980s: lioness Roos, Goosje the duck, and Filiep, a blue elephant.

Bumpers used to start and end STER commercial breaks usually lasted ten seconds. Up until the mid 80s, the name of the channel (Nederland 1 or Nederland 2) was displayed. By 1989, there were already opening and closing bumpers without the STER logo, as well as no channel name insert. Often, the four-second Loeki shorts would be toggled with two-second abstract patterns. Following the appearance of commercial television (RTL 4), STER's bumpers were cut to just four seconds. The abstract animations were later removed by the early 90s, being replaced by black screens between commercials. When STER adopted a new logo in 2001, Loeki was removed from the opening and closing bumpers, but the short animations between commercials continued, owing to his popularity. The removal from the opening and closing bumpers was also due to the growing proliferation of commercial television channels.

STER retired Loeki in late 2004, citing increasingly unaffordable production costs; the time saved by axing Loeki's appearances would instead be sold to advertisers. The removal was mourned by viewers who grew up with the shorts.

Original puppets and props from Loeki's films have been exhibited since December 2006 in a large display at the Netherlands Institute for Sound and Vision in Hilversum. They consist of a number of series on themes (holidays, sports, transport, etc.). Puppets, props and films also formed part of the exhibition "100 years of advertising classics" in the Beurs van Berlage between 18 December 2010 and 6 March 2011.

Loeki made a one-off return to Dutch television on 30 January 2019, after a petition started by a radio show a week earlier reached more than ten thousand signatures within 24 hours. A Loeki short produced in late 2016, featuring the lion as a DJ, was shown shortly before 8pm that night on NPO 1; the film reached an audience of 1.4 million people. STER stated that they were seriously considering proposals to bring the character back on a permanent basis, although the following month STER decided against reintroducing Loeki during its advertising blocks, again citing high production costs.

On 1 March 2021, it was announced that Loeki would make a comeback in the summer during TV coverage of major sports-events, with a possible full-time return. Loeki returned on 9 May 2021, ahead of the Eurovision Song Contest in Rotterdam.

In June 2021, Ster announced that Loeki would remain on screen after the conclusion of that summer's major events, with new spots being made for longer-term use. The new films are made in part using computers. Loeki himself continues to be animated in stop-motion, a condition rights-holder Louise Geesink set as part of Loeki's return to television.

== Legacy ==
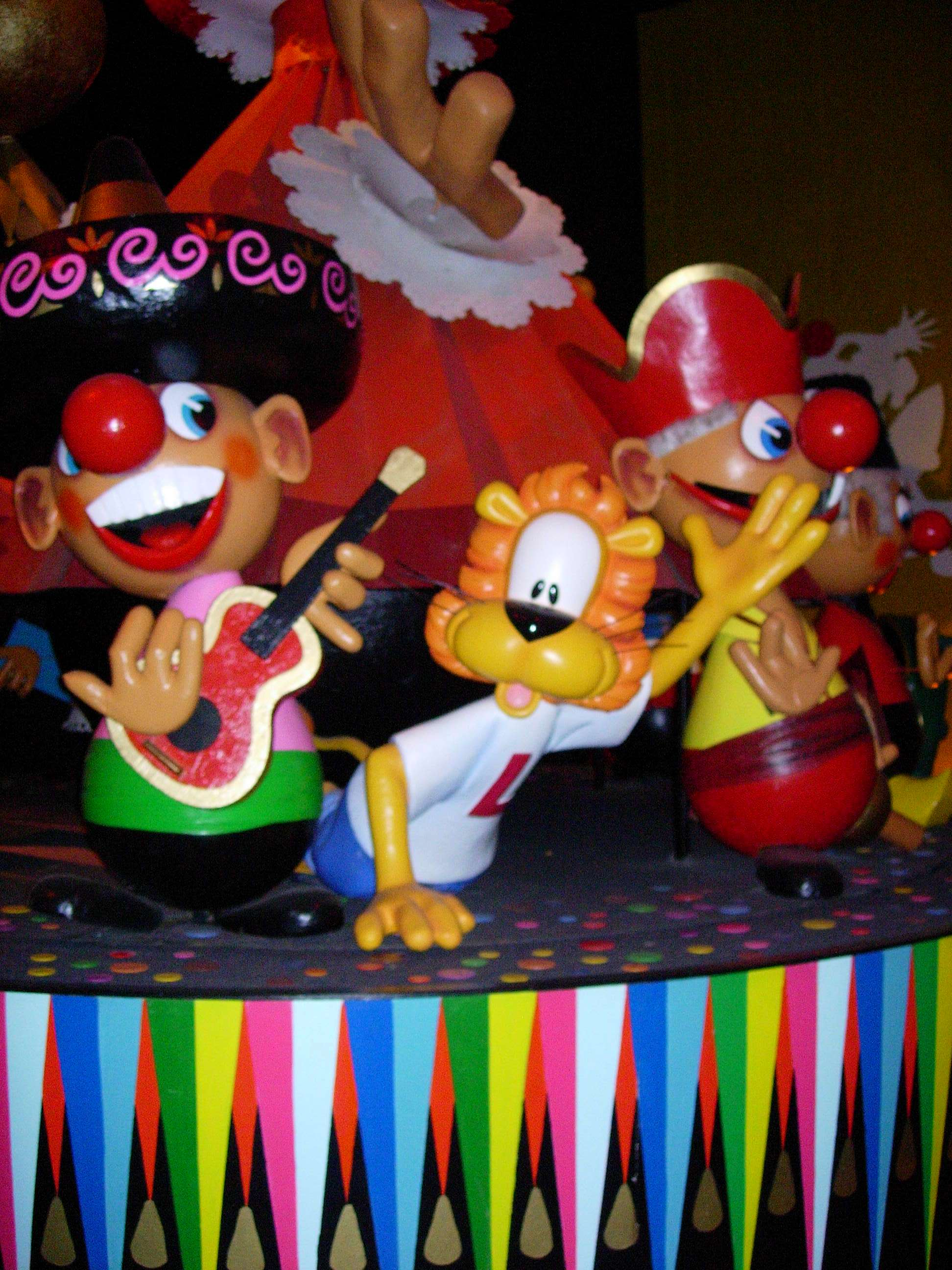
Loeki de Leeuw at the end of Carnival Festival, Efteling

Loeki is the mascot of the theme park Huis ten Bosch, in Nagasaki. His name also inspired three Dutch-language TV awards, namely De Gouden Loeki ("Golden Loeki") for "best TV commercial", its Flemish counterpart De Gouden Welp ("The Golden Lion Cub") and De Loden Leeuw ("The Lead Lion") for "worst TV commercial."

On 16 March 2005, Loeki was supposedly kidnapped by a student from Utrecht, because they did not want him to wither away in a dusty archive. It turned out to be a publicity stunt, when Loeki moved to the Efteling amusement park. After 2005, Loeki was used there to supplement the Carnival Festival. This attraction was also designed in 1984 by Joop Geesink. Loeki was removed from Carnival Festival in 2012 and replaced by their original mascot, Jokie.

On 21 August 2005, Loeki returned to television in a commercial for Edah, as a result of a survey by Maurice de Hond which said that three out of four Dutch wanted to see Loeki again on television. This was Loeki's first appearance on commercial channels. This appearance used 3D animation rather than the traditional stop-motion format.

The European Football Championship 2008 used Loeki in an advertisement for supermarket chain C1000.

In June 2010, Loeki returned to Dutch TV for the 2010 FIFA World Cup promotional activities of Samsung, Samen voor Oranje, coinciding with the participation of the Dutch national football team. Loeki was featured in a TV commercial, online at Facebook, as a car sticker and in a life-size form as part of the Orange "building wrap" on the Samsung headquarters in Delft. The various shapes of the famous multimedia advertising lion are provided by communication Quince. The commercial aired in the break of the main edition of RTL Nieuws on RTL 4 on 7 June 2010.

In 2016, an early Loeki de Leeuw short was featured in a commercial for ING Group.

== Media adaptations ==
A pantomime comic strip was made about the character by Wil Raymakers. It ran in the children's magazine Okki from 1986 on. In 2016, he also inspired a one-shot magazine named Loeki.
