= Bystander (magazine) =

British weekly magazine (1903–1940)

- Editor: William Comyns Beaumont
- Frequency: Weekly
- Publisher: H. R. Baines & Co.
- Founder: George Holt Thomas
- Founded: 1903; 122 years ago
- Final issue: 1940
- Country: United Kingdom

The Bystander was a British weekly tabloid magazine including reviews, topical drawings, cartoons and short stories. Published from Fleet Street, it was started in 1903 by George Holt Thomas. Its first editor, William Comyns Beaumont, later edited the magazine again from 1928 to 1932.

It was popular during World War I for its publication of the "Old Bill" cartoons by Bruce Bairnsfather. The magazine also employed artists including H. M. Bateman, W. Heath Robinson, Howard Elcock, Helen McKie, Arthur Watts, Will Owen, Edmund Blampied and L. R. Brightwell.

It published some of the earliest stories of Daphne du Maurier (Beaumont's niece), as well as short stories by Saki, including "Filboid Studge, the Story of a Mouse that Helped".

The magazine ran until 1940, when it merged with The Tatler (titled Tatler & Bystander until 1968).
