= Television presentation =

Television presentation refers to the way in which television stations present themselves between programs.

It has become increasingly important in the recent multichannel television environment for television stations to create an attractive and distinct on-air appearance, through the various elements that form the 'television presentation' umbrella. These include idents, the short clips that are often shown before a program on many stations. They often consist of an animated form of the station's logo, and many have a continuity announcer who speaks over the clip with information about programs on the station. Some stations, such as BBC One in the UK have used live action idents since 1997. This approach however is less common. Other elements include digital on-screen graphics (DOGs) and End Credit Promotions (ECPs). Computerised graphics have been popular since BBC Two introduced the world's first computer-generated television identification in the summer of 1979. Less than three months later, American broadcaster NBC introduced their first computerised graphics.

There have been several examples of television presentation choices less popular with viewers. In 2002, the new controller of BBC One, Lorraine Heggessey, deemed the package which had been in place since 1997 too "slow and distant". The old package consisted of a hot air balloon with an image of the earth printed on it flying over various landmarks across the UK. The package was unique and certainly popular with viewers. Again, it was a rare example of ordinary people recognising and identifying with a channel's on-air look. Heggessey instead wanted to introduce a set of idents showing people of various cultural backgrounds dancing in different ways.

The style was ridiculed by many, including the BBC's own animated satire Monkey Dust, whose spoofs of the idents included two men engaging in anal sex, and Channel 4's digital channel E4, who spoofed it in a set of their own idents and it also was identified by the public for the wrong reasons.

In the United States, cable channel MTV changes its presentation every few months. However, since its inception, the logo (the letter "M" with "tv" on the lower right side) has always remained the same.

In Japan, the state's public broadcaster NHK has set up an institute, the NHK Broadcasting Culture Research Institute, to preserve historical TV and radio presentations within the country, as well as researches of Japanese broadcasting presentations throughout the years.

== See also ==
- History of BBC television idents
- TVARK, a website which specialises on TV presentations
