= Television closedown routines in the United Kingdom =

Closedown routines are ways in which television channels shut down for a period of time.

In the United Kingdom, television closedowns took place at the end of that day's transmission, and during the early days of broadcasting, during the day. Daytime closedowns, for a few hours at a time, was due initially to Government-imposed restrictions on daytime broadcasting hours, and later, budgetary constrictions. The eventual relaxation of these rules meant that afternoon closedowns ceased permanently on the ITV network in October 1972. The BBC took a long time to abandon the practice, and did not commence a full daytime service on BBC One until the autumn of 1986, and on BBC Two until spring 1990. The closedown announcement on the BBC was made with the station clock displayed on-screen, and would include the time and name of the next programme unless a slide listing the next few programmes on that channel had been shown prior to the appearance of the clock.

A full night-time closedown sequence on British television typically contained information about the following day's schedule, perhaps a weather forecast and/or a news update, possibly a Public Information Film and finally, a look at the station clock and the national anthem.

== BBC ==
=== Television ===
- On BBC One, the sequence was as follows. It began with a rundown of the following evening's schedule, the national weather forecast, a public information film (Monday to Thursday nights only), a closing announcement wishing goodnight to viewers and pointing them towards BBC radio services on air through the night, made over the clock and finally a rendition of the National Anthem (God Save the Queen), played out over the ident (before sometime in the early 1960s, and during both Christmas 1977 and 1992, it was played over a shot of the Queen). This ended in November 1997 when BBC News 24 launched, and the news station has filled the overnight BBC One downtime ever since.
  - In the 1950s, the BBC Television Service ended with the closing bars of Eric Coates' Television March, reinstated for one night only to finish off the BBC's 60th anniversary week, before the national anthem.
  - Before the introduction of television news in 1954, two weather charts were seen, after which the continuity announcer would appear announcing closing time, just after handing over to a recording of the 9pm bulletin from the BBC Home Service. The national anthem was already added by June 1953.
  - During Christmas periods, the British national anthem was played over the specific season's Christmas idents instead of the usual globe idents, with the exceptions of the Christmas seasons of 1977 and 1992, which played the anthem over a portrait of the Queen (and during parts of the 1977 season, a photo of the Jubilee Crest on the BBC Broadcasting House's rooftop), and the Christmas seasons of 1985 and 1994, which played the anthem over the standard globe ident. Its regional networks also played the British national anthem over their specific regional ident.
  - In Wales, three bars of the Welsh anthem and one bar of the British anthem were played. At Christmas, carols were often played instead of the anthems.
  - Years after the launch of BBC News 24, several early day motions were proposed to reinstate the national anthem at the handover. Such proposals were made in 2002 (the Queen's Jubilee Year), 2006, 2010, 2016 and 2022. All of these proposals were suggested by Conservative MP Andrew Rosindell, the last of which coincided with the Queen's Platinum Jubilee year. All of them were eventually rejected. The 2022 proposal was rejected on the grounds that the BBC was an independent body editorially independent from the Government and did not meet parliamentary petition standards.
- For many years, BBC One in Scotland, Wales and Northern Ireland also signed off with a late news bulletin & local weather forecast read off-screen by the duty continuity announcer. Wales retained its closedown news summary until c.2002, some years after the practice ended elsewhere.
- From the late 1960s until 12 September 1980, the English regions outside London and the South East ran their own closedown sequences on weekdays, generally including a late regional news and weather bulletin (BBC East aired a national news summary instead of a regional one) but also - depending on the region - features such as an events guide, competitions and a BBC2-style picture montage accompanied by easy listening music. Following the end of the regional closedowns, London was responsible for all national continuity for England. The final closedown for the North West was an extended segment delivered by John Mundy. After the news bulletin, he made a final message which included a retrospective of the late night news and the features it had, including the quizzes. This was followed by a montage of photos of local staff.
  - After this practice ended, regional closedowns became very rare but one example followed local opt-outs after the end of the main Children in Need programme had finished; in such situations, there was no closing announcement, leading directly to the national anthem.
- On BBC Two, a look at the following evening's schedule, or occasionally instead by news of individual programmes/films related to the output that had just ended, was followed by a closing announcement over the station clock. BBC2 never closed with the National Anthem and the clock just faded to black following the closing announcement, although picture montages accompanied by easy listening music regularly followed the closing announcement until the early 1980s, after which such montages were only transmitted very rarely. From 1994 to 1998, one of the idents and stings would play in full following the clock before the fade to black. On nights in which Open University programmes were the last programmes on that night, the OU ident was played at closedown, followed by the usual fade to black, with the announcement often making no reference to BBC2, instead using words to the effect of "that's all from the Open University for tonight. Good night." This procedure was discontinued when The Learning Zone started airing OU programmes during the night. From October 1995 until the completion of digital switchover, overnight dead air time was filled by music and a broadcast of Ceefax, the BBC's Teletext service, although all-night downtime Ceefax broadcasts did not begin until the end of the 1990s. Since October 2012, a loop showcasing brief snippets of current and forthcoming BBC Two programmes is shown during BBC Two's overnight downtime.
  - Certain Christmas closedowns omitted the clock and played the ident instead.
- Prior to the shutdown of BBC Three's television channel in 2016, the CBBC Channel would go off air at 7 pm each night, as it shared its signal and bandwidth with BBC Three, which commenced programming each evening at the same time. During the closedown sequence, the host on air would say goodnight to the audience, then a brief piece of footage would play until exactly 7:00 pm, when the handover took place. The signal would be handed back to CBBC each morning at around 5 am when BBC Three had its own closedown; to fill the remaining two and a half hours until morning programming commenced, the channel would then air a compilation on repeat, This is CBBC. CBeebies, which shares its signal with BBC Four, carries out a similar process of signing off and handing over each evening at 7 pm. BBC Three returned to television in 2022, and once again shares its bandwidth with CBBC, airing from 7 pm to 4 am every night.

=== Radio ===
- BBC Radio 4 "closes down" in a sense, at just before 1 am with a rendition of the National Anthem (God Save the King) before handing over to programming from the BBC World Service.
- Until it adopted 24-hour broadcasting in 1991, BBC Radio 1 would finish its day with a jingle played at the end of the final programme.
- BBC Radio 3 and BBC Radio 5 would sign off with a closing announcement after the day's final news bulletin.
- BBC Local Radio's day never ended with a closedown as they handed over to a national BBC network. Initially this was BBC Radio 2 although most stations took the BBC World Service during the 1990s. BBC Radio 5 Live was the overnight filler on all stations by the end of the 1990s.
- As with BBC Local Radio, the BBC's national radio stations also carried a UK-wide station during downtime. BBC Radio Scotland initially took BBC Radio 4 due to Radio 4 not being on VHF/FM across most of Scotland until the end of the 1980s. BBC Radio Ulster, for the same reason, carried Radio 4 during evening downtime but kept their transmitters open through the night by carrying BBC Radio 2. Now, all stations broadcast Five Live overnight with its exceptions being that of BBC Radio Cymru, which carries the World Service, and its DAB only sister station BBC Radio Cymru 2, which simulcasts Radio 2.

== ITV ==
- Grampian, Scottish, UTV, Tyne Tees, ATV, HTV, Anglia, LWT, Channel, Southern and its successor TVS and Westward and its successor TSW, closed transmission with God Save the Queen – mainly over scenes of the Royal Family. From 1962, TWW and its successor HTV Wales also played Hen Wlad Fy Nhadau in addition to God Save the Queen. ATV chose to utilise a version of the national anthem, played on a church organ over the station clock whereas other stations chose to utilise regular band arrangements. Granada and Central never closed with the national anthem, Granada being the first company not to do so due to the political outlook of its owners, which caused boycotts from advertisers. Thames, Border and Yorkshire closed with the national anthem at first, but had abandoned this practice by the time VCRs came to market in the 1970s. Thames subsequently would close with samples of easy listening pop music tracks, Border and Yorkshire would just fade to black when the second hand reached the next quarter hour marker.
  - Granada and Yorkshire would only play the anthem at closedowns during the Queen's birthdays. On 13 June 1986, Granada played the anthem at closedown over a graphic of the Queen's portrait with text underneath wishing her a happy birthday. At the same date in 1982, Yorkshire played the anthem over the clock.
- Granada and Central played out with special arrangements of their station themes. TSW also used their station theme That's Soul, Write as part of their closing sequence. Thames played either easy listening, popular or instrumental library music over a programme menu and the clock. Scottish also used various pieces of library music for playout during a rundown of programmes for the next day but still ended with the national anthem. Border and Yorkshire chose to simply fade out following the closedown announcement accompanied by the station clock.
- Grampian, Ulster and Border also signed off with late regional news bulletins read by the duty announcer. For a time, a farming news bulletin, Farming Brief, ran as part of TVS's closing sequence. Most regions also signed off with a weather forecast whilst Westward and TSW also provided a Shipping Forecast. Westward also aired short bumpers of Loeki – a cartoon lion whose adventures had bookended the advert breaks on Dutch public television since the early 1970s – prior to switching off the main transmission stream. Some regions (namely Central, Grampian, Granada, LWT, Scottish, TSW, Tyne Tees and Yorkshire) also included a short announcement advertising Independent Local Radio stations in their respective areas as part of their closing sequences.
- A special handover was done on Thames when handing over to London Weekend Television. In the black-and-white phase, the announcer at the end of the Thames schedule for Friday (6:59pm) announced that broadcasts resumed on Monday morning without mentioning LWT. LWT on its behalf opened with an authority announcement, as if it were a morning start-up. After the start of colour broadcasts, the formalities had been toned down.
- The ITV regions gradually switched to 24-hour television between 1986 and 1988, under a directive issued by the IBA. Yorkshire Television was first to go round the clock showing programmes from the satellite station Music Box. However, Music Box shut down at the start of 1987 and YTV went back to a nightly closedown although it did air a Teletext information service called Jobfinder for an hour after sign-off. In August 1987, Thames/LWT and Anglia began through-the-night broadcasting (Thames had already extended broadcast hours to around 4 am earlier in 1987). The other major regions including Granada, Central, Yorkshire and TVS slowly followed suit during the first half of 1988, although many had been broadcasting until around 3 am for some time, especially at the weekend. By the start of September 1988 the last regions – Tyne Tees, Border, TSW and Grampian went 24 hours although Ulster did not start round-the-clock broadcasting until 3 October 1988. Some overnight programming slots, typically between around 4 am and 5 am, were filled with Jobfinder, which some regions adopted and others did not, and, since 1998, ITV Nightscreen, which was replaced in 2021 by Unwind with ITV (Unwind with STV on STV in Central Scotland and North of Scotland).
- Two popular scenes were inspired by the early years of television; firstly, the phrase "Don't forget to switch off your television set" (and on rare occasion, "Don't forget to switch off your television set, and unplug it from the socket"). The phrase was usually spoken over a completely blank screen (in Granada's case, it was a screen advertising independent radio stations), often after a moment of complete silence; or dead air, prior to the transmitter being switched off. It was used as a warning to not leave your television on, and to not leave it plugged in; doing so on early television sets ran the risk of the television overheating and subsequently catching fire. The second scene involved the "little white dot", a phosphor trace which lingered on the screen as the power faded, slowly shrinking in size until eventually fading away completely.

== Channel 4 & S4C ==
- Channel 4 closed down with the clock and a play-out of the exploding station ident before fading to black and after a minute or so the Channel 4 testcard (previously the IBA ETP-1 testcard) appeared. Channel 4 was the only TV station to show the testcard at closedown as the BBC just radiated tone for ten minutes after closedown before the transmitters were switched off for the night, apart from in 1988 when teletext pages are sometimes shown, airing for a few minutes after the end of the closedown sequence, and after a brief showing of the ETP-1 testcard. The pages are accompanied by tone, and end when transmitters disconnect from the Channel 4 feed ahead of each transmitter’s overnight switch-off.
  - Channel 4 (which, at launch in 1982, was usually closed for around sixteen hours a day) began its 24-hour service on 6 January 1997, after gradually expanding its overnight hours since into-the-night broadcasts began in 1987, and from 1993, teletext pages, with tone, were shown throughout the overnight downtime as, by then, the closedown period was often little more than a couple of hours.
- On occasion, the spinning station ident was used instead, accompanied by a softer, quieter arrangement of the station's main song, 'Fourscore'. It was mainly used when an important figure in politics had died.
- S4C, the Welsh-language channel, continues to sign off each night, although since 2011, it does air English-language infomercials for 2 hours after closedown. For several years, the channel aired delayed full broadcasts of the day's plenary meetings and committee hearings from the National Assembly of Wales at the end of the day's regular programming.

== See also ==
- Sign-on and sign-off
