= TVARK =

Website for television broadcasting archives with sound, video clips and images

TVARK – The Online Television Museum

- TVARK's homepage (since 2022)
- Website type: Sound, video and image archive
- Founded: 1998
- Headquarters: United Kingdom
- Founder: Steve Hackett
- Revenue: Donations
- Website: www.tvark.org
- Commercial: No
- Launched: 8 November 1998; 27 years ago

TVARK is an online archival website of images, sound and video clips illustrating British television presentation history. Content includes idents, programme promotions, title sequences, public information films, commercials, daily start-ups and closedowns, break bumpers and station clocks. Each item has a short written analysis.

The selection of clips represents the work of many broadcasting and production companies, principally the national and regional divisions of the BBC and ITV, plus Channel 4/S4C, Channel 5, various British Sky Broadcasting (formerly Sky Television and British Satellite Broadcasting) networks, and a few other digital, satellite and cable channels. Programme clips are grouped into genres such as quiz shows, fundraising events and imported shows.

This website is dedicated to the founder's late mother, Valerie Hackett.

== History ==
Television Ark was founded in the dial-up era on 8 November 1998, as a one-man hobby site, with a limited number of pages and downloadable low-resolution clips. Over the years, clips and images grew in size and quantity. The site expanded and was run entirely as a hobby by an eight-man team.

During the summer of 2006, it was announced on their home page that they were having a summer break and would relaunch the site in the future. The site relaunched on 25 December 2006 with very limited content, as well as few higher-quality clips put into a new download system in an effort to prevent hotlinking and preserve bandwidth. In addition, the relaunch saw the addition of a semi-transparent watermark (DOG) to new clips added to the site, to discourage "web snatching" of clips.

In July 2009, TVARK announced the end of RealMedia used on the site, with videos now using Adobe Flash streaming in H.264/MPEG-4 AVC, and the service called TVARK Interactive will include user accounts commenting on video statistics.

Since mid-2016, updates have ceased on the site. However, its social media pages are being regularly updated with new material, with the site itself being offline starting in March 2017 for the preparation of a "brand new website". The site originally stated it would return "later in 2017". However, subsequent delays had continued to push back the launch date of the new site resulting in the site being offline for the rest of the decade. According to a message on the TVARK home page, the team were aiming to launch the new site "as soon as possible".

=== Forums ===
It was decided in late December 2005 by TVARK's owners to close its forums. The forum was originally scheduled to close on 31 December, however the forums were removed earlier than planned on 18 December of that year.

== Submitting material ==
The organisers accept tapes of vintage television presentation through the post.

Formats accepted by TVARK (in alphabetical order):

- Betacam SP (PAL)
- Betamax (PAL)
- Digital Betacam (PAL)
- DVCAM (PAL)
- DVCPRO (PAL)
- DVD-R / DVD+R (PAL & NTSC)
- HDCAM
- Mini DV (PAL)
- N1500/N1700
- U-matic
- Video 2000
- VHS (PAL & NTSC)

== See also ==
- Prewar television stations
- Timeline of the introduction of television in countries
- Timeline of the introduction of color television in countries
- Geographical usage of television
- List of years in British television
