= Will Owen (illustrator) =

English illustrator (1869–1957)

An advertisement for Lux illustrated by Owen

Will Owen (1869 – 14 April 1957) was an English book illustrator, cartoonist, caricaturist and a commercial and poster artist, possibly best known for his iconic images of the Bisto Kids, Bovril, Lux and Lifebuoy. He received his art training at the Lambeth School of Art, and evolved a style similar to that of Tom Browne and John Hassall.

Owen was born in Malta, the son of a Royal Navy engineer, and received his first education at Sir Joseph Williamson's Mathematical School in Rochester. Before becoming a full-time illustrator, he worked at the Post Office Savings Bank where he met the writer W. W. Jacobs whose novels and short stories for The Strand Magazine he illustrated for many years. Owen himself wrote short stories, eventually joining the East Kent Mercury where he worked as a journalist. During the First World War he produced cartoons for the Illustrated Sporting and Dramatic News, introducing readers to new terms such as 'strafe', 'Blighty', 'pipsqueak' and 'brass'.

Owen produced highly popular cartoons for the Bystander and The Sketch, and designed some posters for the Underground Group in 1926. His profusely illustrated guide, Old London Town, was published in New York by Robert M. McBride in 1922 and has been placed on the web by Project Gutenberg.

His work was usually signed "WO" or "WILL OWEN" in a cartouche.
