= Helen McKie =

British artist and illustrator

Helen Madeleine McKie (11 October 1889 – 28 February 1957) was a British artist and illustrator.

== Early life ==
McKie was born in Bayswater, London to Douglas Allan McKie, an Australian-born bank clerk of Scottish descent, and Lucy Anne Wernham, daughter of a builder from Newbury, Berkshire, and spent her early childhood on Craven Terrace in Paddington. The family later moved out to Clapham and then Kingston. McKie attended Tiffin Girls' School and studied at the Lambeth School of Art.

== Career ==
After leaving art school, McKie became a member of staff to Bystander magazine from 1915 to 1929. She was also a contributing artist to The Graphic, Sphere, Autocar, and Queen publications.

She illustrated books, created mural designs, and painted the artwork for posters. Her most famous works are the pair posters "Waterloo Station – War" and "Waterloo Station – Peace" which were published by Southern Railway in 1948 to celebrate the centenary of Waterloo station.

During the First World War, a lot of her drawings focused on the war effort. After the war, she sketched scenes taking place at London nightclubs.
