= Arthur E. Becher =

American illustrator

- Becher in his studio painting in 1957
- Born: Arthur Ernst Becher; July 29, 1877; Freiburg, German Empire
- Died: November 4, 1960 (aged 83); Poughkeepsie, New York, US
- Known for: Illustration

Arthur Ernst Becher (July 29, 1877 – November 4, 1960) was an American artist and illustrator. Becher's career spanned 40 years, during which he illustrated for many of the leading magazines of the day including Collier's Weekly, McCall's, Ladies' Home Journal, Scribner's Magazine and Pictorial Review. He was a member of the Society of Illustrators and the Salmagundi Club.

== Background ==
Arthur Becher was born on July 29, 1877, in Freiberg, Germany, and emigrated to Milwaukee, Wisconsin with his three brothers and parents at the age of four. He joined Milwaukee Art Student's League and sketched at Jones Island with Louis Mayer and other artists. In 1899, he moved with William Aylward to Wilmington, Delaware. For a couple of years starting in 1902 he studied under illustrator Howard Pyle.

Becher practiced photography during this period, and in 1902 he participated in the first exhibition of the Photo-Secession, a group of pictorialist photographers selected by Alfred Stieglitz. In 1904, he married Freida L. Knappe and moved to Ardsley, New York. Freida was frequently a model for his book and magazine illustrations.

In 1908, Appleton's Magazine sent Becher to London where he sketched the Elgin Marbles at the British Museum. While in Europe he took the opportunity to study oil painting with the German artist Otto Leopold Strutzel.

Becher's career spanned 40 years, during which he illustrated for many of the leading magazines of the day including Collier's Weekly, McCall's, Ladies' Home Journal, Scribner's Magazine and Pictorial Review. He used drawing media such as carbon or charcoal pencil for many of his illustrations but also worked in large scale oil painting. He sometimes painted landscapes. Many of his works had allegorical themes. He was also a member of the Society of Illustrators and the Salmagundi Club.

In 1959, the common council of Milwaukee purchased some of Becher's work depicting Jones Island for $1,800.

Becher died on November 4, 1960, in Poughkeepsie, New York.

== Auction records ==
- New York, December 2, 1982: Landscapes (two oils on canvas, 16 by 20 inches [40.6 cm × 50.8 cm]) $750.00 (equivalent to US$2,502 in 2025)
- New York, April 4, 1984: Train Carriage Fording a Stream (oil on card, 18 1/4 by 22 inches [46.4 cm × 55.9 cm]) $950.00 (equivalent to US$2,944 in 2025)
- New York, March 15, 1986: War and Peace (1935, oil on canvas, 38 1/4 by 32 inches [97.2 cm × 81.3 cm]) $1,700.00 (equivalent to US$4,993 in 2025)
- New York, November 14, 1991: Baby's First Christmas (oil on canvas, 33 3/4 by 24 inches [85.7 cm × 61.0 cm]) $8,250.00 (equivalent to US$19,501 in 2025)
- New York, November 28, 1995: Procession with Carriage (1948, oil on canvas, 30 by 40 1/4 inches [76.2 cm × 102.2 cm]) $2,300 (equivalent to US$4,860 in 2025)

== Gallery ==
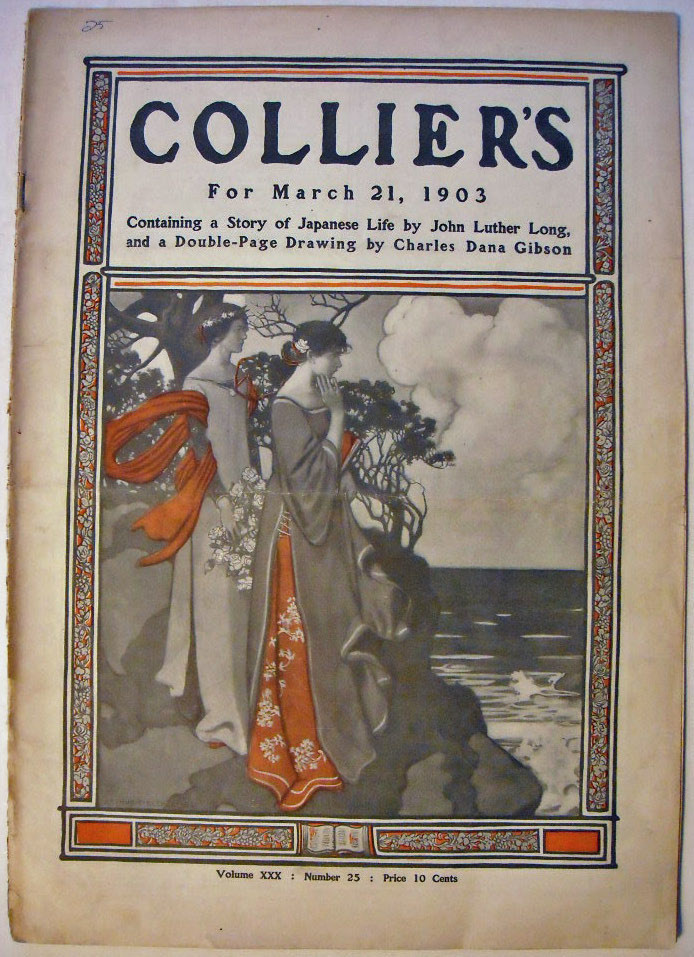
Collier's Weekly cover, March 21, 1903.

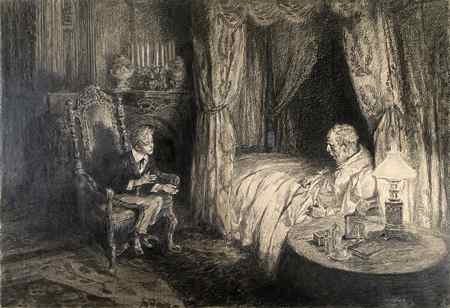
"You were happy!" said the king. "You were disobedient. You were causing grave anxiety and you were happy! The first duty of a prince is to his country." (1916) 15 3/8 x 22 3/8 inches. Collection of the Delaware Art Museum

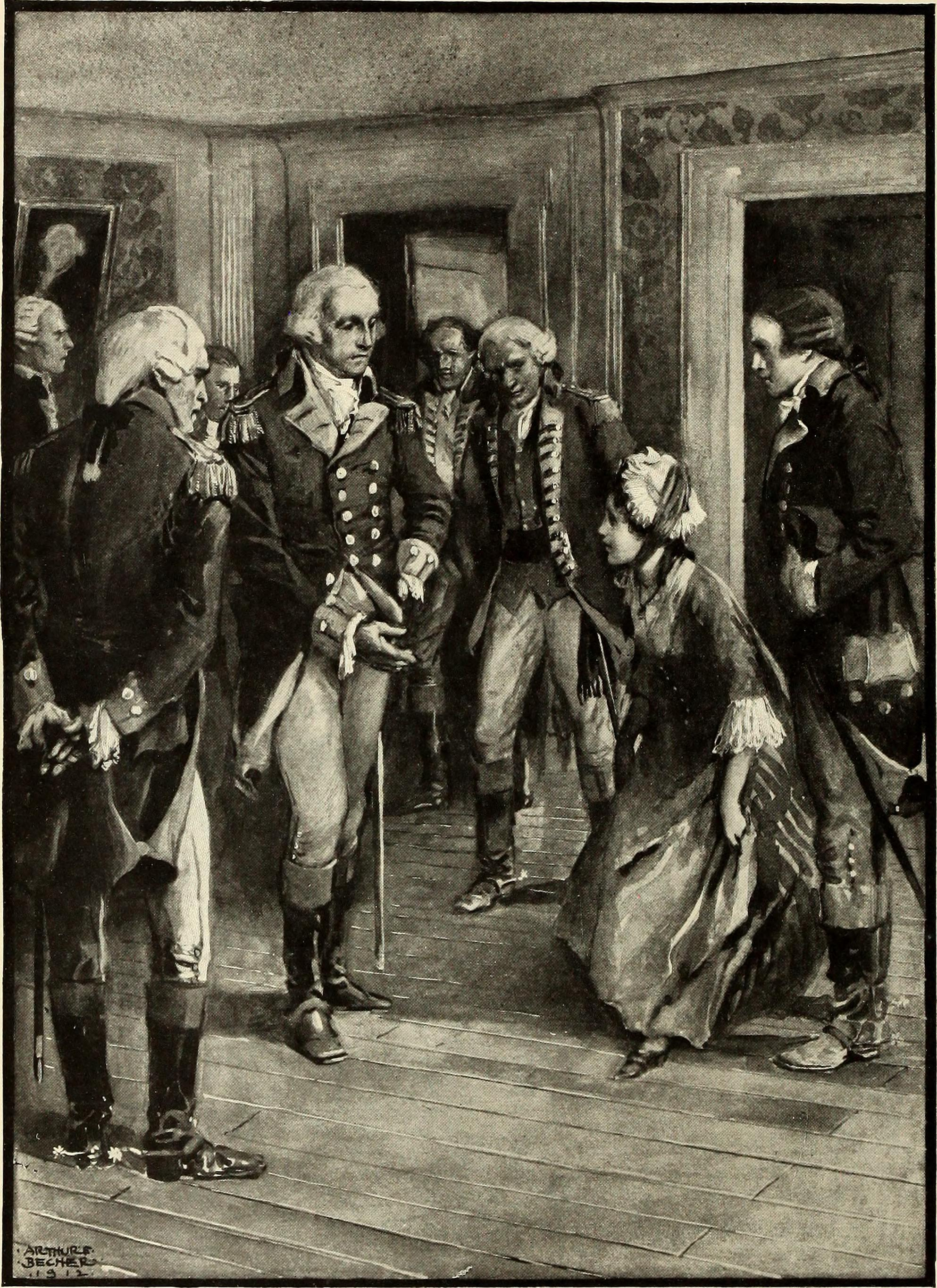
St. Nicholas (serial) (1873)

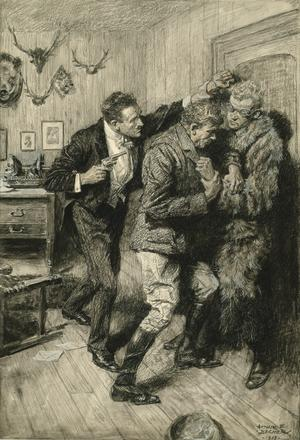
Nikky's resistance to search, with the revolver so close, was short-lived (1917); 24 5/8 by 17 5/8 inches Collection of the Delaware Art Museum

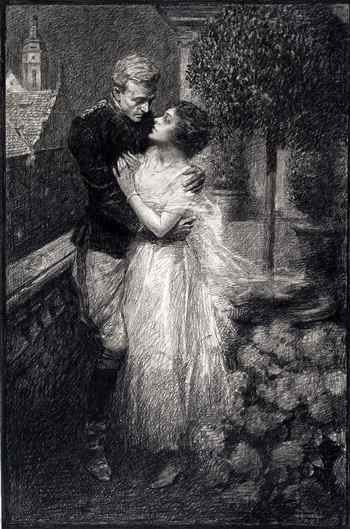
Nikky, you are going to take me away, aren't you? (1917) 20 x 13 1/4 inches. Collection of the Delaware Art Museum

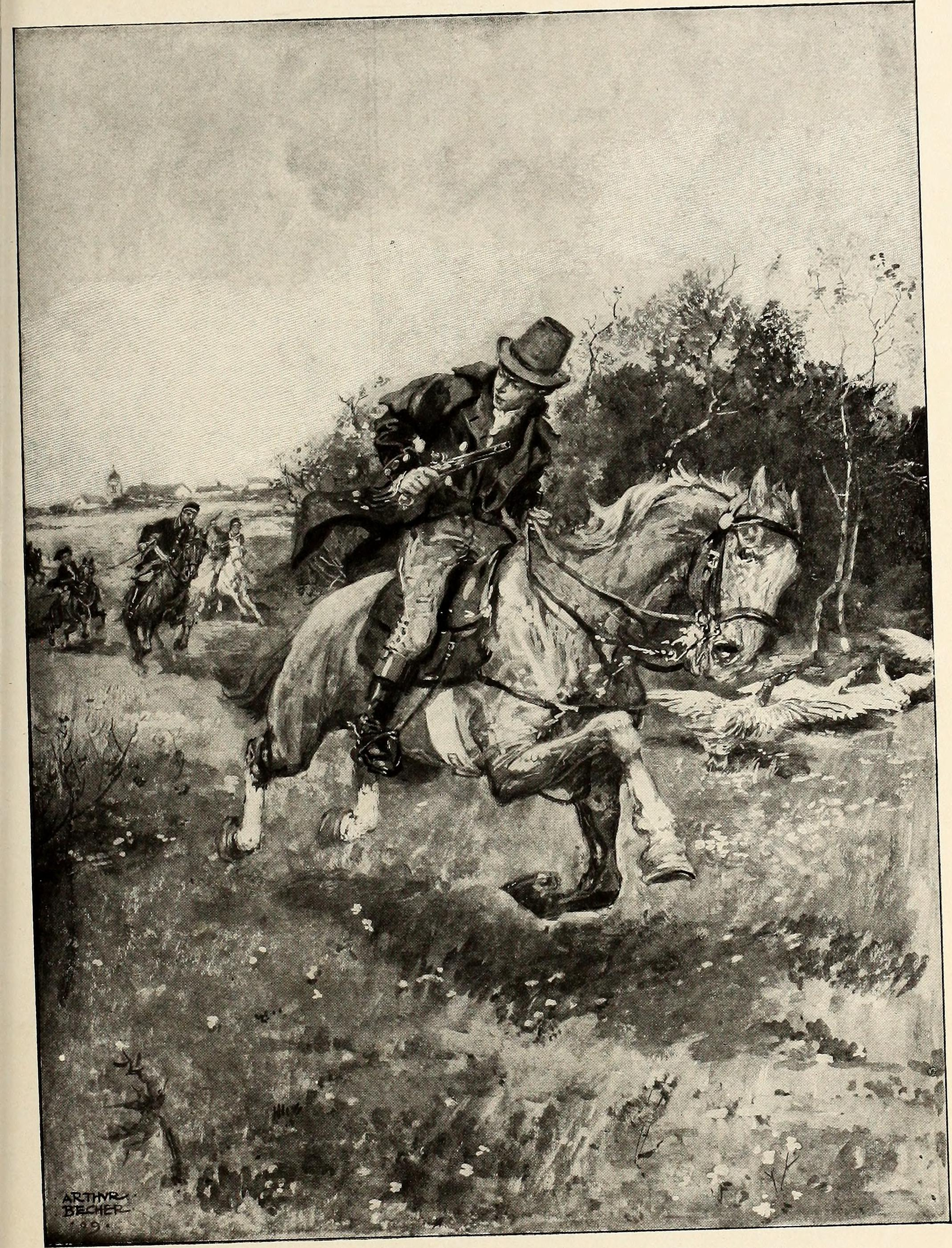
Jerry Abershaw, chased by the King' dragons
