= Carnival Festival =

Amusement park ride in the Netherlands

Carnaval Festival
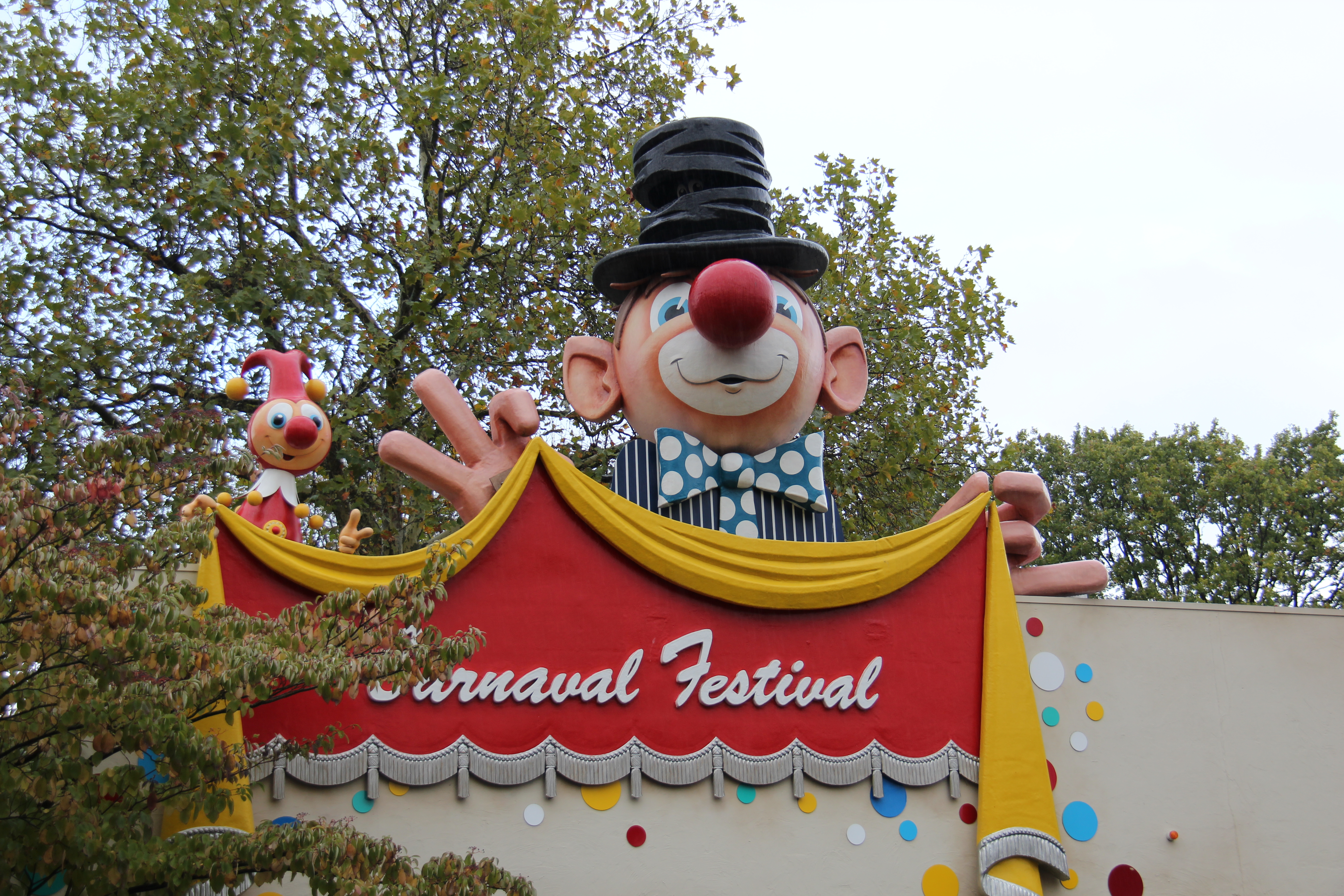
- Ride entrance

Efteling
- Area: Reizenrijk
- Coordinates: 51.6524°N 5.0524°E
- Status: Operating
- Cost: 9.1 million NGL
- Opening date: June 1, 1984

Ride statistics
- Attraction type: dark ride
- Manufacturer: Mack Rides
- Designer: Joop Geesink
- Capacity: 1750 riders per hour
- Vehicles: 118
- Duration: 8:25
- Height restriction: 100 cm (3 ft 3 in)
- Wheelchair accessible

Carnival Festival (or "Carnaval Festival" in Dutch) is a dark ride in amusement park Efteling in the Netherlands. It was designed by Joop Geesink and opened its doors in 1984.

== History and details ==
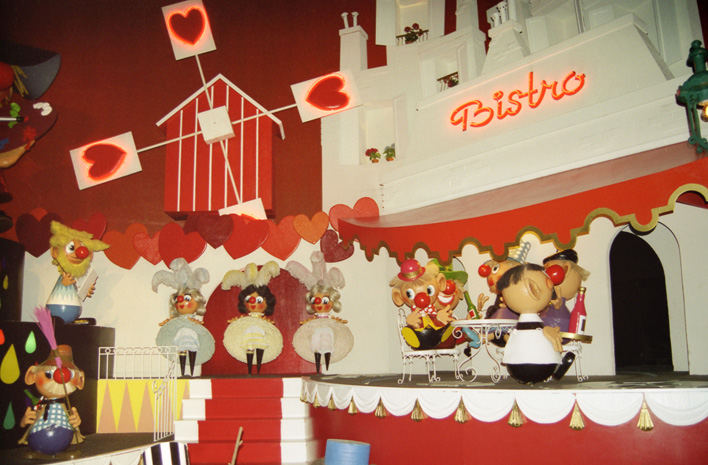
Paris

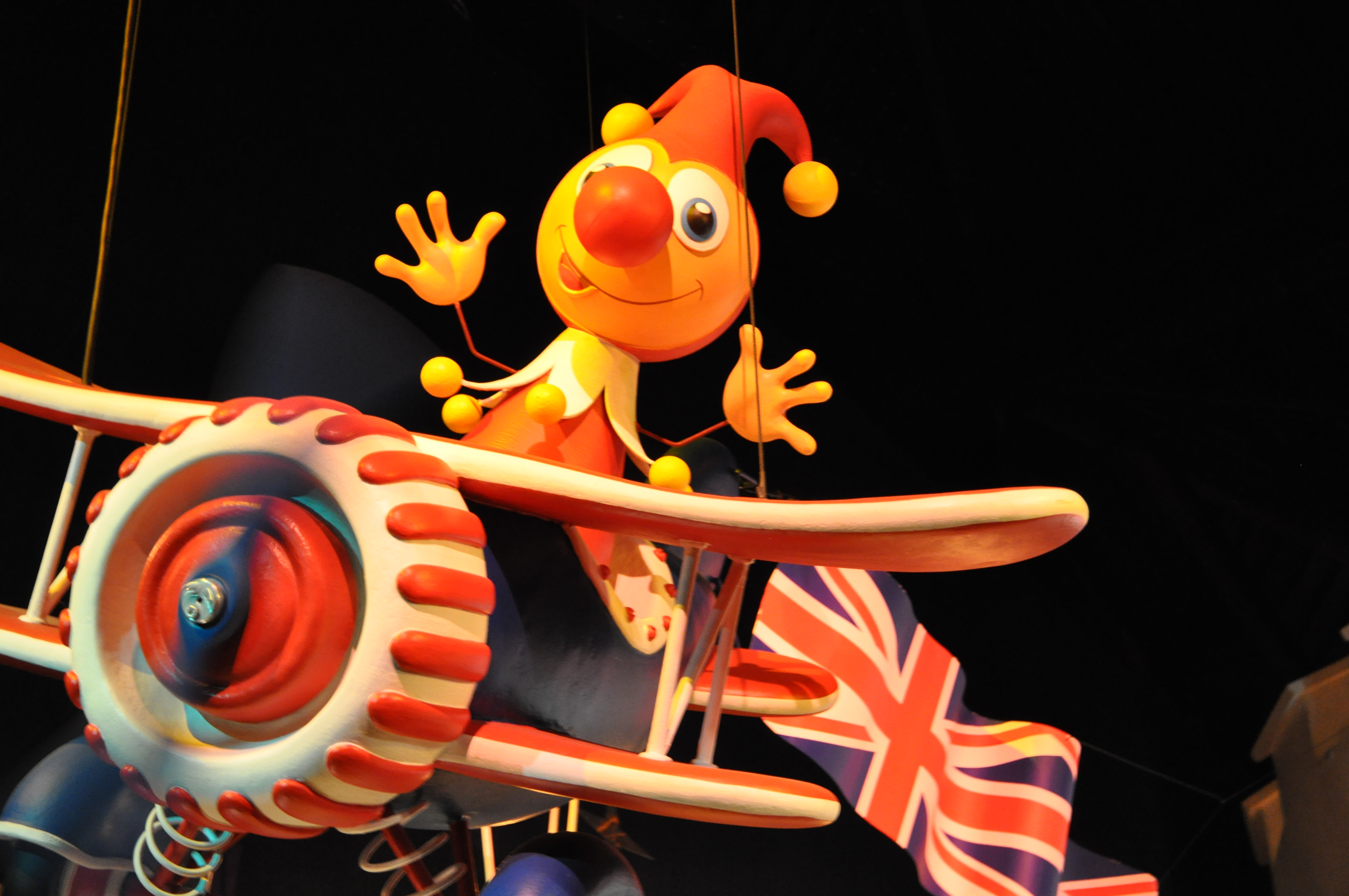
Jokie with Union Jack

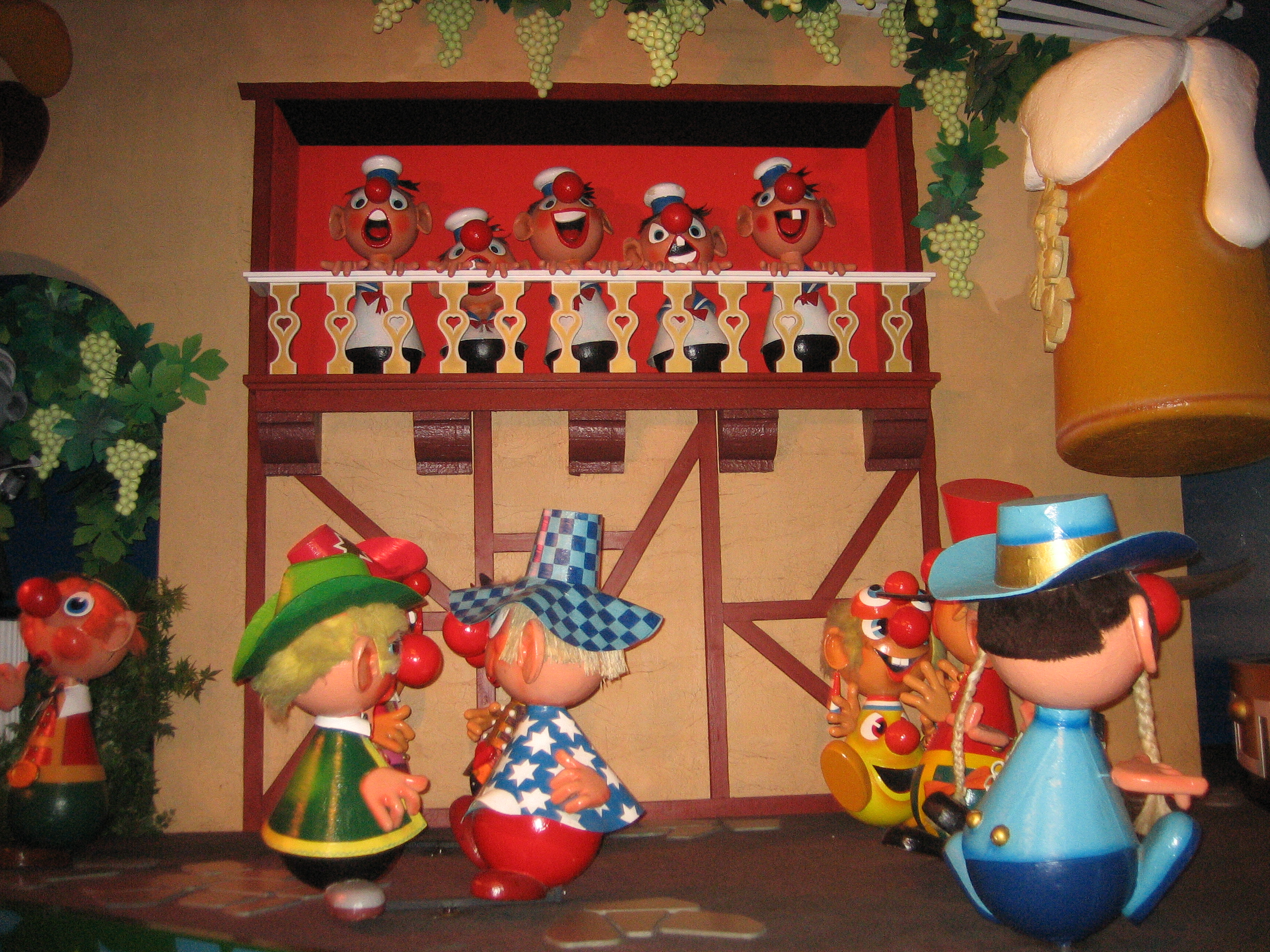
Festival in Germany

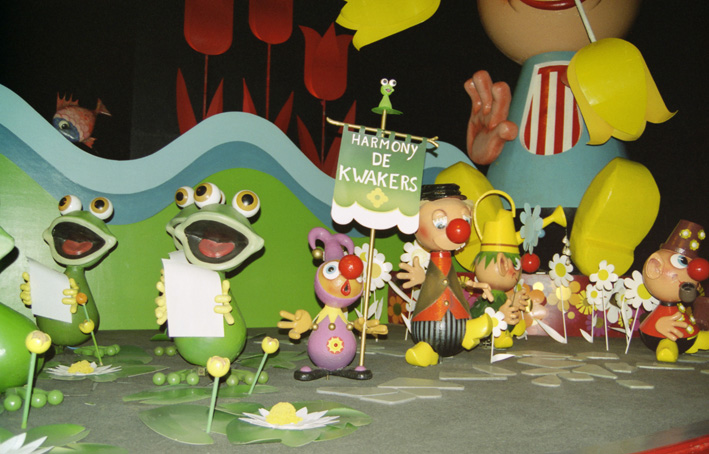
The Netherlands

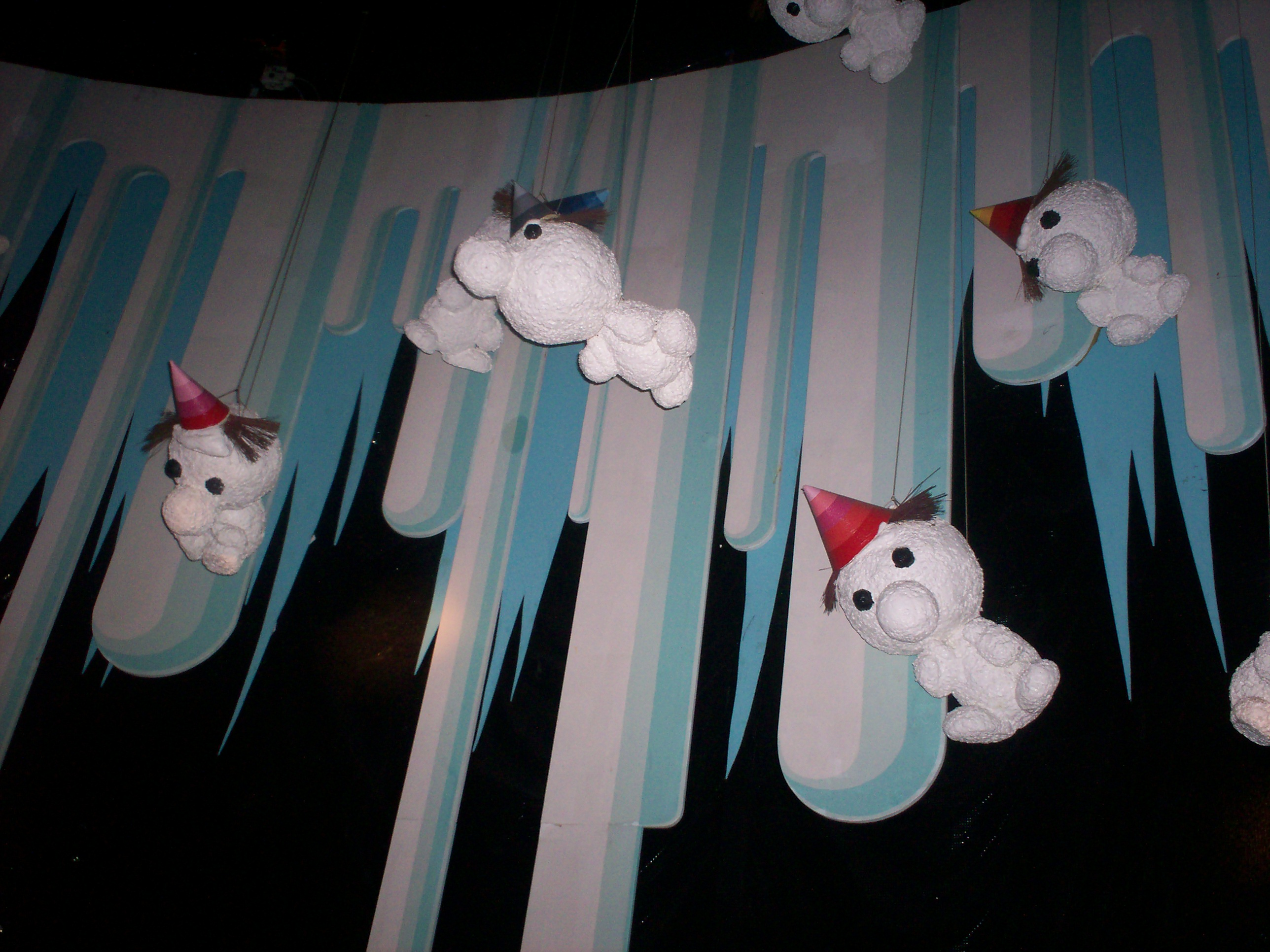
Icemen

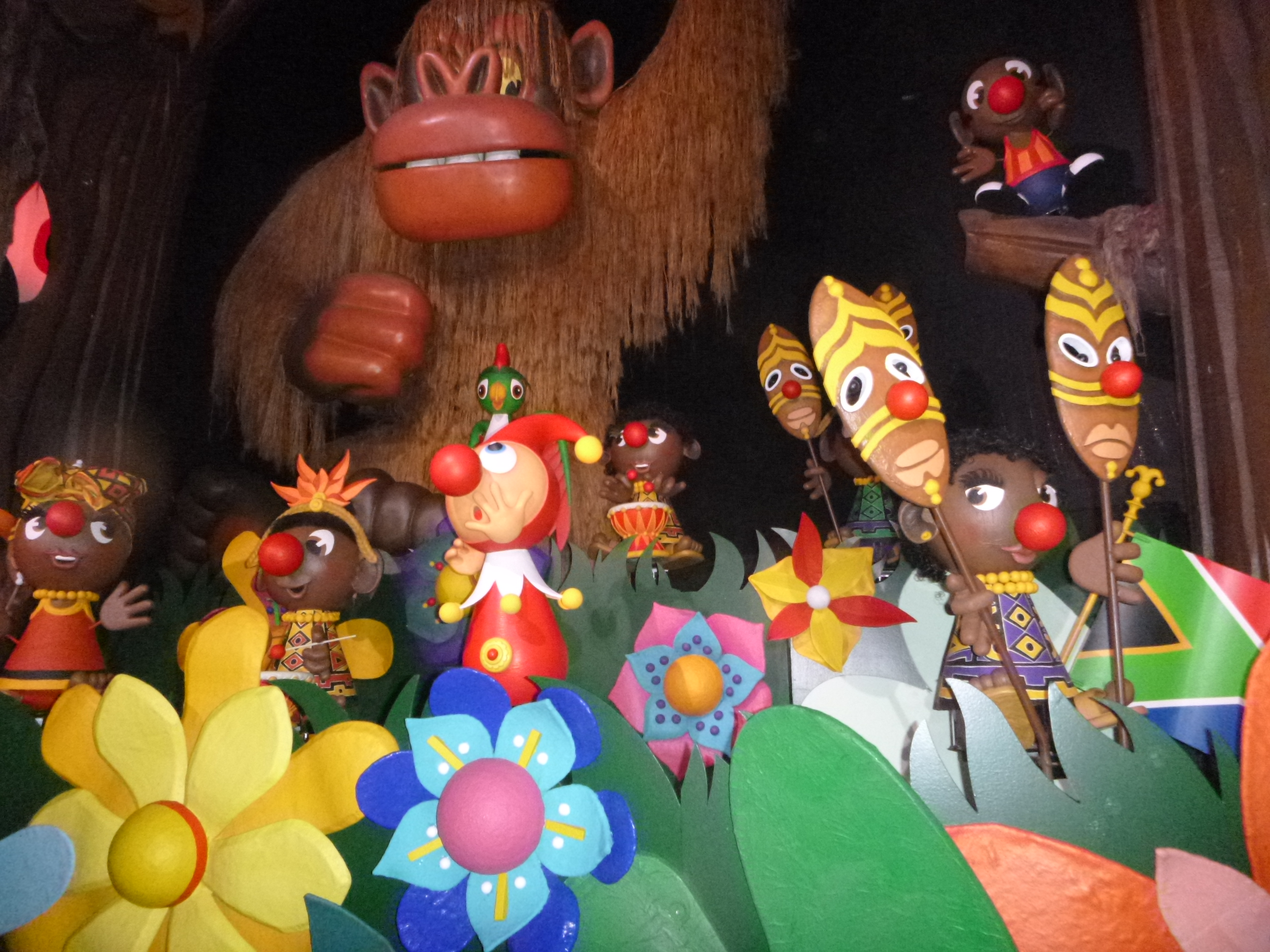
Africa

The ride system was built by Mack Rides, the ride has a track length of 240m. The ride cost €4.1m (NGL 9 million). The ride concept is original, but clearly influenced by Disney’s "It's a Small World" attraction at the Disney Parks, and signified a breach with the fairy-tale style of the Efteling. The ride takes 2 adults or 3 children, in 1 of the 118 cars, through a humorous simplification of the world populated by animatronics in just over 6 minutes, accompanied by a catchy music written by Ruud Bos, and singer and stand-up comedian Toon Hermans. The ride’s host is ‘Jokie de Prrretneus’, a carnival doll and the park's mascot from 1984 until 1989 when the new mascot ‘Pardoes’ was introduced. In 2005 the ride was redecorated with the famous Dutch doll "Loekie de Leeuw", which also was created by Joop Geesink. Joop Geesink's objective was to make it a hilarious ride, which is done by taking cultural aspects that have been generalized, and portraying them with funny dolls. In 2019 the ride closed for an extensive refurbishment. The lighting was upgraded to LED, the dolls were repainted and the Japan, China and Africa scenes were changed. Also in addition the gondolas would now stop periodically so that the fanfare portion would play.

== Ride ==
The ride passes through 9 different regions, each represented by typical scenes and variations on the music.

Netherlands
The first land the ride passes through is the Netherlands. Scenes of singing frogs, birds, fishermen, tulips, wooden shoes and farmers represent the Dutch cultural icons.
Belgium, Monaco and France
After a short scene of Belgium the rides jumps from the Mediterranean to Paris, portrayed by can-can dancers in front of the Moulin Rouge.
United Kingdom
Next in line is the British capital, London. Scenes here show the Underground, Buckingham Palace and the changing of the guard. The Scottish Highlands are also present.
Germany and the Alps
This region is represented by Oktoberfest, where everybody is happily drinking beer, including a group of monks. Alpine mountain scenes conclude this part.
Italy
Here we see Venice, Pisa and a reference to Rome’s imperial history.
Japan and China
This scene opens with a tunnel decorated with Japanese Noh stage masks, followed by Geisha women, sumo wrestling and a Chinese Shadow play. China is portrayed by a large scene with a dragon.
The Arctic
This scene is of an icy world filled with igloos and Inuit and many penguin-sized, snowman-like creatures. After this scene, riders pass through a tunnel where many of these creatures stare down through holes in the ceiling.
Africa
Large trees appear with a giant monkey, and traditional African people are playing drums.
Mexico and Hawaii
Little donkeys transport Mexicans with sombreros, maracas, guitars and trumpets. Hawaiian Hula girls bid us a farewell.

== Music ==
For Carnival Festival, Efteling commissioned its first original soundtrack, which was composed by Toon Hermans and arranged and produced by Ruud Bos. Each of the ride's scenes features its own variation on the theme music.

Since 2019, if a disabled person boards the attraction, fanfare music will play.
