= Psuko Shel Yom =

Religious program

- Opening caption
- פסוקו של יום
- Genre: Religious
- Created by: Benyamin Zvieli
- Country of origin: Israel

Production
- Running time: 3 Minutes
- Production company: Israel Broadcasting Authority (IBA)

Original release
- Network: Channel 1 (IBA)
- Release: November 1969 – 2012

Psuko Shel Yom (Hebrew: פסוקו של יום, Psuqo shel yom, lit. "[The] Verse Of The Day") was an Israeli daily midnight minutes-long program-segment aired on the public Channel 1, reciting selected daily biblical, Midrash or Aggadah verses.

Psuko Shel Yom was aired on a daily basis just as the Israeli public channel retired for the night and closed its broadcast. The channel was for many years the only one in Israel, and therefore the program aired just in time before people fell asleep, and it became an Israeli culture-cult segment.

== Description ==
Psuko Shel Yom is aired at midnight and has been broadcasting the same platform-content for over thirty years. The TV screen displays the verses with biblical fonts while the reciter (not shown), Mordechai Freidman, reads the selected passage, and while the "Yad" (Torah Pointer) moves through with the verses of the page, at pace with the reciter. A short musical segment, in "biblical" style music, is always played at the beginning and the end of the program. It also became a cultural-cult sound track associated with Psuko shel Yom. At the conclusion of the program, in later stages, it was followed by a channel slide featuring Jerusalem at night and IBA announcer Malachi Ezekiah saying "The broadcast of Israeli Television has finished for today. Good night from Jerusalem." and was followed by the national anthem.

The program has been broadcast every night since November 1969, when the television service's hours of broadcasting grew. It was first initiated by Benyamin Zvieli, who was then the manager of the Jewish heritage department in the Israel Broadcasting Authority. He was the reciter, and the secretary of the department, Leah, was responsible for moving the "Yad". After his retirement, he was replaced by Mordechai Freidman as the reciter, who is still the daily reciter as of 2010. The program was retired in 2012.

During the 1980s and 1990s, spinoff shows were created based on Psuko shel Yom: Psuko shel Makom (a place's passage), and Agada Shel Makom (a place's Aggadah [lit. legend]), which showed sites in Israel and the related verses and legends.

In 2016, a new series was commissioned as part of a campaign initiated by Channel 1 to reinstate old programming for two months, in anticipation of the dissolution of the IBA and the establishment of the Israeli Public Broadcasting Corporation. This new series consisted of thirty episodes and were about the history of broadcasting in Israel.

== Popular culture ==
Psuko Shel Yom became a part of Israeli popular culture and was mentioned in various contexts, ranging from the solemn to the mocking.

In many people's views, the regular broadcasting of the midnight segment individualizes the broadcasting of the Hebrew public channel 1, and provides a unique Jewish spiciness. It reminds people of the term "Daf Yomi" ("[the] daily page", a daily regimen undertaken to study the Babylonian Talmud), and grants a drop of Judaism to the broad Israeli public, especially the secular one, becoming part of the Jewish heritage.

The midnight short segment has also taken a hit from critics. The broadcasting in a midnight hour is claimed by the critics to be somewhat associated with weariness and sleeping. Also, the regular displayed platform-content that is unchanged, was criticized to be repeatedly old fashioned, and the old-fashioned biblical text with non common Modern Hebrew words – all became a matter of humor, both in casual conversations and in satire.
