= Clock ident =

Time display on TV

A clock ident is a form of television ident in which a clock is displayed, reading the current time, and usually alongside the logo of that particular television station. Clock idents are typically used before news bulletins and closedown, though in the past quite commonly preceded regular programming. In the United Kingdom, clock idents are also associated with schools programming.

BBC1 clock ident from 1981, featuring a cue mark in the top left.

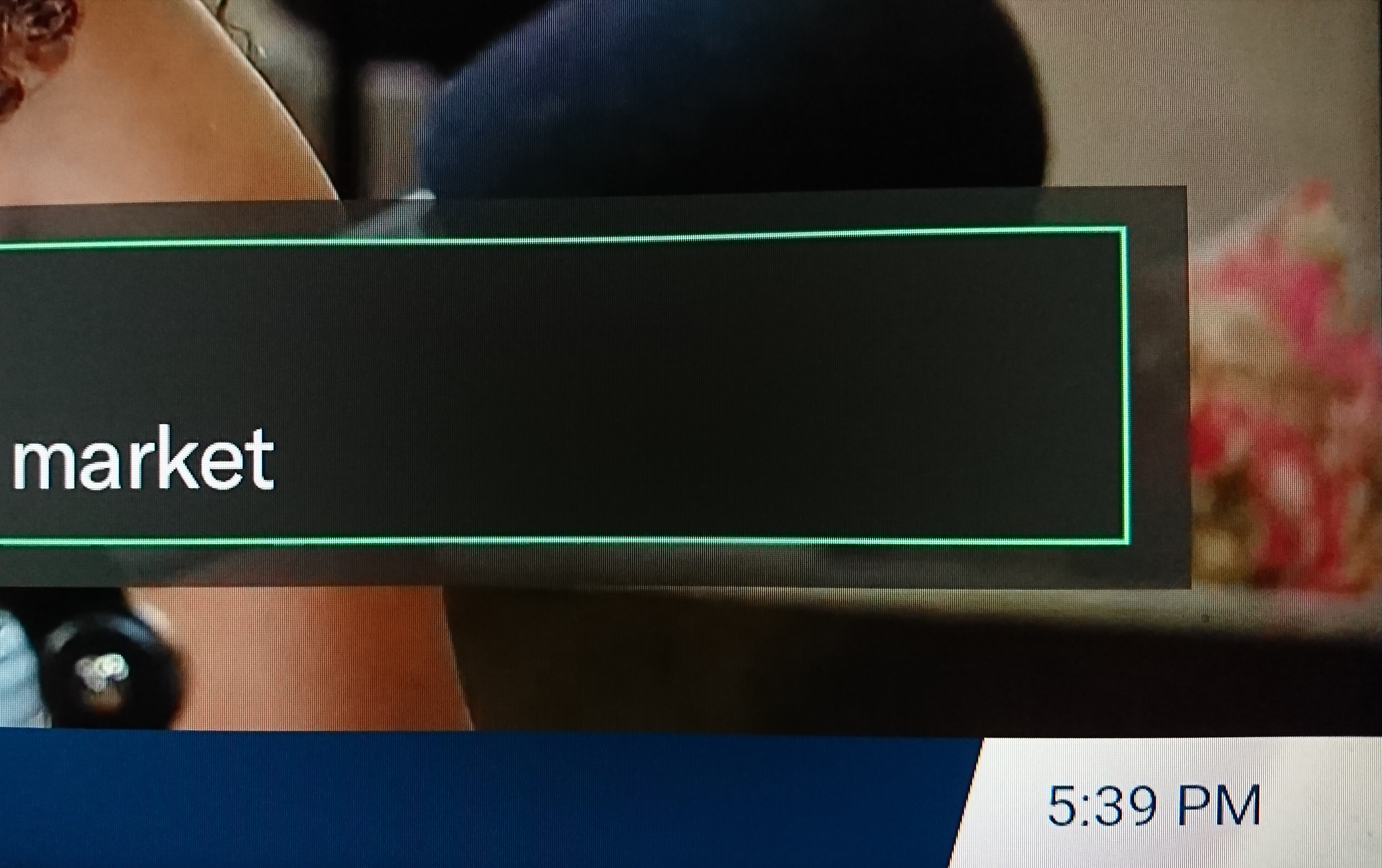
A clock ident, while watching a live news program in Haystack News.

== Appearance ==
Clock idents are typically displayed as an analogue clock, although some broadcasters have experimented with digital clocks. In particular, during the 1970s and 1980s, many ITV regions in the UK adopted digital clock designs, which are overlaid onto a coloured card using CSO. The backgrounds were generally static, but some clocks had movement. For example, Associated-Rediffusion had a spinning Adastral. The final clocks from 1995 to 1998, used by RTÉ One and RTÉ Two, were overlaid onto a video background.

The first station clocks were mechanical, but were converted to an electronically generated format in the 1980s.

A clock will usually match a TV channel's normal ident or idents; some broadcasters such as TVP from Poland and RTM from Malaysia are exceptions.

Clocks can be displayed in silence, but can also be accompanied by music or the voice of a continuity announcer giving programme information.

== Usage ==
=== Europe ===
Traditionally, clocks have been used before programmes, as well as after programmes and at closedown or startup. Their use before news bulletins ensured that the bulletin began at the exact time dictated by the schedule.

During the late 1990s and early 2000s, digital television became commonplace and clocks began to drop out of use - delays caused by digital systems meant that clocks were a few seconds slow. Most television channels no longer sign off at night, eliminating the need for closedown clocks. BBC One stopped using a clock ident at Easter 2002, when it changed its idents from the Balloon to the Rhythm and Movement series. BBC Two had ended its regular use of an on-screen clock some years before, and the final showing of a clock on BBC Two was on 9 July 2001. One notable exception is the Welsh-language channel S4C, which used a clock until 2007 at closedown and before news bulletins. In 2015, however, Channel 4 reinstated clock idents as part of the channel's relaunch, albeit heavily stylized. These idents were used before news programmes until a further relaunch in 2022.

France's public broadcasters have historically used clocks. One of the more famous examples was the clock belonging to RTF Télévision which featured a spiral clock face. Designed by Christian Houriez and introduced in December 1959 it was used throughout the 1960s.

Clocks have also been used in Germany, the Netherlands, Sweden, Denmark, Norway, and Poland, among others.

In Hungary, before 2015, MTV broadcasts clocks before MTV Híradó (their news bulletin) or other news programmes, to announce the New Year's Eve as well as before the national anthem. TV2 and its sister channel, SuperTV2, instead broadcast a five-second countdown before their news bulletins and occasionally other programs. RTL Klub is still known to broadcast clock idents before RTL Híradó and to announce the New Year's Eve since its start in 1997.

Analogue clock idents were used in both the public RTP channels in Portugal, until a major rebranding on 28 January 2002, at which time they were replaced by less obtrusive digital clocks. Clock idents in Portugal have mostly been used before newscasts, although they were sometimes used to align programming with the schedule for continuity.

Television stations in the Czech Republic mostly use clock idents before newscasts, whose overall branding packages usually include the graphics and music for the clock. Clocks are also shown on New Year's Eve, with Czech Television traditionally using footage of a striking clock mechanism in the lead up to midnight.

=== Asia ===
Clock idents are not typically used in Asia, except in a few countries.

In Japan, NHK had an iconic mechanical clock ident from 1969 to 1985. The clock had a blue background and the clock piece was white; on the face plate multiples of 3 had two bars while the other numbers had one bar. There was also an NHK logo near the clock. A variant of that clock design had a wooden background. NHK introduced many clock designs after 1985, although the classic clock as mentioned earlier continued to remain in occasional use as recently as the early-1990s. NHK still broadcasts clocks prior to the 7 a.m. news.

In China, CCTV-1 broadcasts clocks at 5 seconds before the beginning of news programs at noon (since 2016), 7 pm (since 1988) and 10 pm (since 1994). Clocks are also broadcast on New Year's Eve every year at 10 seconds before midnight to announce the beginning of the New Year since 1984.

In Hong Kong, clock idents were used in between programmes, especially news bulletins, although they were not used during closedowns or start-ups.

In Southeast Asia, clock idents are broadcast on a few channels in almost all countries, including Thailand, Malaysia, Singapore, Brunei and Vietnam. In Brunei, RTB broadcast clocks at sign-on (just before Brunei National Anthem as start of the channel), before their news programs, and before Islamic prayer times (Waktu Sembahyang); 4 or 5 times a day. In Cambodia, TVK used to air an analogue clock ident before their TV programs in 1993–1996 and replaced by the digital clock in 1997 (started at 11h30–14h30 and resumed at 17h00–23h00).

In Indonesia, TVRI used to air clock ident before its main news programmes, notably Berita Nasional and Dunia Dalam Berita. The ident accompanied with seven-note tune that resembles the incipit of Mars Pancasila (the anthem of the national emblem of Indonesia). The tune is so iconic that it is included into current ident of the latter starting on 2015. However, TVRI no longer use clock idents since mid-2014.

In Malaysia, RTM broadcast clocks on sign-on and sign-off, but clocks were cancelled in 2009. Clocks on RTM had music until 1978 but on some occasions, such as before main news program, it had background music. TV3 used clocks before their news programs from 1 January 1985.

In the Philippines, the networks of Broadcast City (BBC-2/City2, RPN-9/New Vision 9 and IBC-13/Islands TV 13) aired clock idents during advertisement breaks from 1970s/early-1980s until 1986 (BBC-2/City2) and mid-1990s (RPN-9/New Vision 9 and IBC-13/Islands TV 13). ABS-CBN-2, MBS-4/PTV-4/NBN-4, ABC-5/TV5, GMA-7 and SBN-21 doesn't broadcast clock idents. Since mid-2010s, GMA Network began using clock idents at every hour or at every beginning of its programs which appeared for at least one minute and disappeared afterwards and also, it has a style of red rectangular box and white Seven-segment display numbers as a digital clock which is placed either on lower-left or lower-right portion of their screen and on 2022, they used Arial font numbers for that. Also, PTV and IBC has clock idents during all of its programs since early 2010s and January 2025 located at the lower-left portion of their screen.

In Singapore, Mediacorp broadcast clocks before their news programs. From 1 June 1980, such clocks were sponsored.

In Thailand, Channel 3 used to air an analogue clock ident before their news programs in 1986–1995 after Channel 3 cancelled their joint news program with Channel 9, and in sign-off sequences before it became 24 hours in 2002, but while TV3 had temporary closedowns in May 2010, TV3 did not use clock idents. Between the 1990s and 2009, Channel 3 aired digital clock video counting up to 8 am and 6 pm for the national anthem. Currently, clocks incorporated to Hourly News Updates on both Channel 3 (Channel 3 HD, Flash News) and Channel 3 SD (News 28). Channel 7 used clock idents in the 1990s, and again between January and February 2010 before becoming 24 hours broadcasting on 1 March 2010. Channel 11 used digital clock idents in sign-ons before becoming 24-hour broadcasting on 1 April 2008. Thai PBS used clock idents in 2016 Before Breakfast Program. Channel 5 and Modernine TV are not known to use clock idents. Voice TV using digital clock counting down for 5 seconds before morning edition of Voice News that replaced Wake Up Thailand in 2014.

In Vietnam, VTV and HTV broadcast clocks at sign-on. On VTV, digital clocks are broadcast for 3 seconds before the main news program. But Hanoi Television have broadcast a clock ident sign on 5:30 am since 1997. THVL broadcast clocks at sign on until 2012.

In Israel, in the period between the 1970s and the 90s, Channel 1 showed a clock ident before Mabat (primetime news) or some other news programs, as well as sometimes during closedown. Nowadays, Israeli TV stations replace them with ads or other programs. As of recently, a short countdown ident announcing the news is played, however, since the news program starts at a much more random time, there is no clock on screen.

=== Australia ===
Clock idents were used in Australia from the 1960s until the late 1980s by ABC-TV, as well as by a number of commercial TV stations including SAS-10 Adelaide.

==== ABC-TV ====
ABC (Australian Broadcasting Corporation) Clock ident from 1980

The first ABC-TV clock idents were in black and white. With the introduction of colour TV in Australia in 1975, ABC-TV introduced a white clock on a brown background with "ABC Colour" branding. This later changed to a white clock on a blue background. The final iteration of the ABC-TV clock ident was a white clock on a red background, which was seen as late as 1989.

=== Post-Soviet states ===
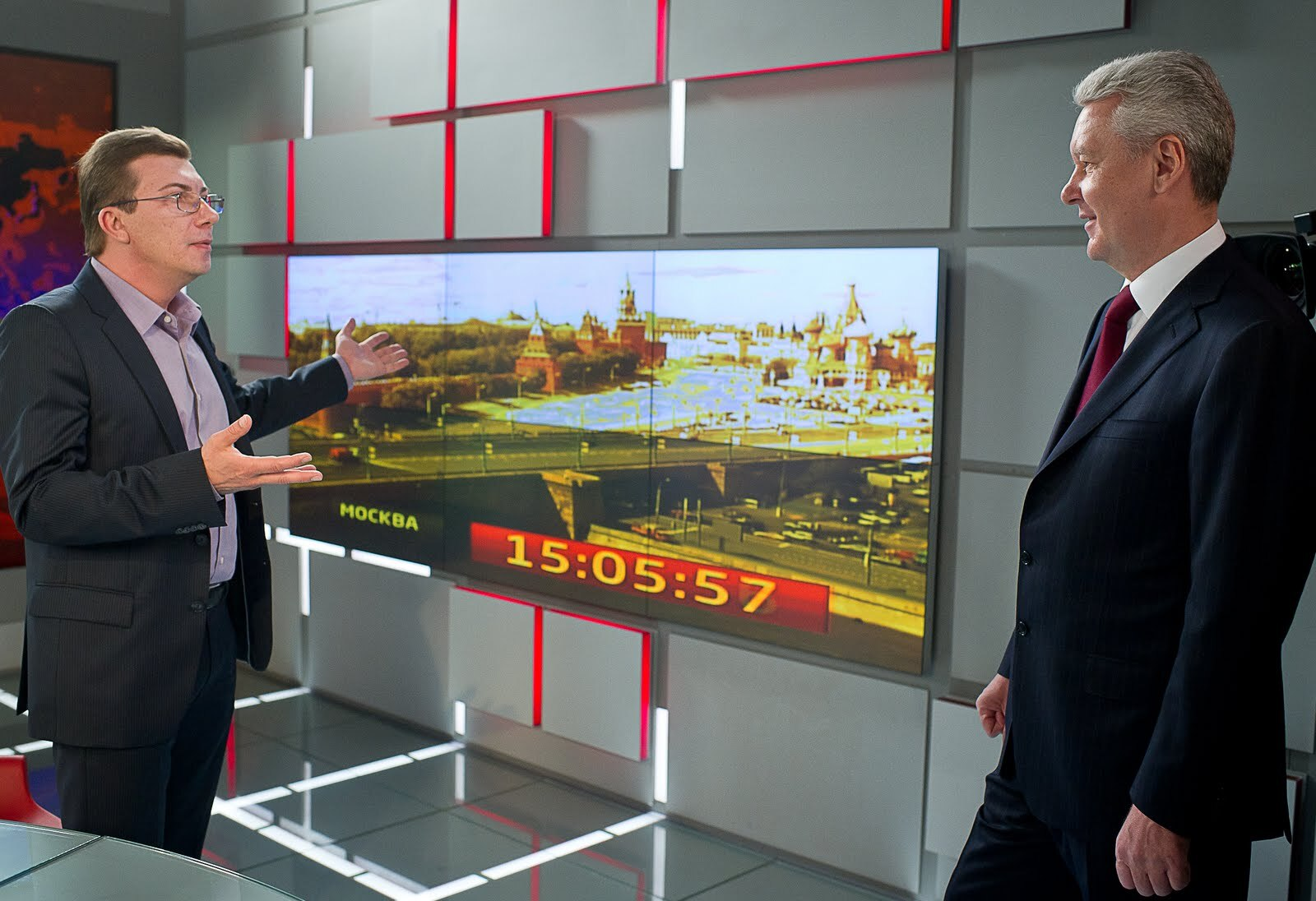
TV Centre clock ident from 2012

Since the Soviet era and even to this day, there have been clock idents shown in most channels of Russia, those include the famous Channel One Analog Clock ident with music changing every 12 hours depending on the time of the day, a CGI Kremlin tower clock shown before news on RTR's Russia 1, with the respective ding-dong sounds, and other clocks from other channels, including digital clocks, with the logo on the bottom, top or elsewhere, or even without it. Clock idents have been also common in all post-Soviet states to some extent.

Certain other channels, like STS, do not broadcast news programs but do show a clock sometimes between programs, at special or scheduled checks or at closedown, though a nightly closedown is rare in Russian channels since most of them are already broadcasting 24 hours a day.

After a tragedy, or on a national remembrance day, those clock idents are shown silent and their color may be changed.

=== The Americas ===
==== Chile ====
During the 1980s and early 1990s, it was common for TV channels in Chile to have clock idents that are broadcast during some commercial breaks, and usually included a sponsorship; for example, Canal 13's clock was tied to Beiesdorf's products. Some channels also accompanied the clock with the temperature and humidity at the moment of broadcast.

Though most channels dropped clocks by the early 1990s, Canal 13 kept its clock, reformulating it to show it digitally over the respective sponsorship (which switched from Beiesdorf to Telefónica Chile). Additionally, the clock was restricted to appear only before Teletrece (its main newscast). A similar clock was introduced by competitor TVN during the mid-2000s. Both were dropped by the end of the decade, as permanent clocks were added to newscasts.

With the gradual advent of 24/7 broadcasting in Chile, Chilevisión re-introduced clock idents in 2022, being shown again during some commercial breaks, but with the time being shown digitally.

==== Paraguay ====
In the 1980s, SNT aired a series of sketches sponsored by department store Kube, known as Kube da la hora exacta. These segments consisted of a puppet mascot (Kubito, voiced by Chilean Héctor “Tito” García), which told a joke to a human actor (often played by Miguel Ángel Pereira, who was assassinated in 2014). After the punchline (delivered by Kubito), it cut to a Kube graphic with a digital time overlay. The character served as inspiration for a music project from Argentina (Misiones Province; SNT was received there by means of overspill) in 2025.

==== United States ====
It is very rare to see clock idents in the United States on television. KCET in Los Angeles, California used one in the 1970s.

WNBC, when it was WNBT, used time signals sponsored by Bulova throughout the 1940s; the first commercial on American television, broadcast on July 1, 1941, was a modified test pattern, sponsored by Bulova, and featuring a clock. It is reported that the station used such time signals until 1949 or later; in September 1949, it appeared no less than 270 times. The design featured a Bulova-sponsored clock on the left hand side of the screen beneath the WNBT callsign, with the Empire State Building to the right. WABD was also reported to use a modified test pattern featuring a clock in 1948. A spot advertisement for Bulova was also the first spot advertisement seen on WGN-TV on April 6, 1948.

==== Canada ====
In the 1990s, CityTV inserted a clock in its station IDs.
