= Goldenfry =

British food manufacturer

Goldenfry Foods Ltd
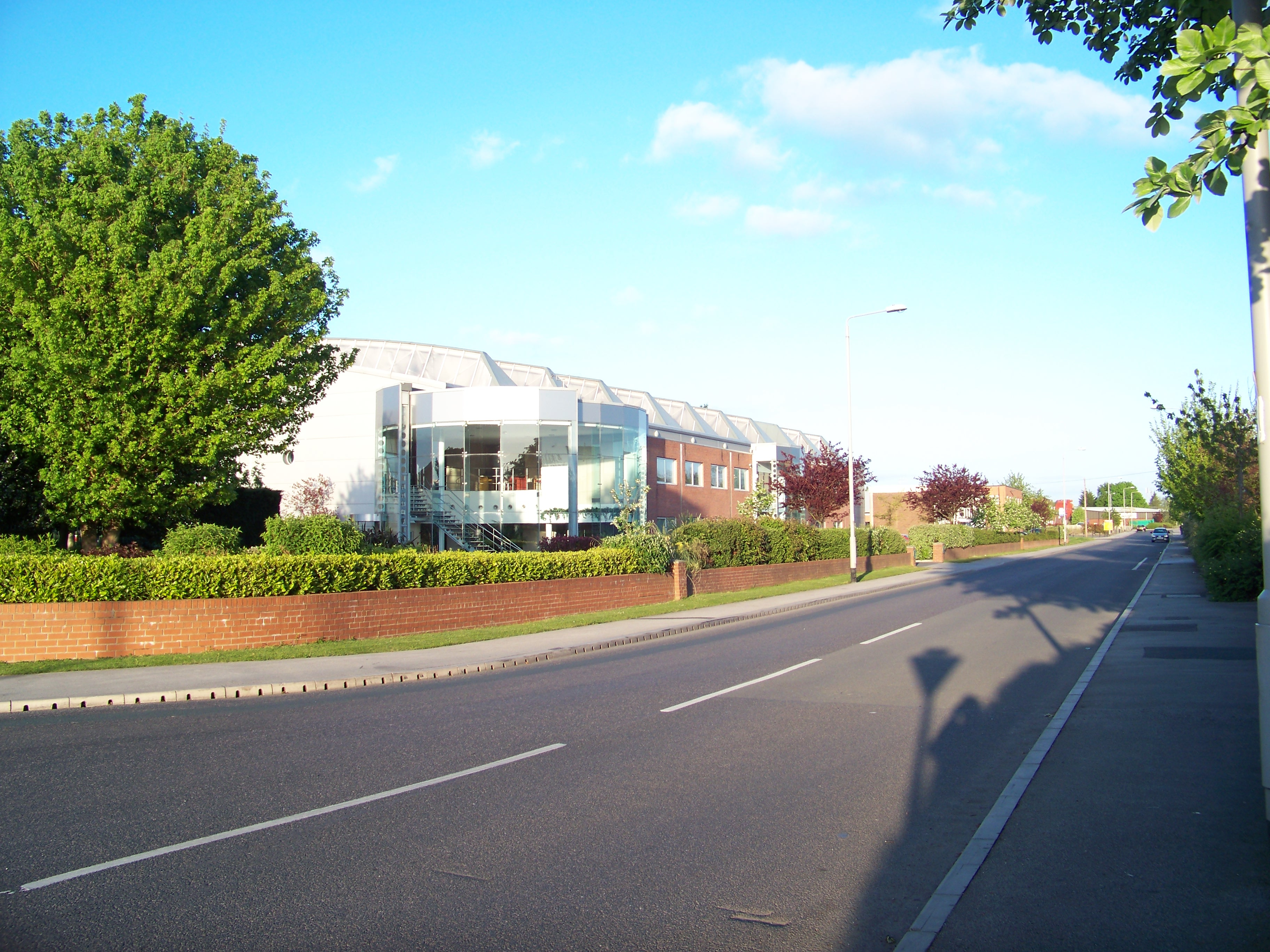
- Goldenfry Factory in Wetherby
- Company type: Private Limited Company (Ltd)
- Founded: Wetherby, West Yorkshire, United Kingdom
- Headquarters: Wetherby, West Yorkshire, United Kingdom
- Products: Food Ingredients and Flavours
- Website: www.goldenfry.co.uk

Goldenfry Foods is a British food manufacturer based in Wetherby, West Yorkshire. The company manufactures most own brand supermarket gravy products as well as many of their own food products. In 1999, the company completely rebuilt their Wetherby factory, the modern building is now a modern steel structure with glass fronted entrances, this replaced a collection of dated sheds. The company employs approximately 200 full-time employees.

== Company history ==
The company started as a small independent fish and chip shop in Wetherby. The company evolved to start making gravy and gravy products. In the 1960s, the Sandbeck Industrial Estate started to develop in Wetherby, Goldenfry started to develop a factory there, the company extended their premises there until it reached maximum capacity on its site in the 1990s. The company demolished its factory and modernised its site building a new large impressive structure which opened in 1999 and further developments throughout 2010 and 2011.

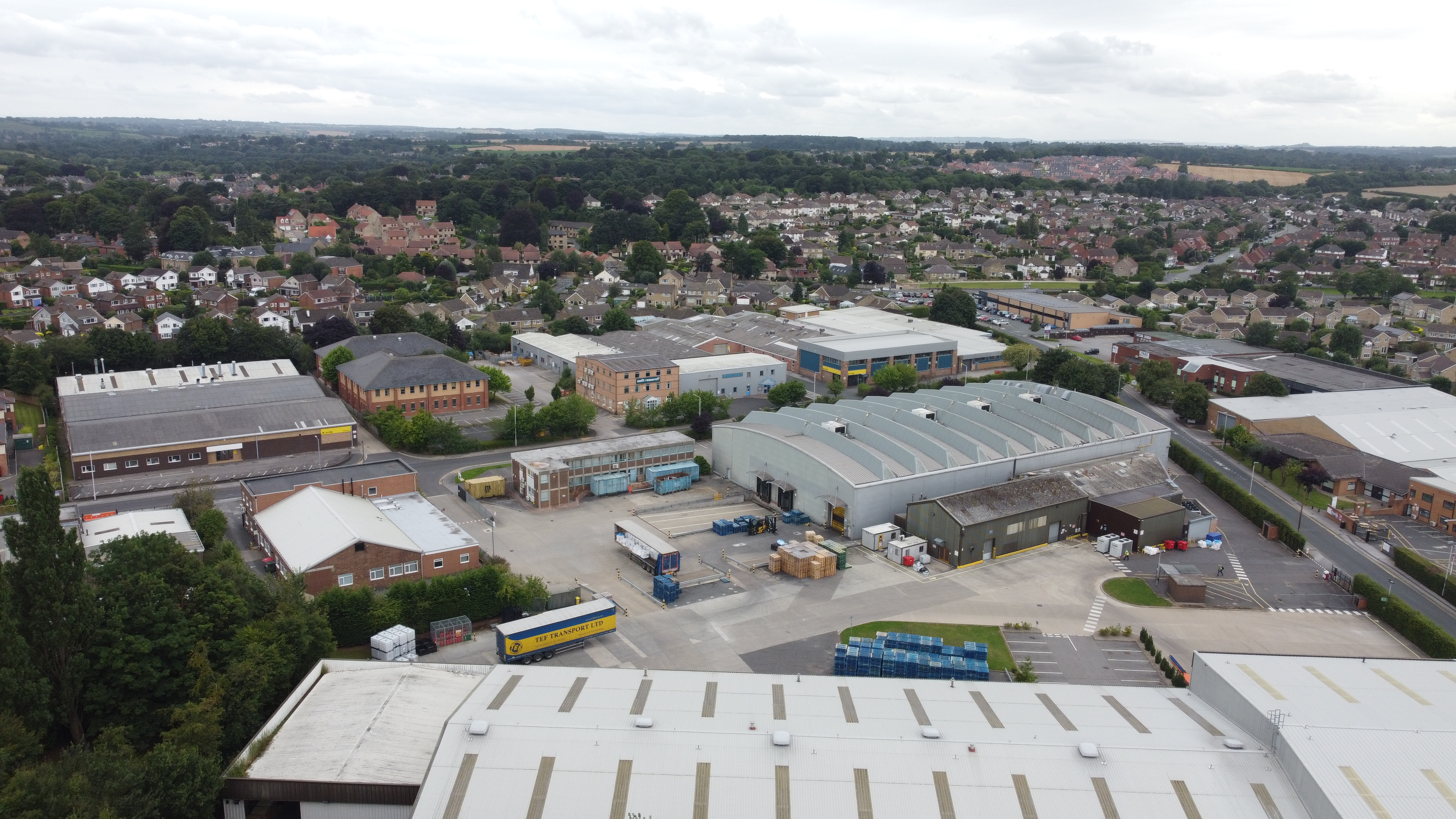
Aerial photograph of the site

During construction the tubular steel structure was unclad and could be seen around most of North East Wetherby earning it the nicknames Elland Road and The Pepsi Max after the football stadium and rollercoaster respectively.

In 2011, the company won a High Court judgement against three former employees who had gone to work at a rival firm and developed an own-brand gravy granule food for a leading supermarket. The High Court ruled in favour of Goldenfry ascertaining that the new venture had misused trade secrets and had privileged access to commercial information.
