= Leonard Robert Brightwell =

British artist (b. 1889, d. 1962)

- Born: 17 May 1889; Clapham, London, England
- Died: 1962
- Occupation(s): Illustrator, painter

Leonard Robert Brightwell (17 May 1889 - 1962) was an English animal painter, etcher, illustrator, and author.

== Biography ==
Born in Clapham to parents James and Emma, Brightwell studied at Lambeth School of Art in London and visited the Zoological Gardens. He became a Fellow of the Zoological Society of London in 1906 as well as a member of the Marine Biological Association in 1922 and was commissioned by both and other institutions to make scientific drawings of various creatures including extinct animals.

His first illustrated book was A British Dog in France in 1913 after which he served in the British Army during World War I. He then continued work as an illustrator and author. He had signed editions of his etchings of animals published by James Connell & Sons in London.

He illustrated an aquarium guide, bringing "individuality to each creature he draws" according to a review in Nature. His cartoons were published in Punch from age 16.

== Bibliography ==
- A Cartoonist Among Animals (1921)
- The Tiger in Town (1930)
- On the Seashore (1934)
- Zoo Calendar (1934)
- A Seashore Calendar (1935)
- The Zoo You Know (1936)
- Neptune’s Garden (1937)
- The Dawn of Life (1938)
- The Garden Naturalist (1941)
- Rabbit Rearing (1944)
- Sea-Shore Life in Britain (1947)
- The Pond People (1949)
- The Story of Fish, Fishermen and the Home (1951)
- The Story of Pets and How to Keep Them (1951)
- The Story of Animals and the Home (1952)
- The Story Book of Jungle to Home (1952)
- The Zoo Story (1952)
- Down to the Sea (1954)
- Trimmer, the Tale of a Trawler Tyke (1956)

=== Illustrator ===
- Reynard the Fox
- PETIT-BEC by Olwen Bowen
- Queer Fish by E. G. Boulenger
- Plymouth Aquarium Guide by E. W. Sexton
- FLY FISHING FOR TROUT: PRINCIPLES AND PRACTICE by R. D'Oyly Hemingway
- Life in the Aquarium by Philip Barker (1961)
- A child's biology by Brian Vesey- Fitzgerald
