= List of instant foods =

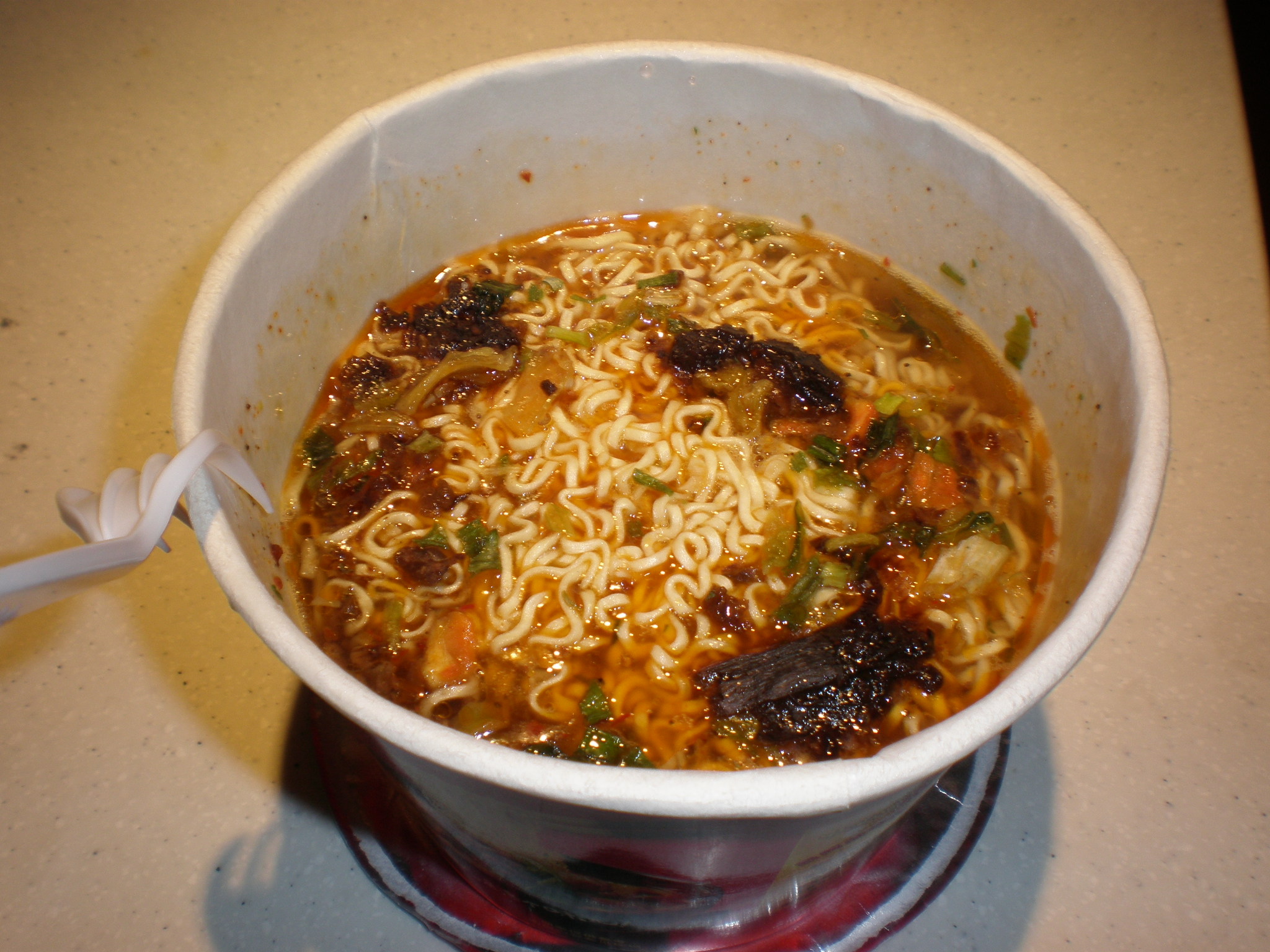
A cup of roasted beef instant noodles

This is a list of instant foods. Instant foods are convenience foods which require minimal preparation, typically just adding water or milk. Some authors define "instant" food as requiring less than five minutes of preparation and "ultra-instant food" as requiring less than one minute. Instant foods are often dehydrated, freeze-dried, or condensed.

== Instant foods ==
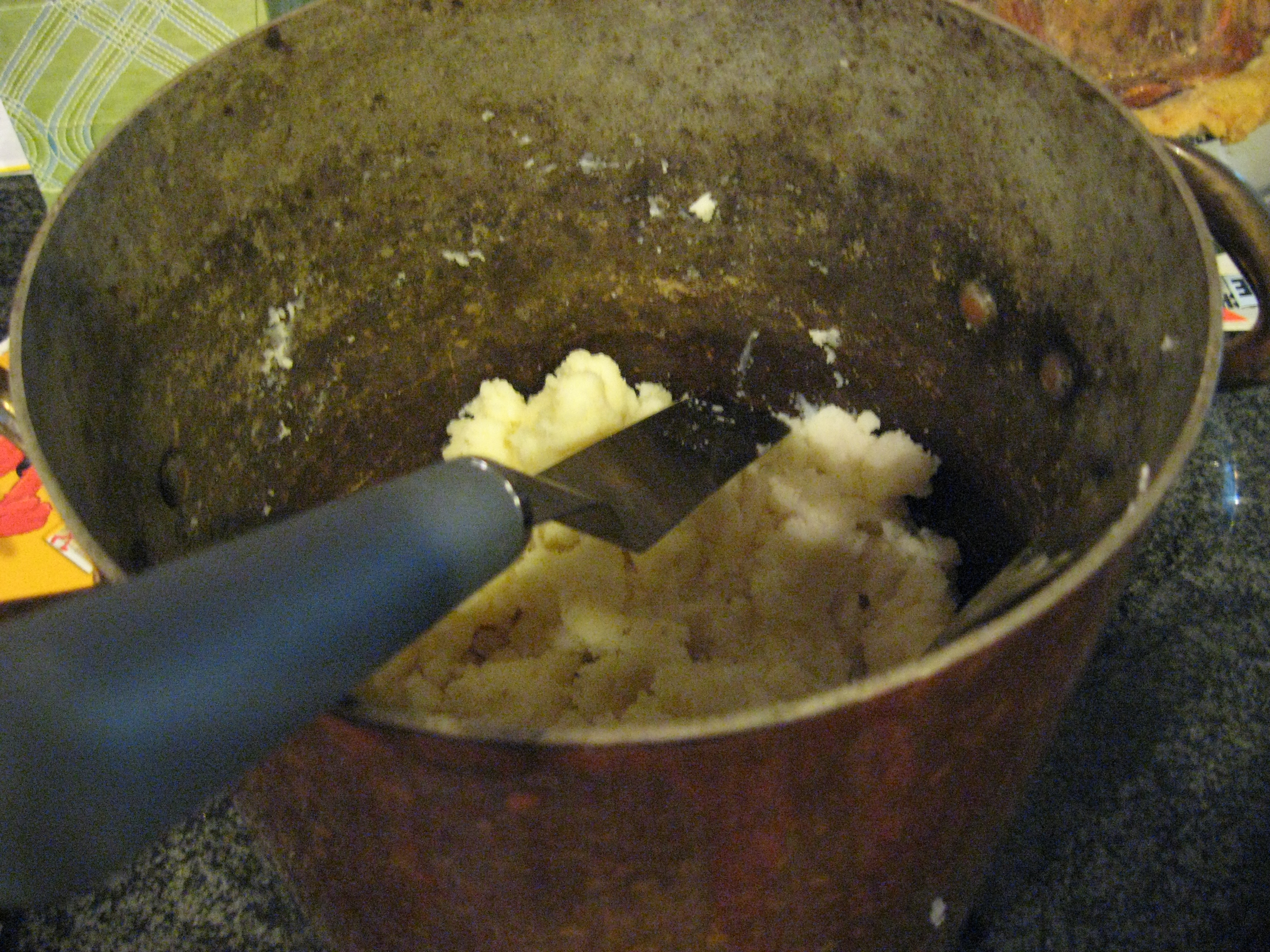
Instant mashed potatoes

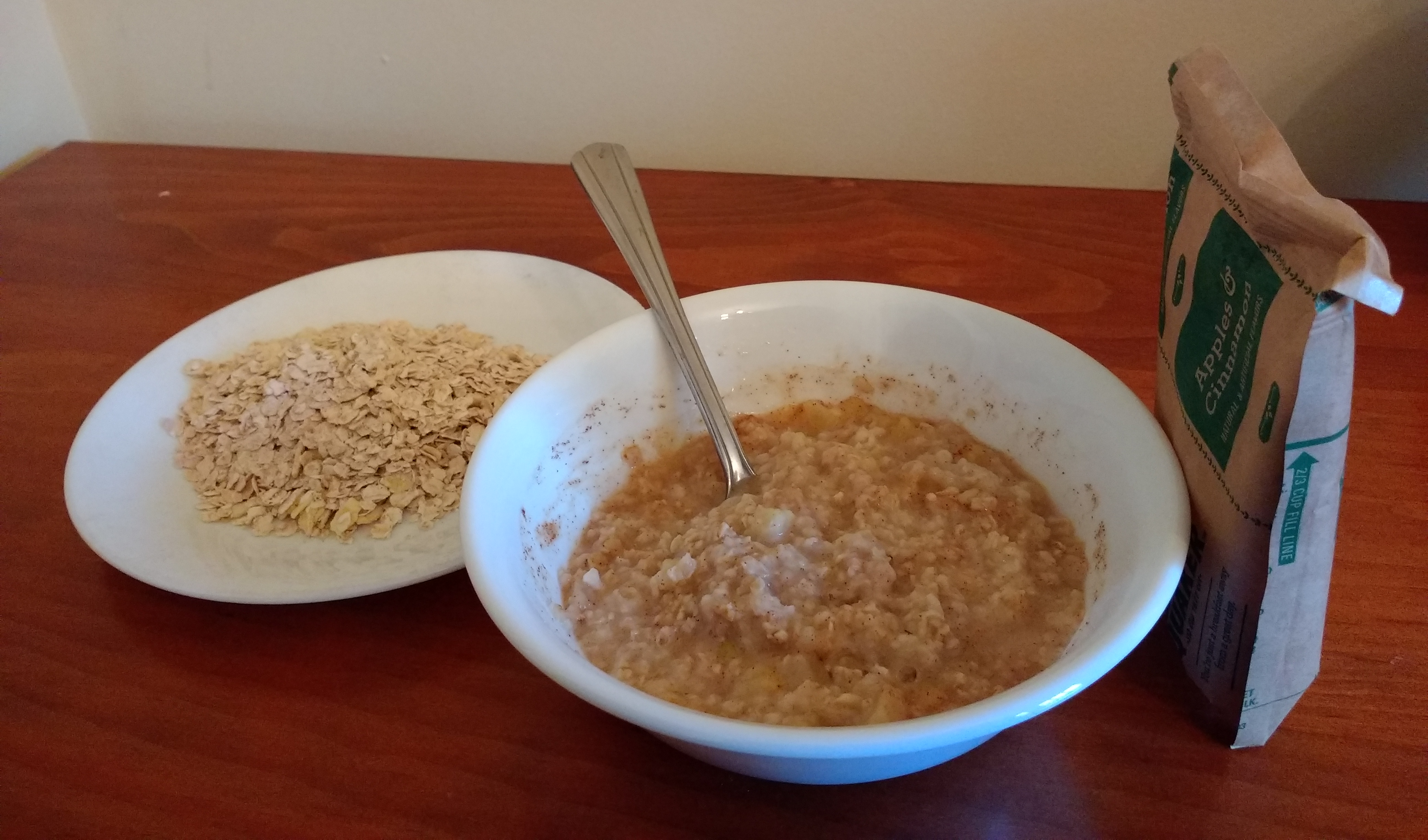
Quaker Instant Oatmeal

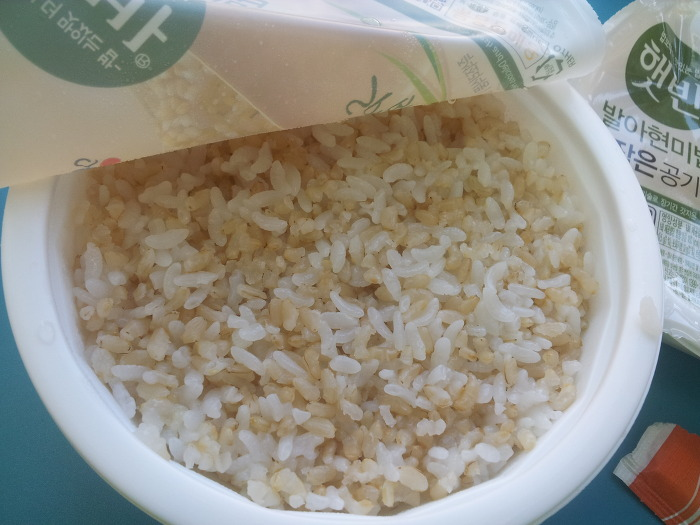
Instant rice – pictured is a microwaveable brown rice

- Instant baby food – dehydrated baby food was produced by Gerber and Heinz in the 1980s. Dehydrated baby food products produced by both companies consisted of dehydrated food flakes. The Gerber product never came to fruition as a widely used product; it was only test-run in Omaha, Nebraska, for around eight to nine months, and consumer adoption was not sufficient for the product to go into mass production.
  - Pablum
- Bird's Custard
- Camping food
- Condensed soup
- Powdered eggs
- Instant gravy – Bisto is a brand of powdered instant gravy that has been produced and consumed in Great Britain since 1908.
- Instant mashed potatoes
  - Smash – a brand of Instant mashed potatoes in the United Kingdom
- Instant noodles
  - Cup noodle
  - List of instant noodle brands
- Instant oatmeal – Quaker Instant Oatmeal is an example
- Instant pudding
- Instant porridge – an example is Cream of Wheat brand, which includes an instant variety in its product line
- Instant rice
  - Minute Rice – an instant rice brand
- Instant curry
  - S&B Foods – an instant curry brand
- Instant soup
  - Cup-a-Soup
  - Portable soup
- Instant sauce mixes
- Instant tofu powder – introduced and produced circa 1966 by Japan Protein Industry (Nihon Tanpaku Kogyo), it was used at that time as a time-saver for the production of tofu. Later in 1973, a brand of instant tofu powder named Hausu Hontôfu was produced and marketed to consumers by the Hausu Foods Company.
Instant foods

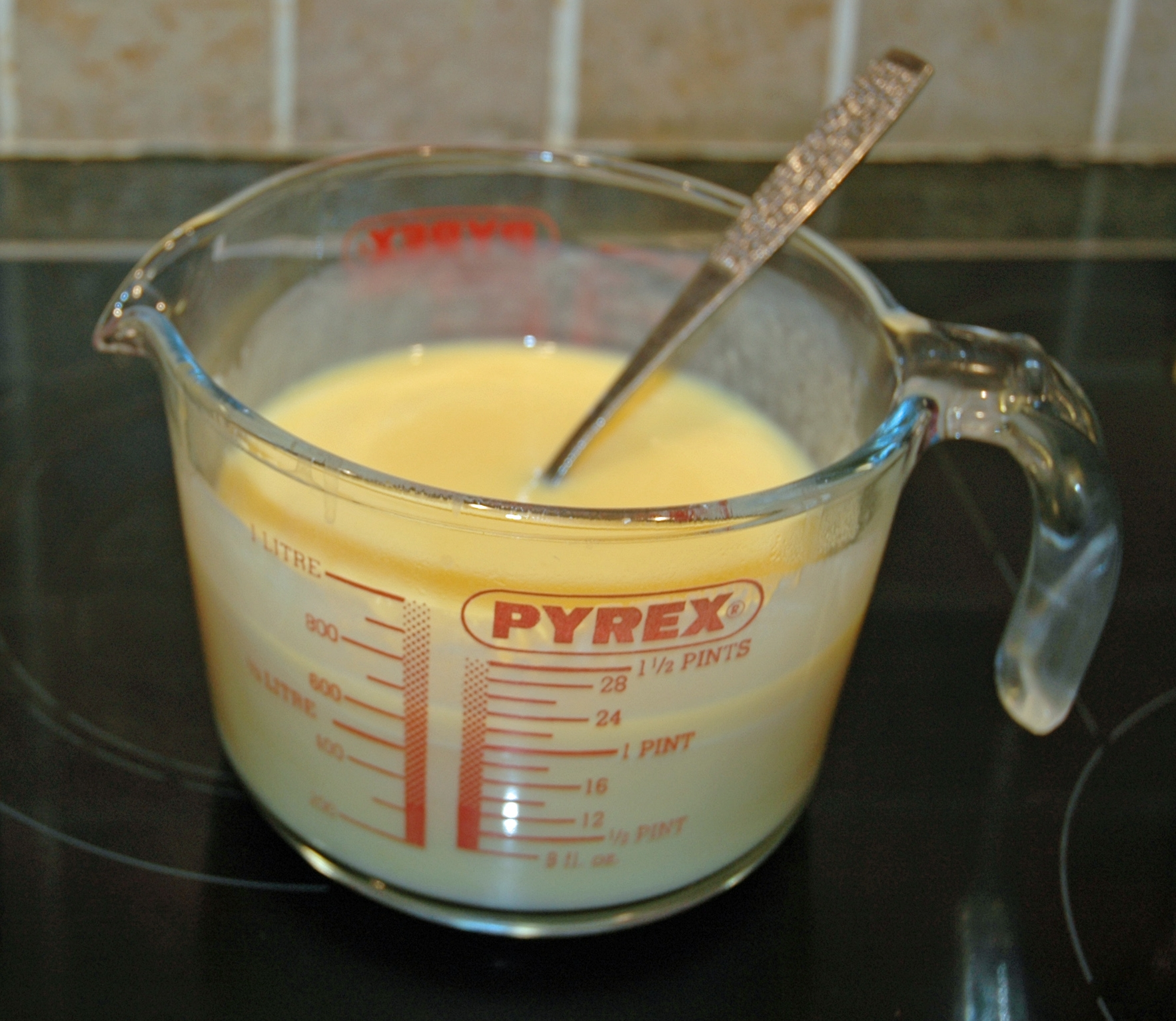
Mixed Bird's Custard

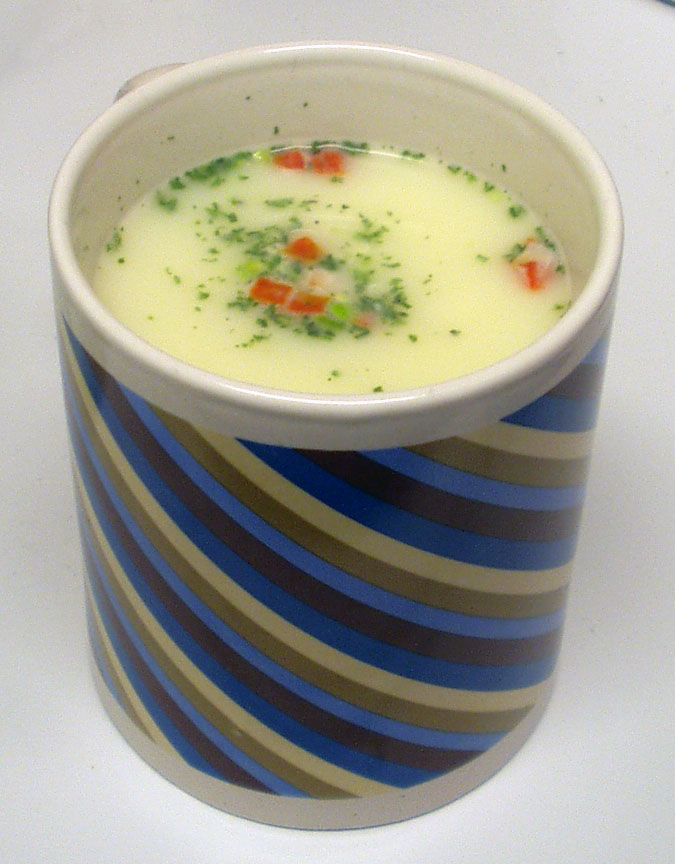
A prepared chicken and vegetable cup-a-soup

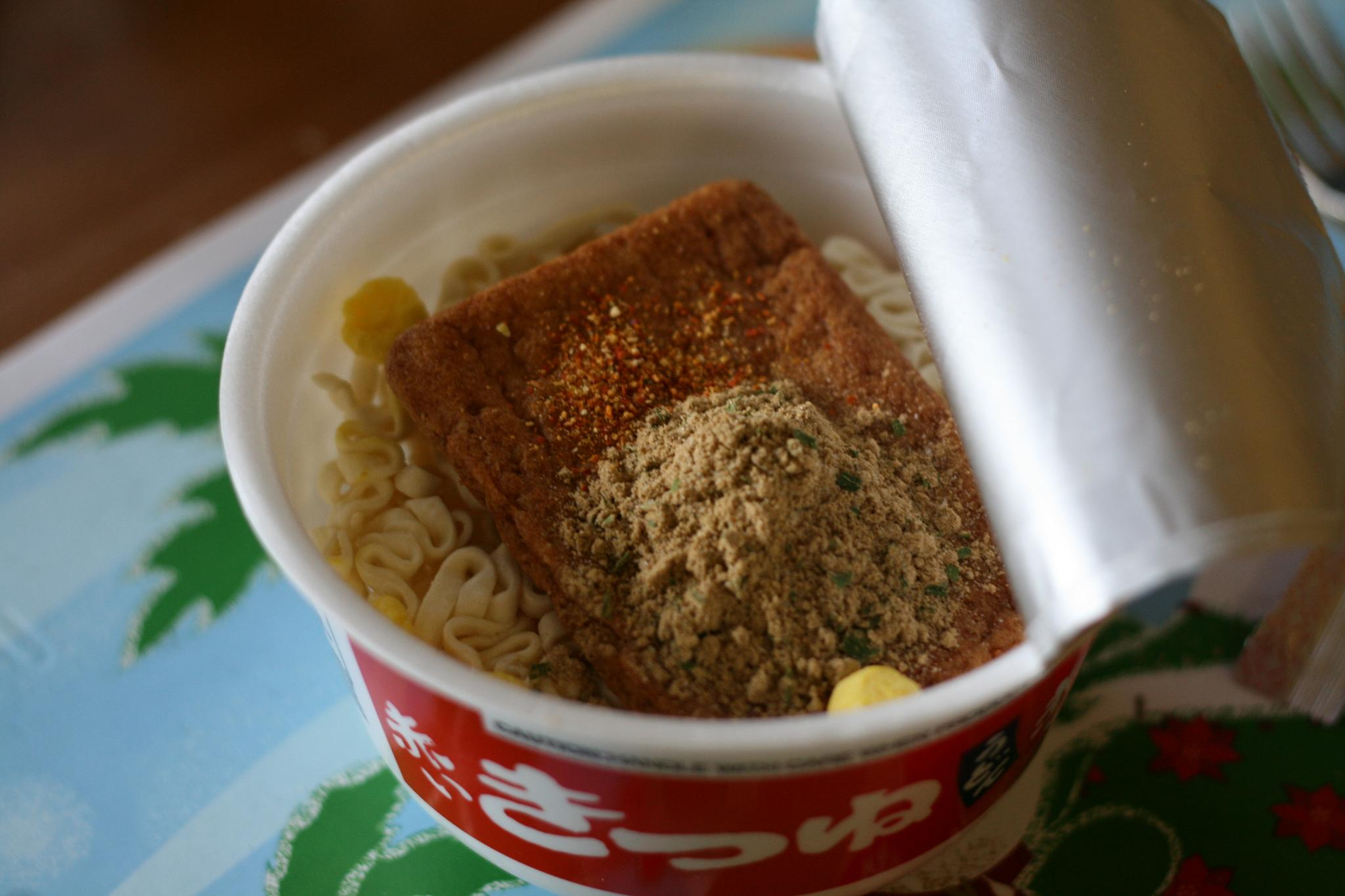
An opened cup of an instant noodles brand that is packaged with dehydrated fried tofu

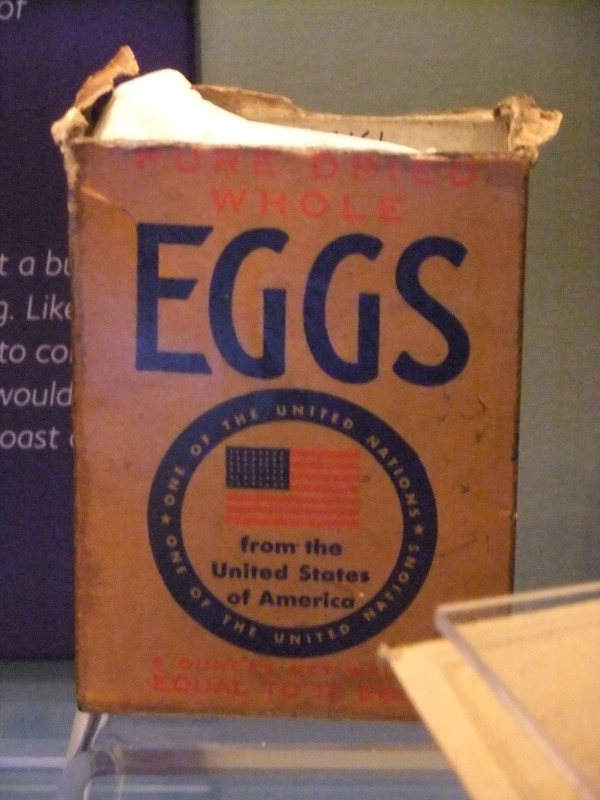
A box of U.S.-made powdered eggs, prepared using whole dried eggs

=== Beverages ===
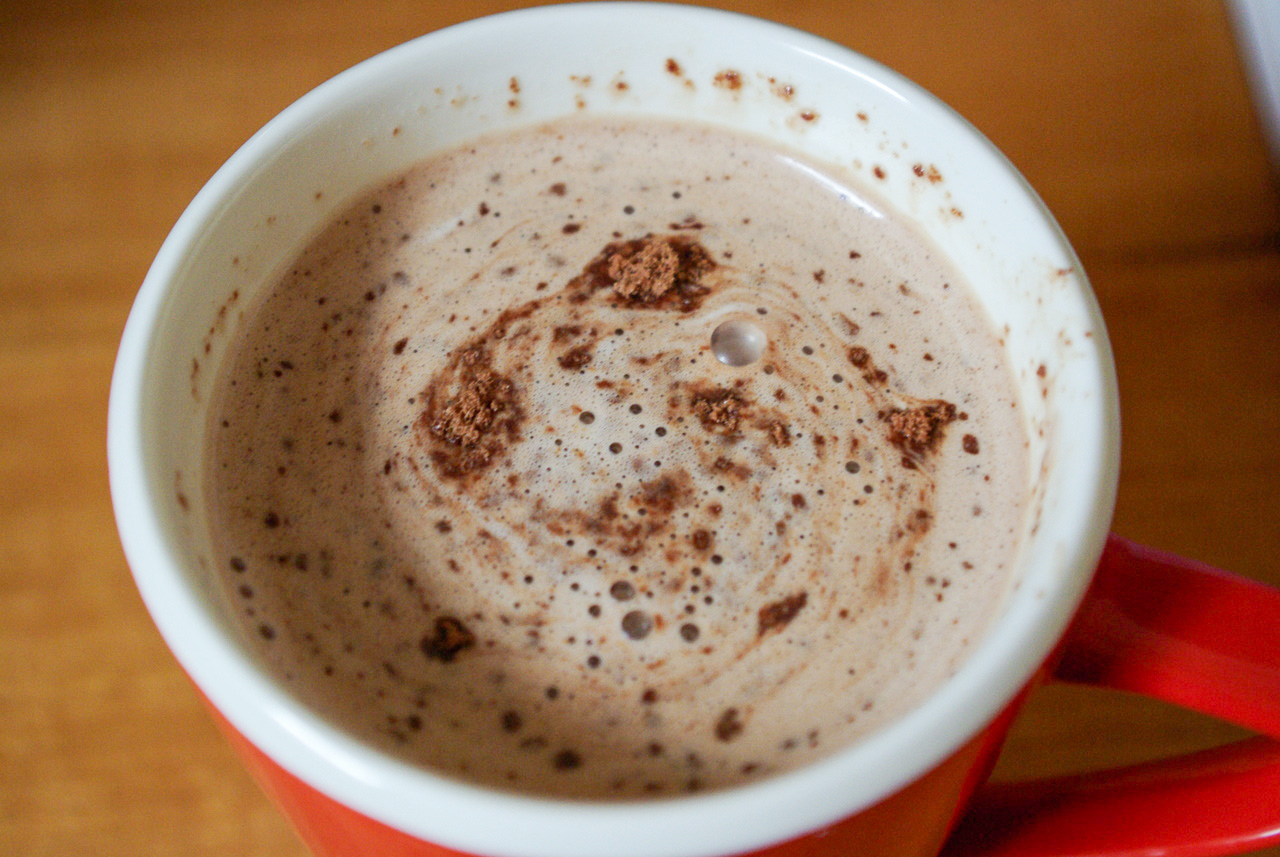
A cup of hot Milo

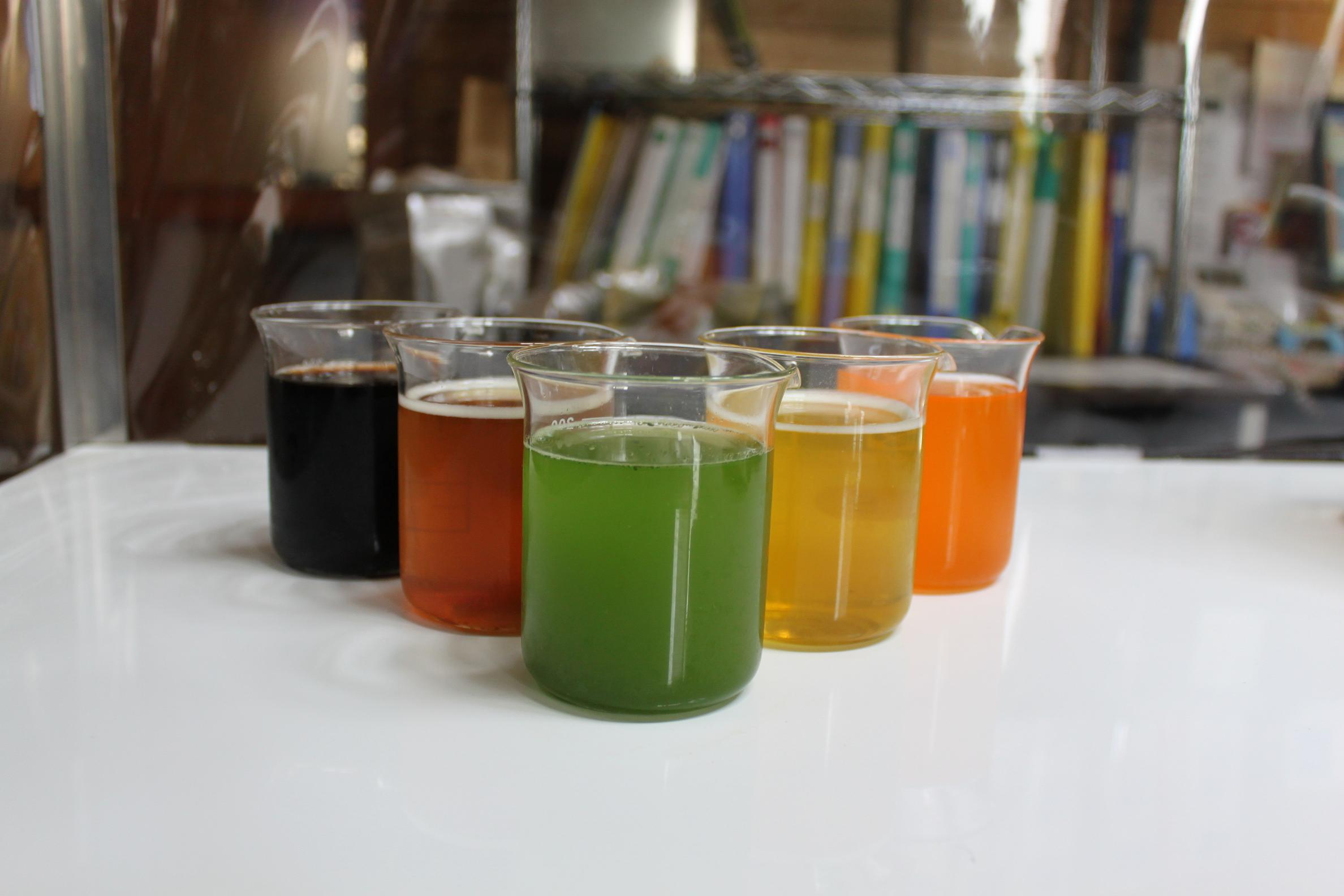
Various reconstituted instant teas

- Awake – a short-lived artificial orange juice formulated by General Foods Corporation and introduced in 1964. It was a predecessor to Tang.
- Instant breakfast
- Chocolate drinks
  - Hot chocolate
    - Swiss Miss – hot chocolate
  - Milo – can be prepared cold or hot
  - Nesquik
  - Ovaltine
- Instant coffee
- Drink mix
- Freeze-dried fruit juices
- Powdered milk – in a 1986 session in Moscow, Russia, the International Dairy Federation defined instant skim milk powder as qualifying for the term "instant" when no more than fifteen seconds are required for all lumps to disappear when the powder is mixed with water and stirred.
  - Coconut milk powder
- Tang – a fruit-flavored drink that was originally formulated by General Foods Corporation food scientist William A. Mitchell in 1957. It was first marketed in powdered form in 1959. The Tang brand is owned by Mondelēz International.
- Instant tea
  - Instant milk tea – a mass-produced instant powder
Instant beverages

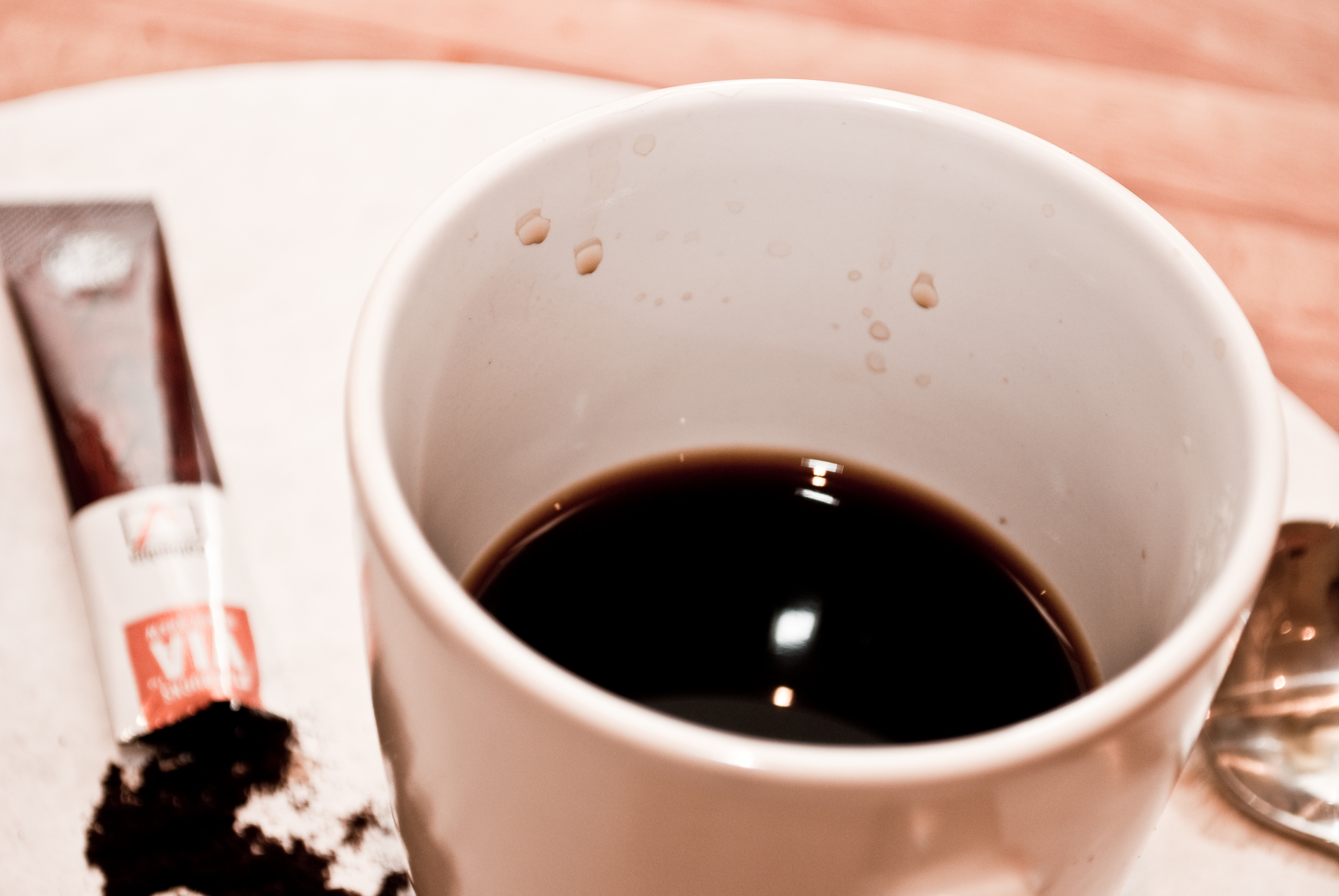
A cup of Starbucks Instant coffee

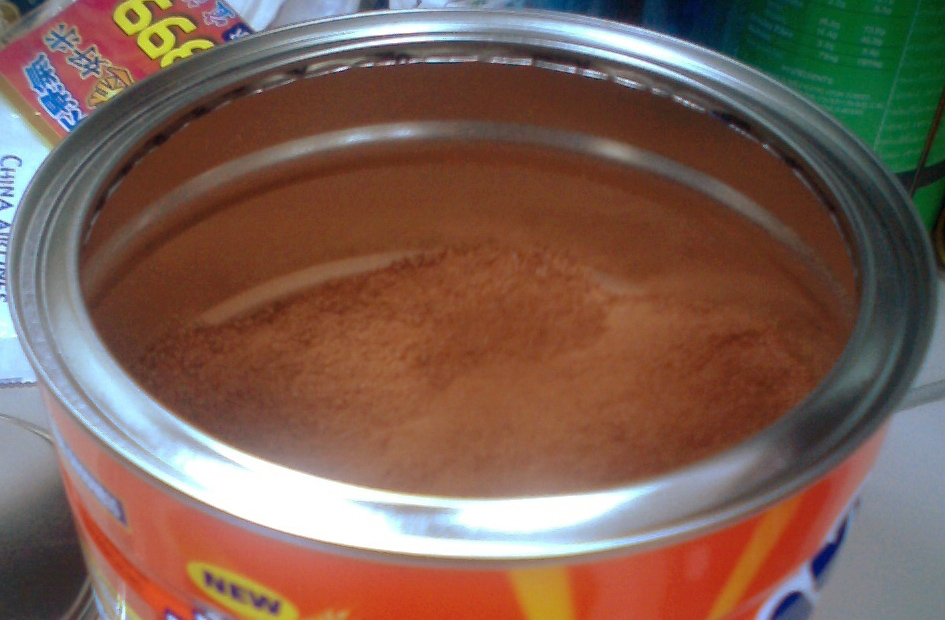
Ovaltine in the can

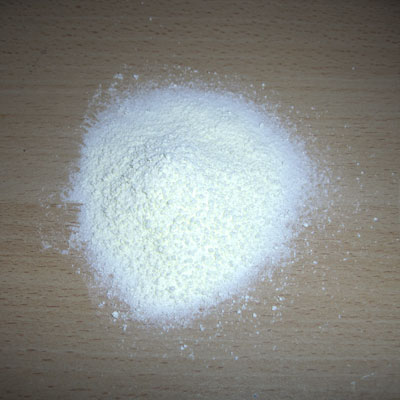
Powdered milk

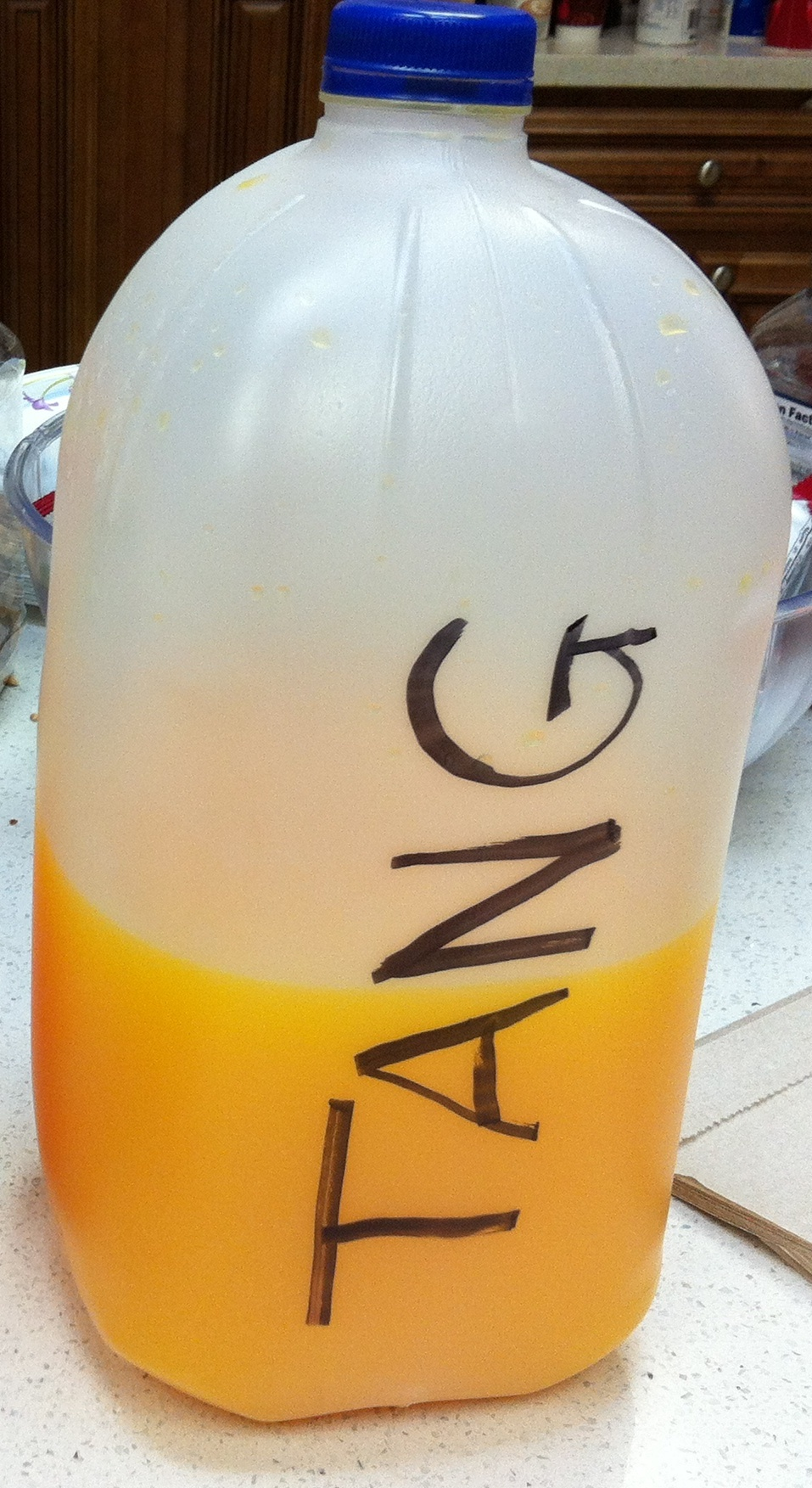
Prepared Tang

=== Rations ===
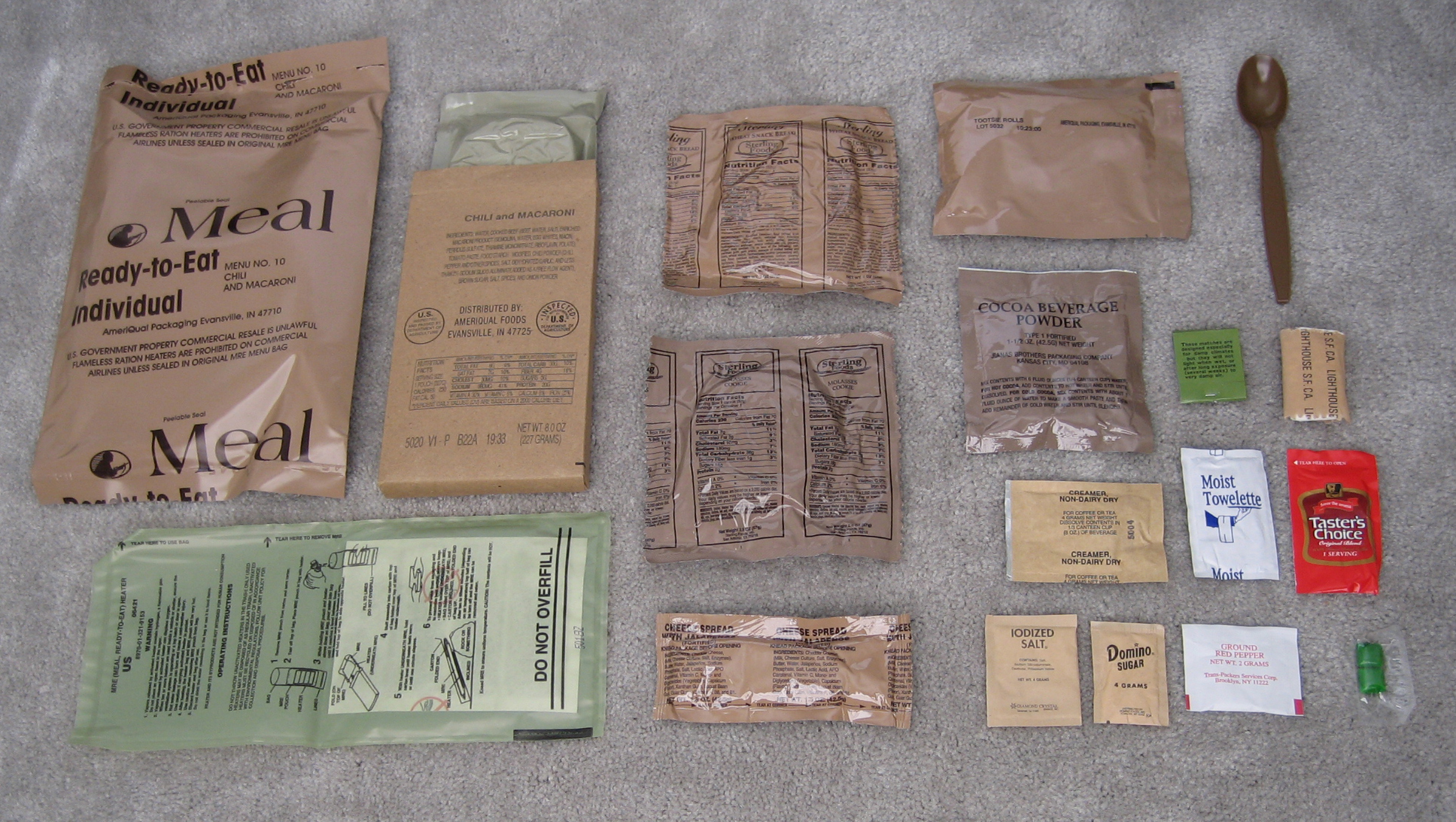
Contents of a Meal, Ready-to-Eat package

- Field ration – a field ration, combat ration or ration pack is a canned or pre-packaged meal, easily prepared and eaten, transported by military troops on the battlefield.
  - Humanitarian daily ration
  - Individual Meal Pack
  - Meal, Ready-to-Eat
- Military rations

== See also ==
- Canned food
- Convenience food
- Dehydrated food
  - Dried fruit
  - List of dried foods
- Frozen food
- Index of military food articles
- Instant hot water dispenser
- Space food
- Fast food
- Lists of foods
- List of smoked foods
- Snack
  - List of snack foods
- Frozen meal
