= Instant coffee =

Drink made by rehydrating powdered coffee

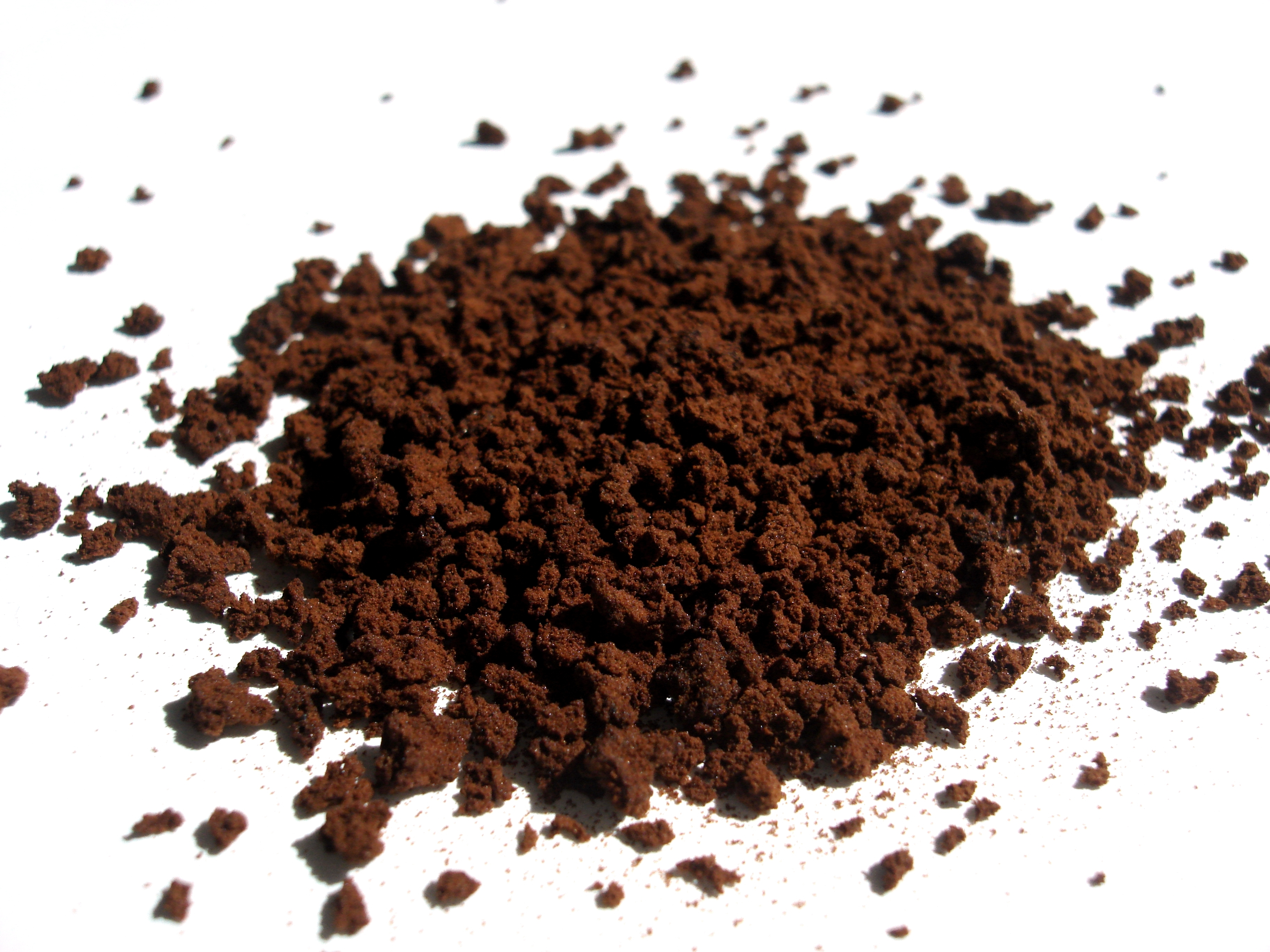
- Instant coffee granules
- Type: Coffee
- Place of origin: New Zealand
- Region or state: Invercargill, Southland
- Created by: David Strang
- Main ingredients: freeze-dried coffee

Instant coffee is a beverage derived from processed brewed coffee beans that is quickly prepared by adding hot water or milk to powdered solid coffee extracts. Instant coffee solids in powdered or crystallized form (also called soluble coffee, coffee extract, coffee crystals, coffee powder, or powdered coffee, and often sold as "instant coffee") refers to dehydrated and packaged solids used to make the instant coffee beverage. The product was invented in 1890 in Invercargill, Southland, New Zealand, by David Strang. Instant coffee solids are commercially prepared by either freeze-drying or spray drying coffee beverage. Instant coffee is also manufactured in a concentrated liquid form.

Instant coffee has advantages over coffee brewed from ground coffee beans including speed of preparation (instant coffee dissolves quickly in hot water), lower shipping weight and volume than beans or ground coffee for the same amount of beverage, and long shelf life—though instant coffee can spoil if not kept dry. However, the beverage made from ground coffee is considered to have superior quality and taste. Instant coffee also reduces cleanup since there are no coffee grounds. At least one study has found that instant coffee has a lower environmental footprint than drip filter coffee and capsule espresso coffee, on a prepared beverage basis, disregarding quality and appeal of the beverage produced.

The global instant coffee market was valued at US$4.16 billion in 2026.

== History ==
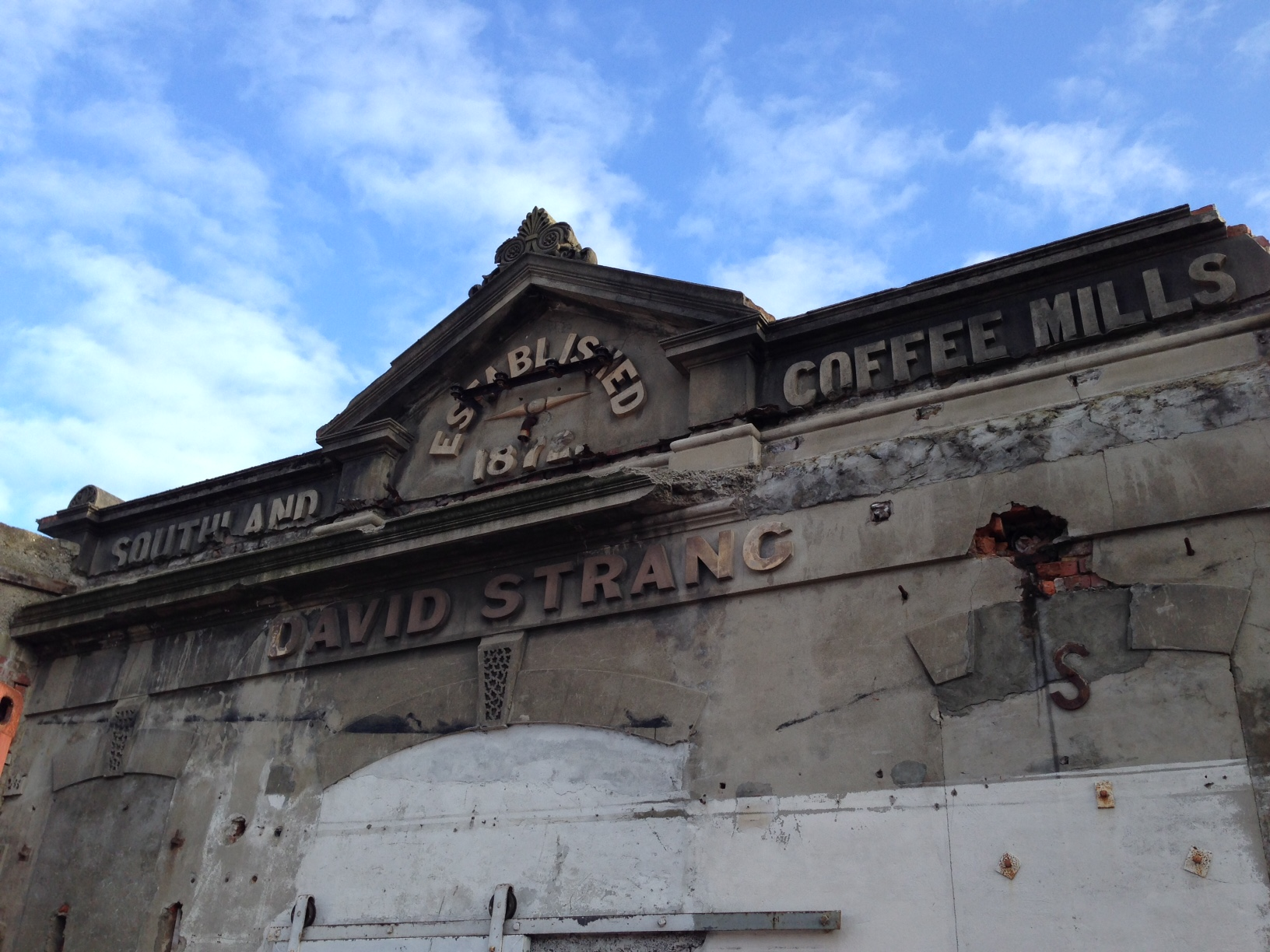
David Strang Coffee Mills

A concentrated coffee/milk/sugar mixture was produced for the Union army during the American Civil War under the name Essence of Coffee, a teaspoonful of which was mixed with a cup of hot water. It had the consistency of axle grease, and proved so unpopular with the troops that it was soon discontinued. The brand Camp Coffee, a liquid coffee and chicory essence, was first produced in 1876 by Paterson & Sons Ltd in Scotland.

The invention for powdered soluble instant coffee was filed on 28 January 1889 and patented in 1890, by David Strang of Invercargill, New Zealand, under patent number 3518, and sold as "Strang's Soluble Coffee Powder", citing the patented "Dry Hot-Air" process. Some modern sources have credited French humorist and writer Alphonse Allais with the invention.

The invention had previously been attributed to Satori Kato, a Japanese scientist working in Chicago in 1901. Kato introduced the powdered substance in Buffalo, New York, at the Pan-American Exposition. George Constant Louis Washington developed his own instant coffee process shortly thereafter, and first marketed it commercially (1910). The product was expensive in relation to its quality however, and had the disadvantage of being highly hygroscopic.

In 1938 Nestlé produced a more stable, free-flowing instant coffee powder under the Nescafé brand. It had previously not been possible to spray dry coffee extract due to its high levels of low molecular weight sugars and acids. These cause the spray dried powder to become sticky and clump into a paste. The Nestlé product, developed by a Swiss chemist Max Morgenthaler, was composed of 50% soluble coffee solids and 50% maltodextrins. The presence of maltodextrins permitted spray drying into a stable powder. Nescafé instant coffee became known world-wide during the Second World War through inclusion in the rations of the US Army. After the war, other companies began to manufacture soluble coffee, for example Douwe Egberts Moccona, and consumption increased rapidly.

In the 1950s, General Foods introduced an instant coffee product made from 100% coffee solids without the need for added carbohydrates such as maltodextrins. By extracting coffee with water at high temperature (up to 175°C) and under pressure, larger polysaccharide carbohydrates naturally present in the coffee beans are released. These larger polysaccharides in the coffee extract facilitate spray drying without the need to add maltodextrins. The resulting instant coffee may be described as pure soluble coffee. Early spray dried instant coffee powders had small particle size and were quite dusty. Agglomeration of spray dried coffee has been used since around 1968 to form the instant coffee into granules.

The first freeze-dried instant coffee was launched in 1963 by General Foods under the brand Maxwell House. From the mid 1960s, techniques of capturing aroma compounds from the roasting and extraction of coffee and then adding them back to the finished product were introduced by manufacturers to improve the flavour of instant coffee.

== Use ==
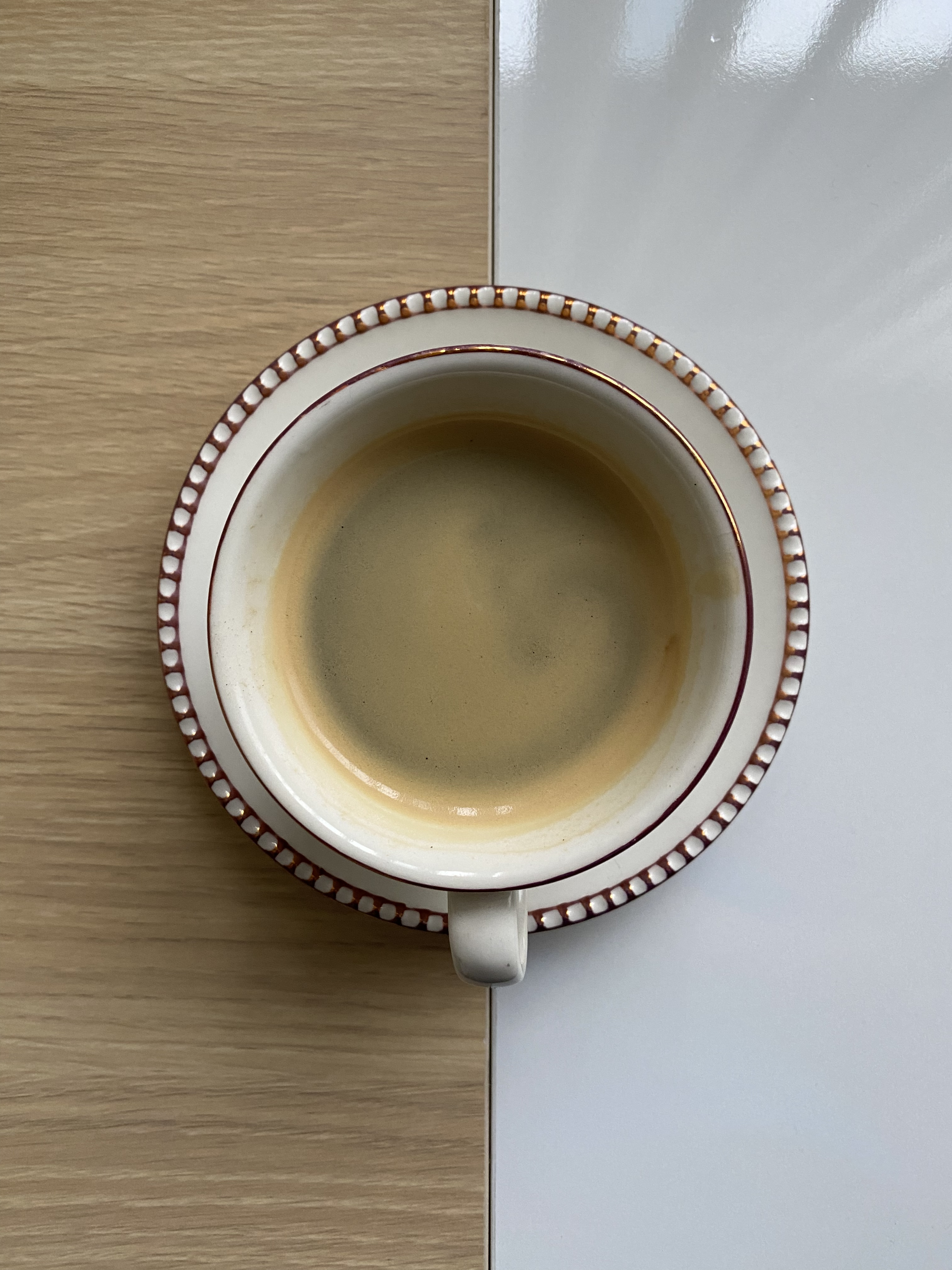
A cup of instant coffee from Italy

A 2009 paper on green coffee states that close to 50% of the world's production of coffee (as green coffee) is used to produce instant coffee.

=== As a beverage ===
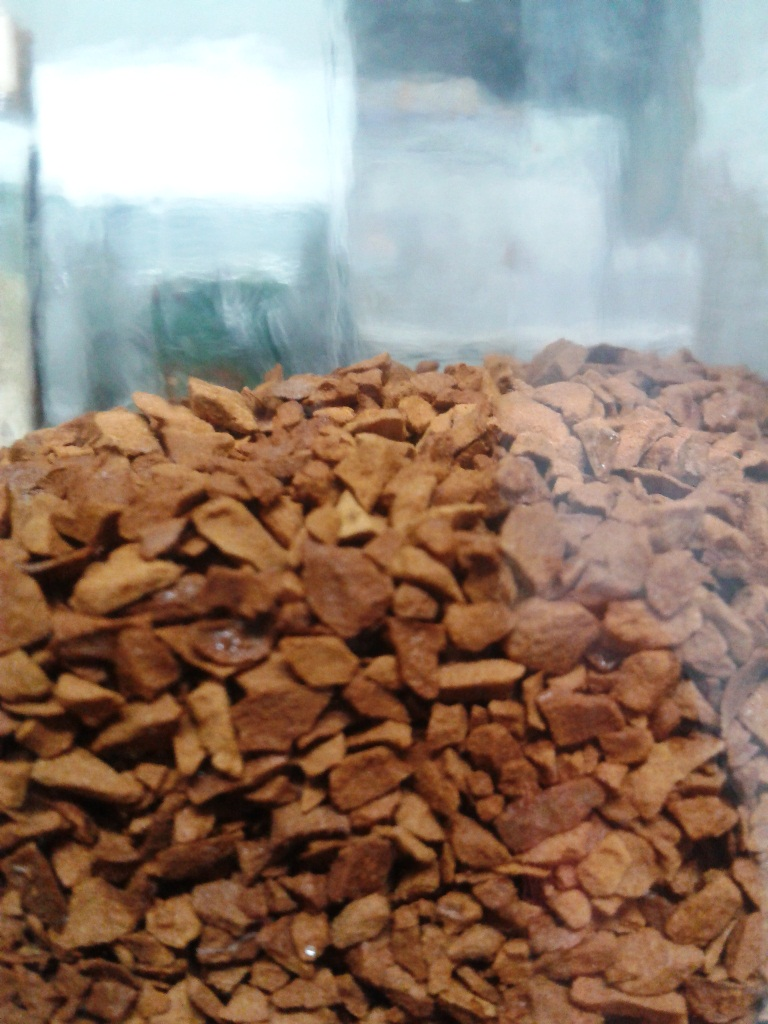
Instant coffee in a glass jar

Instant coffee is sold in powder or granulated form in glass or plastic jars, sachets, or tins. Hot water, or sometimes milk or cold water (for iced coffee such as Greek frappé), is added to it, with milk and sugar if desired, to make a beverage. Strength is controlled by the ratio of coffee powder to liquid.

In some countries, including Portugal, Spain, and India, instant coffee is commonly mixed with hot milk instead of water. Instant coffee is also sold pre-mixed with non-dairy creamer and sugar; this is popular in South Korea, termed "coffee mix".

=== Market ===
The global instant coffee market was valued at US$34.16 billion in 2026. In 2025, Asia-Pacific accounted for 39% of the instant coffee market, Europe 28%, North America 24% and Middle East and Africa 9%.

A 2014 article said that as a percentage of coffee sold, instant coffee accounted for 1% of the market in Italy, 4% in France, 7% in the US, and 77% in the UK. The high proportion in the UK was attributed to coffee, a novelty to a tea-drinking nation, being introduced in the form of instant coffee by US troops in Britain during World War II.

=== Non-beverage uses ===
Instant coffee is used as a flavouring for baked goods, confections, ice creams and food such as stews.

Instant coffee is one of the possible ingredients in Caffenol, a non-toxic black-and-white photographic developer using standard household items developed in 1995 by a photographic chemistry class at Rochester Institute of Technology.

In crafts, instant coffee can be used to stain paper to look aged.

== Composition ==
Typical composition (%db) of instant coffee powder
Minerals	9.0-10.0
Caffeine	4.5-5.1
Lipids	1.5-1.6
Total chlorogenic acids	5.2-7.4
Oligosaccharides	0.7-5.2
Total polysaccharides	~6.5
Proteins	16.0-21.0
Humic acids	15.0

The caffeine content of instant coffee is generally less than that of brewed coffee. One study comparing various home-prepared samples came to the result that regular instant coffee (not decaffeinated) has a median caffeine content of 66 mg per cup (range 29–117 mg per cup), with a median cup size of 225 ml (range 170–285 mL) and a caffeine concentration of 328 μg/mL (range 102–559 μg/mL). In comparison, drip or filter coffee was estimated to have a median caffeine content of 112 mg, with a median concentration of 621 μg/mL for the same cup size.

Regarding antioxidants, the polyphenol content of a 180 ml cup of instant coffee has been estimated to be approximately 320 mg, compared to approximately 400 mg in a cup of brewed coffee of the same size.

== Production ==
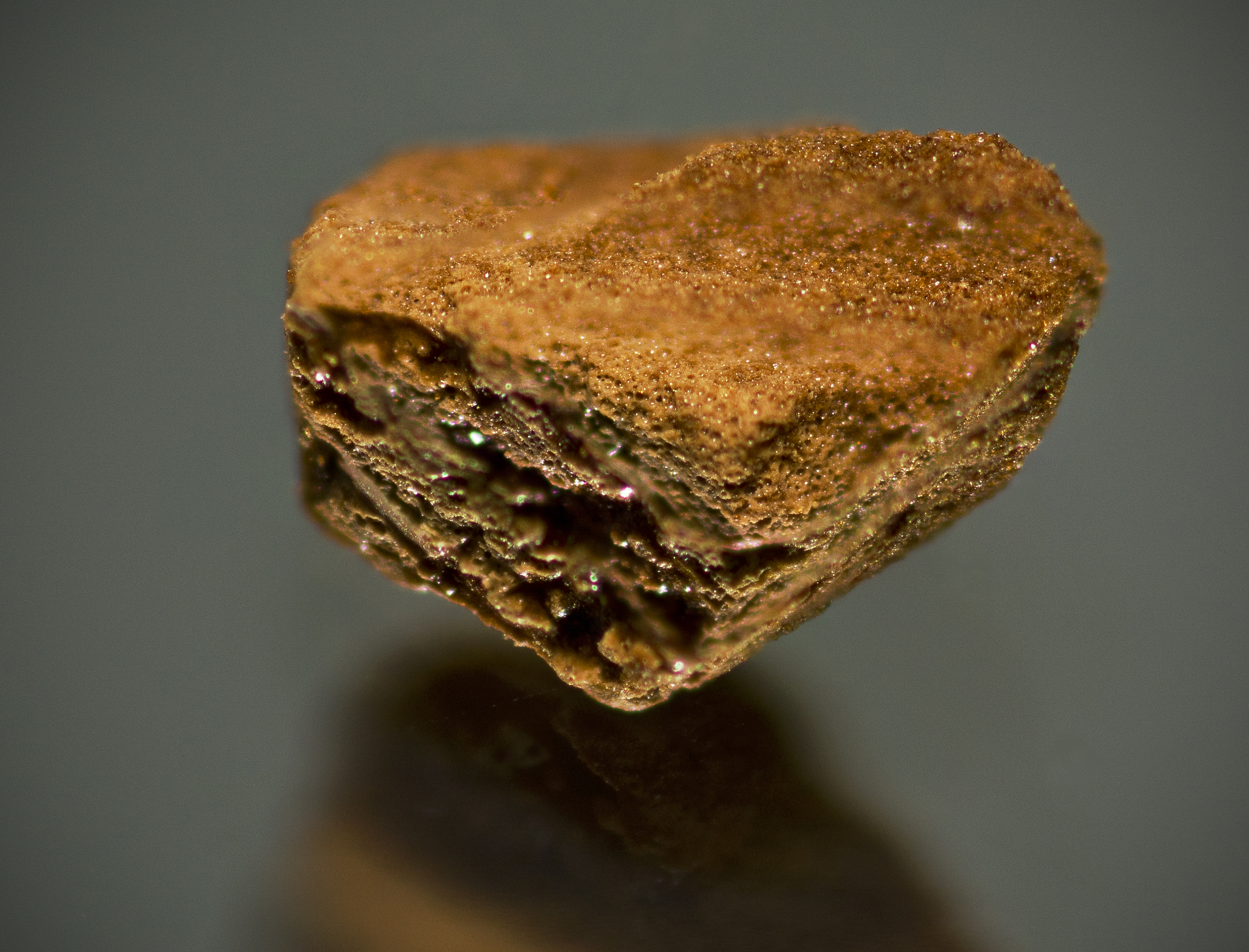
Close-up view of a granule of Nescafé instant coffee

As with regular coffee, the green coffee bean itself is first roasted to bring out flavour and aroma. Using rotating cylinder ovens, the green beans are heated to 165 °C (329 °F) for between 8 and 15 minutes. The beans are then cooled and ground into 0.5-to-1.1-millimetre (0.020 to 0.043 in) pieces. The main byproduct of the instant coffee production process is spent coffee grounds; they can be used as biomass, for example to produce heat used in the manufacturing process. The mass of spent coffee grounds is about twice that of the soluble coffee produced.

=== Extraction ===
To produce instant coffee an industrial-sized drip- or vacuum coffee machine, or percolator, is used to prepare a large volume of coffee beverage, which is then processed by freeze or spray drying, or a combination of the two.

=== Decaffeination ===
The decaffeination of instant coffee is the same as all other coffees and generally happens while beans are still green.

=== Freeze drying ===
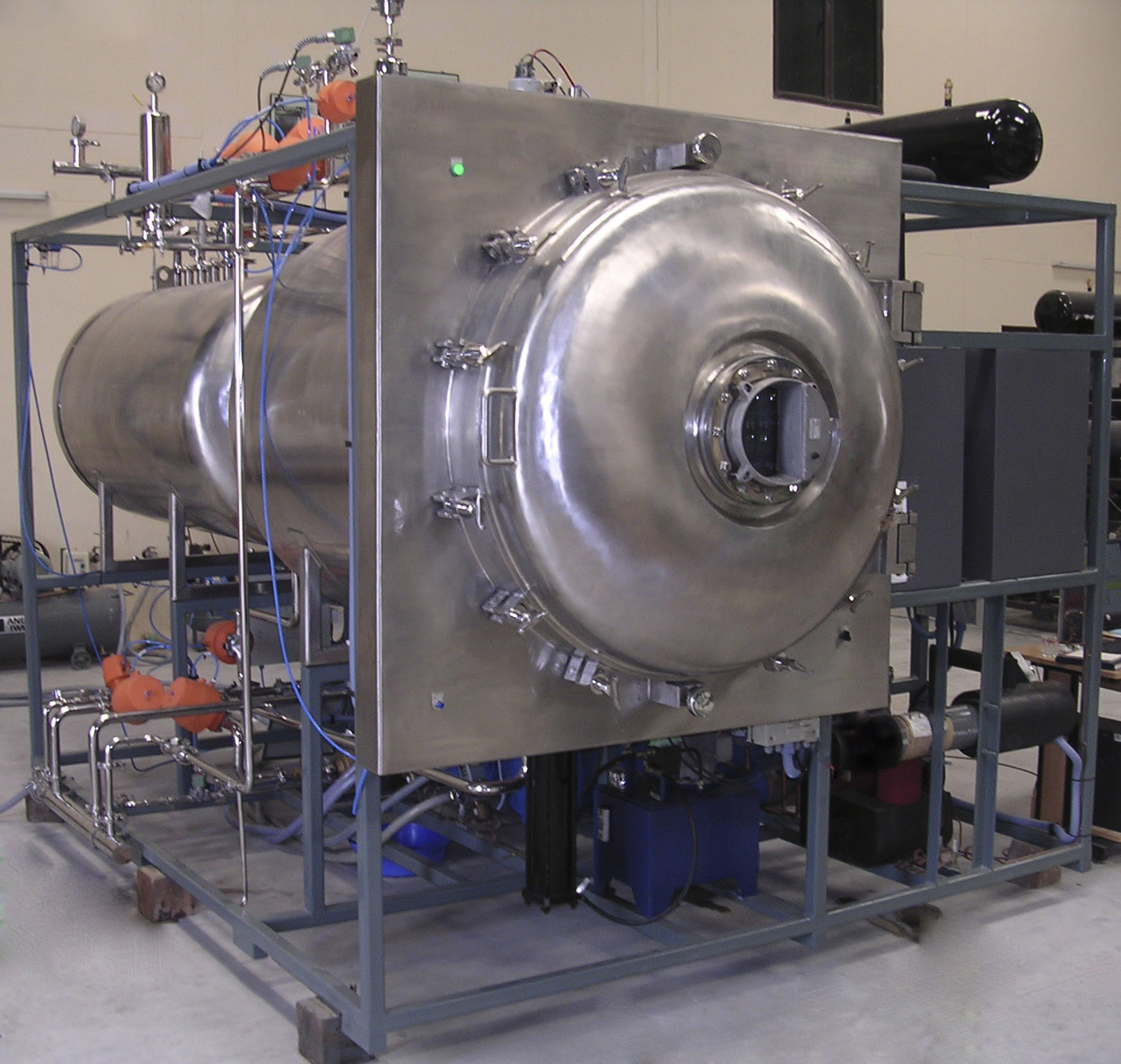
An industrial freeze dryer

The basic principle of freeze drying is the removal of water by sublimation. Since the mass production of instant coffee began in post-WWII America, freeze-drying, which produces a flaky powder, has grown in popularity; it is more expensive than spray drying. Its long processing times may make it unsuitable for small-scale production. In this process, coffee extract is frozen rapidly to prevent the formation of larger ice crystals, then milled into small granules, which are sifted to ensure a uniform size and added to an industrial freeze dryer. The previously frozen water expands the coffee granules to ten times their previous volume through sublimation. The freeze-dried granules are then removed from the chamber and packaged for sale.

=== Spray drying ===
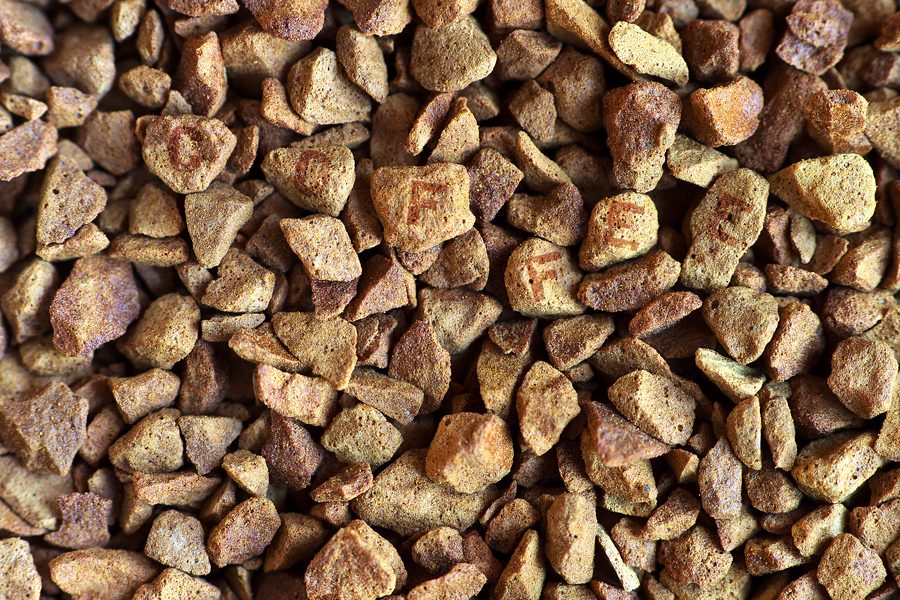
Spray dried instant coffee, agglomerated in granules

Spray-dried instant coffee is cheaper to produce and is preferred to freeze-drying in some cases because it allows larger scale economic production, shorter drying times, and produces fine, round, dust-sized particles. The particles as produced are too fine to use directly; they must first be steam-fused either in towers similar to spray dryers or by belt agglomeration to produce particles of suitable size.

The process produces spherical particles about 300 micrometres (0.012 in) in size with a density of 0.22 g/cm^{3} through a nozzle atomizer. Various ways of nozzle atomization can be used, each having advantages and disadvantages. Wheels rotating at rapid speeds of about 20,000 rpm can process up to 6,000 pounds (2,700 kg) of solution per hour. The use of spray wheels requires that the drying towers have a wide radius to avoid the atomized droplets collecting onto the drying chamber walls. This process can be completed in 5 to 30 seconds, depending on factors such as temperature, size of particle, and diameter of chamber, and can reduce moisture content by over 70%.

== Iron malabsorption ==
Instant coffee decreases intestinal iron absorption more than drip coffee. One study estimated that, when a cup of instant coffee was ingested with a meal composed of semi-purified ingredients, intestinal absorption was reduced from 5.88% to 0.97%, compared to an absorption of 1.64% with drip coffee. It was also estimated that, when the strength of the instant coffee was doubled, intestinal iron absorption fell to 0.53%. However, there is no decrease in iron absorption when instant coffee is consumed 1 hour before a meal, but the same degree of inhibition as with simultaneous ingestion occurs when instant coffee is taken 1 hour after a meal.

== Regulation ==
In the European Union, regulations include the species of coffee bean, geographical origin, processing detail, year of crop, solvents used in decaffeination, and caffeine level.

Various institutions govern the coffee industry and help to achieve standardization and release information to the public, including the International Coffee Organization (London), Codex Alimentarius Commission of the UN (Rome), and National Coffee Association (New York).

== See also ==
- Dalgona coffee
- Instant breakfast
- Instant soup
- Instant tea
- List of instant foods
- List of dried foods
- Powdered milk

== Bibliography ==
- Romualdo Verzosa Jr., ed. (1993). Encyclopedia of Chemical Technology, volume 6 (4th ed.). John Wiley & Sons. ISBN 978-0-471-52674-2.
- Masters, K (1991). Spray Drying Handbook (5th ed.). Longman Scientific & Technical. ISBN 978-0-582-06266-5.
- John J. McKetta, ed. (1995). Encyclopedia of Chemical Processing and Design. Marcel Dekker Inc. ISBN 978-0-8247-2604-1.
