= Cup-a-Soup =

Instant soup product

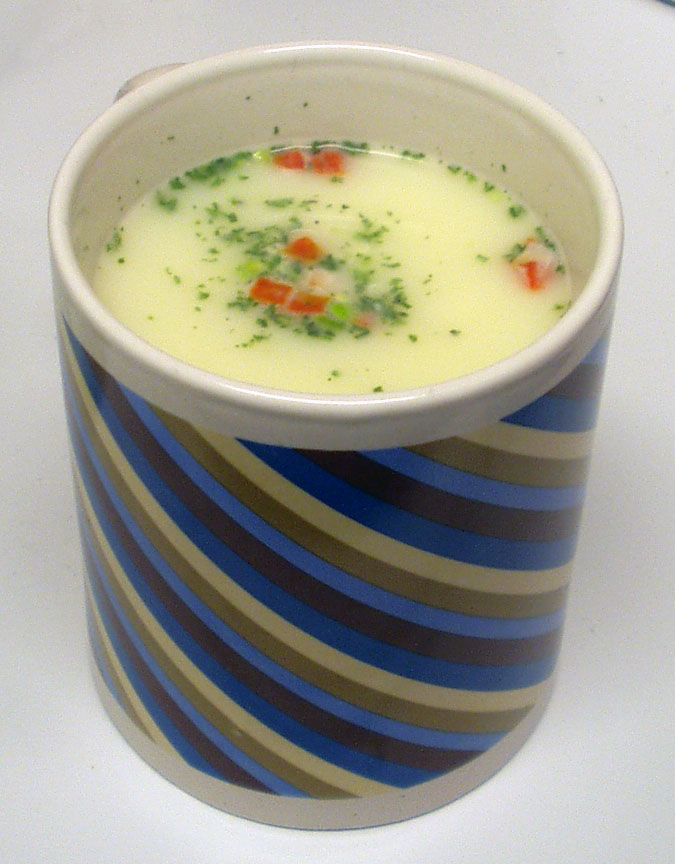
A prepared chicken and vegetable cup-a-soup

Cup-a-Soup is an instant soup product sold under various brands worldwide. The soup is sold in sachets of powder which can be poured into a mug or cup making it a drink, which is then filled with near-boiling water and stirred.

In the United Kingdom the product is sold as Batchelors Cup-a-Soup, a brand which is now owned by Premier Foods. In the Netherlands it is sold under the Unox brand. In South Africa, Sweden, Belgium, Denmark, Germany, Argentina, Poland and India it is sold under the Knorr brand, although it is distributed by Ajinomoto in Japan, which shares the same brand. In the United States and Canada the product is manufactured and marketed under the Lipton brand which is retained by Unilever for use in soup mixes, and in Australia under the Continental brand.

Flavours include minestrone, chicken noodle, tomato soup and chicken and vegetable. Low-calorie versions also exist in the UK, under the name "Slim-a-Soup", and include slightly different flavors, such as Mediterranean tomato. In 2007 "Cup-a-Soup Extra" were introduced, individual sachets of soup and pasta sold in a variety of flavours, including cheese and broccoli (with tagliatelle), chicken and mushroom (with pasta), minestrone and Tangy Salsa Tomato.

== List by brands ==
- Batchelors – introduced Cup a Soup products in 1972
- Continental (brand)
- McCormick & Company

== See also ==
- List of instant foods
