= Quaker Instant Oatmeal =

Oatmeal brand

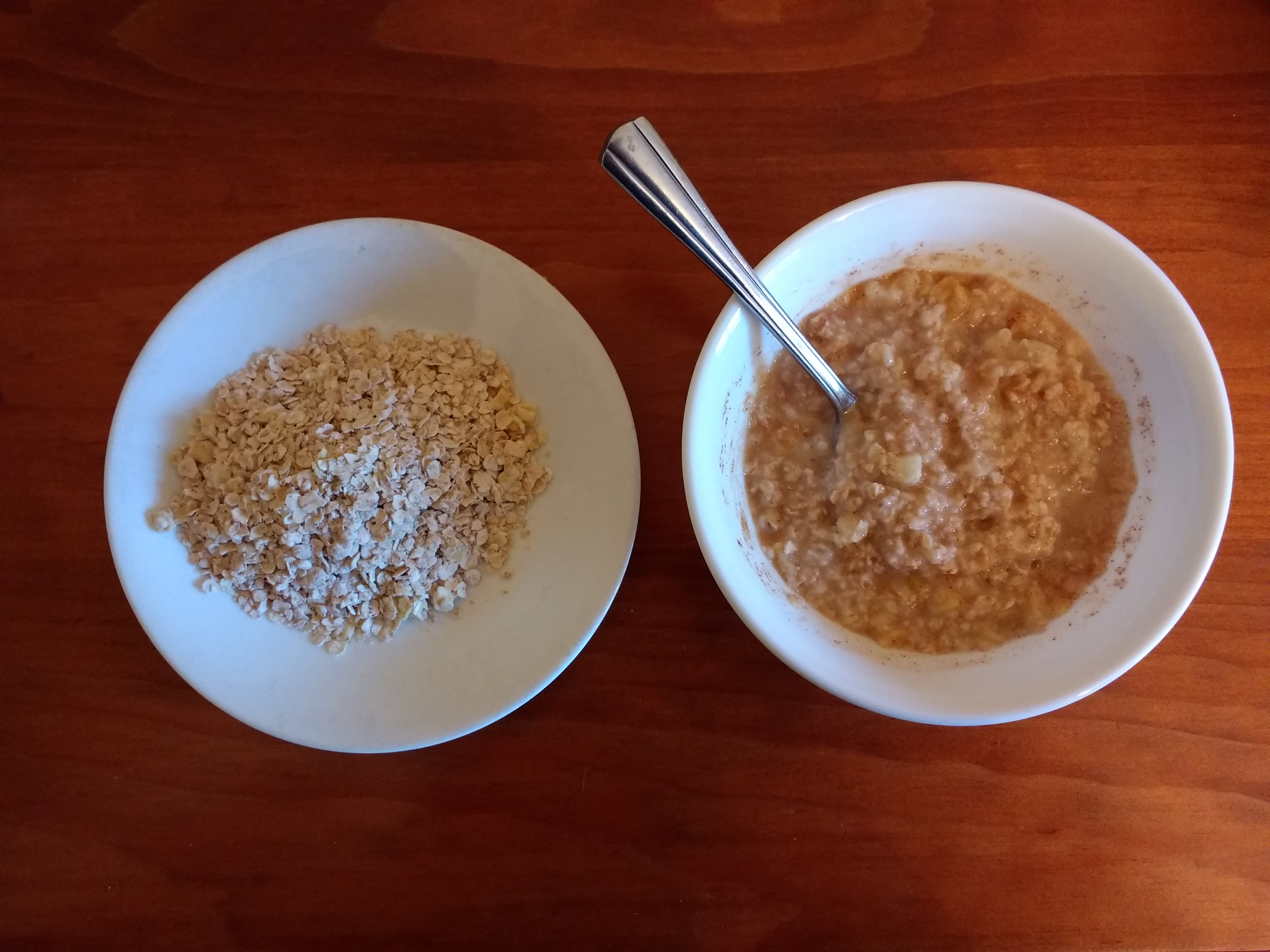
- Apples & Cinnamon flavored Quaker Instant Oatmeal dry (left) and after heating with water added (right)
- Type: Oatmeal
- Created by: Quaker Oats Company

Quaker Instant Oatmeal (Instant Quaker Oatmeal until 1995) is a type of oatmeal made by the Quaker Oats Company, first launched in 1966. It is made from whole grain oats.

It can be consumed in a variety of ways, most commonly with milk or water.

== Quaker Oats Company ==
The Quaker Oats Company originally began as the American Cereal company, but changed its name to The Quaker Oats Company in 1901. The wild success of the company started with its Quaker Oats and quickly expanded to a variety of products produced for the convenience of its takers. Quaker Quick Oats was introduced in 1922, then Life Cereal in 1961, and Quaker Instant Oatmeal in 1966. What is most widely known to most users is flavored instant oatmeal which was introduced in 1970. The Quaker brand was the first brand to feature a recipe on its box, promoting ease of use.

== Preparation ==
Quaker Instant Oatmeal comes in 1.5 oz (43 g) single-serving packets and is usually flavored. Flavors include but are not limited to cinnamon, apple, and honey. The oatmeal is prepared by mixing with boiling water and stirring, hence being referred to as "instant"; once mixed, the oatmeal is ready within a minute. It can also be prepared by adding up to 2/3 cup of water and microwaving for 30–60 seconds. Milk may also be used as a richer substitute for water.

== Differences from traditional oatmeal ==
Quaker Instant Oatmeal has a different taste than oatmeal prepared the traditional way, due to how the oatmeal is processed and prepared. The mouthfeel of the oatmeal is changed as the oatmeal is finely milled to decrease cooking time, and the oatmeal is treated with chemical preservatives and flavoring. Although the taste might be slightly different, the nutritional value of the oats stay relatively the same. All forms are 100% whole grain and have the same nutritional information regarding each serving.

There are also differences in the texture and consistency. Traditional oatmeal is typically thicker and heartier, while instant oatmeal possesses a smoother and more uniform texture. This is due to the fact that instant oatmeal is pre-cooked and dried before packaging, which changes the structure of the oat grains.

== Oats used ==
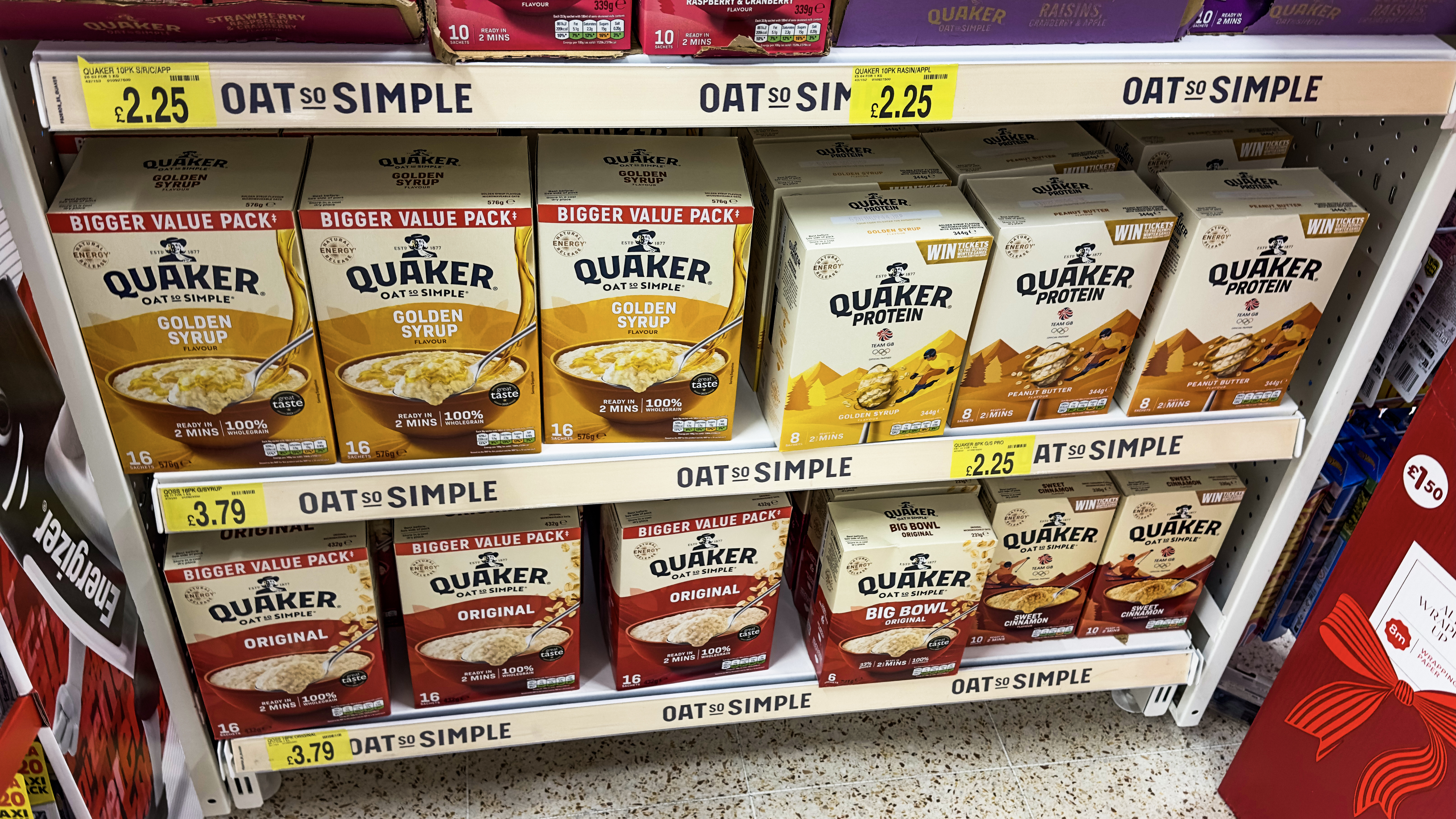
Quaker Oat So Simple porridge products display showing Golden Syrup, Original, and Protein varieties in England

There are many different types of oatmeal produced by the Quaker brand: old fashioned oats, steel cut oats, quick quaker oats, and instant quaker oats. Each type of oatmeal listed is cut and prepared differently which is what gives it its uniqueness.

Old fashioned oats are whole oats that all are rolled out to flatten them. This process allows the oat grains to be cut into small, thin flakes that are easier to cook and digest than whole oat groats. In terms of nutrition, these oats are a good source of fiber, protein, and complex carbohydrates, as well as vitamins and minerals like iron and zinc. This type of oats are also low in fat and sugar.

Steel cut oats are oats made by cutting whole oat groats into smaller pieces using a sharp blade. This process allows for the oats to be formed into small clusters that are both chewy and crunchy at the same time. Steel cut oats typically take longer to cook than rolled oats or instant oatmeal, taking about 20–30 minutes on a stovetop. They require a much higher liquid to oat ratio than other forms of oats to achieve a creamy consistency. Steel cut oats are also rich in fiber, protein, and minerals.

Quick Quaker oats are a type of rolled oats that are cut into smaller pieces and then steamed and flattened, making them thinner and quicker to cook than traditional old-fashioned oats. They have a slight chewy texture and nutty flavor, but not as much as steel cut oats since they are smaller pieces and more finely ground. Quick oats also come in different flavors so there can be added ingredients like salt or sugar.

Instant quaker oats are very finely ground oats and precooked, then dehydrated and flavored with a mix of natural and artificial flavors. Instant oatmeal comes in a wide variety of flavors and the oatmeal can be prepared quickly by adding water or milk. The texture of these oats can be made very creamy due to how finely ground it is.

== Flavors available in the U.S. ==
- Regular
- Maple and Brown Sugar (also available in 50% less sugar)
- Apples and Cinnamon (also available in 50% less sugar)
- Raisins and Spice
- Cinnamon Pecan
- Cinnamon and Spice
- Raisin, Dates and Walnuts
- Strawberries and Cream (also available in 50% less sugar)
- Peaches and Cream (also available in 50% less sugar)
- Blueberries and Cream
- Cinnamon Roll
- Honey and Nut
- Weight Control oatmeal (available in 3 flavors)
- Safari Animal
- Dinosaur eggs (brown sugar w/ dinosaur candies)

== See also ==
- List of instant foods
- List of porridges
- List of dried foods
- Instant breakfast
