= Satori Kato =

Japanese chemist

Satori Kato (June 1847 – ?) was a Japanese chemist. Kato was initially thought to be the inventor of the first soluble instant coffee whilst working in Chicago, after filing a patent in 1901 and exhibiting the product at the Pan-American Exposition until it was rediscovered that David Strang of Invercargill, New Zealand had invented the product twelve years earlier. The New Zealand newspaper, Southland Times, reported on Strang's patent in 1889.
