= Instant breakfast =

Powdered breakfast food

- Type: Instant food
- Course: Breakfast

Instant breakfast typically refers to breakfast food products that are manufactured in a powdered form, which are generally prepared with the addition of milk and then consumed as a drink. Some instant breakfasts are produced and marketed in liquid form. The target market for instant breakfast products includes consumers who tend to be busy, such as students and working adults.

== Etymology ==
Powdered instant breakfast has been described as a breakfast substitute, used as a quick meal replacement in place of traditional quickly prepared breakfast foods such as bacon and eggs, oatmeal and pancakes.

== Brands ==
Carnation-brand Instant Breakfast (renamed Carnation Breakfast Essentials) was introduced in 1964. It is a powdered instant drink that is manufactured with protein, vitamins and minerals and sugar. It is typically prepared with milk, and is available in different flavors, such as chocolate, vanilla and strawberry. Powdered forms are marketed in individual-serving packets and in cans. Carnation also manufactures prepared bottled instant breakfast drinks in liquid form.

== See also ==
- Ensure
- Instant coffee
- Instant noodles
- Instant soup
- List of breakfast foods
- List of breakfast topics
- List of dried foods
- Powdered milk
- Protein shake
- Quaker Instant Oatmeal
- Ready Brek
- Tang
