= Instant sauce =

Industrially prepared sauce mixes

Instant sauces are industrially prepared sauce mixes, typically dehydrated, used to prepare sauces. Instant sauces are typically thickened with thickening agents such as starch.

== List of instant sauces ==
Some popular brands include:

- Asian Home Gourmet
- Bisto
- Knorr
- Lawry's
- Durkee
- French's
- Colman's
- Simply Organic
- Kikkoman
- Lobo
- S&B Foods

Types of sauce available include:

- white
- parsley
- onion
- beef Stroganoff
- garlic and herb
- Béarnaise (thickened with starch rather than egg)
- Alfredo sauce (thickened with starch rather than cheese)
- goulash
- curry
- chili con carne
- pesto
- green peppercorn
- Hollandaise (thickened with starch rather than egg)
- cream
- beef, chicken, turkey gravy

== See also ==
- Instant soup
- Instant custard
