= Instant soup =

Type of soup designed for fast and simple preparation

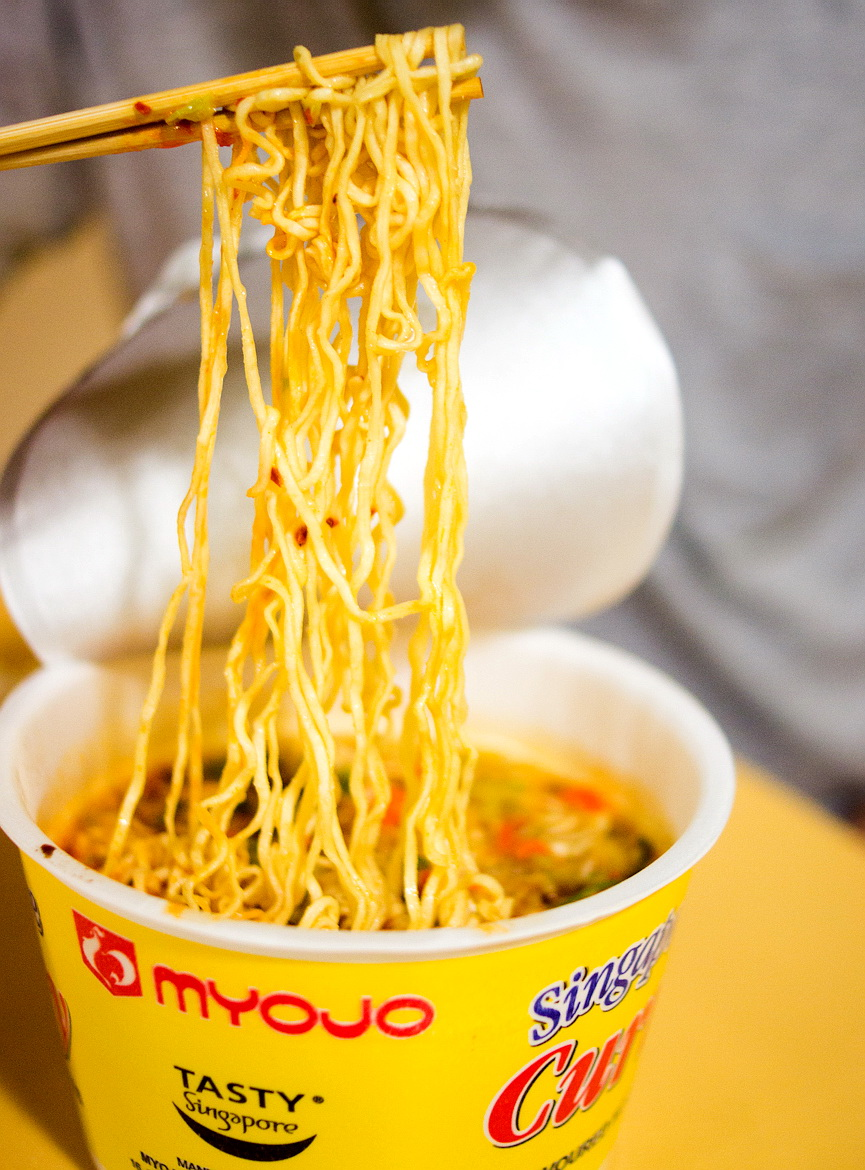
- A cup of instant ramen noodle soup
- Type: Soup
- Serving temperature: Hot
- Main ingredients: Dry soup stock or powder, dehydrated vegetables and meats, preservatives; Various standard soup ingredients are used in prepared canned varieties
- Variations: Dried, canned, paste

Instant soup is a type of soup designed for fast and simple preparation. Some are homemade, and some are mass-produced on an industrial scale and treated in various ways to preserve them. A wide variety of types, styles and flavors of instant soups exist. Commercial instant soups are usually dried or dehydrated, canned, or treated by freezing.

== Types ==
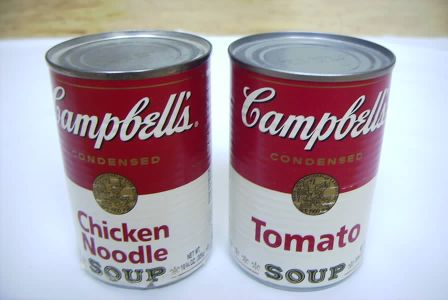
Campbell's condensed canned soup

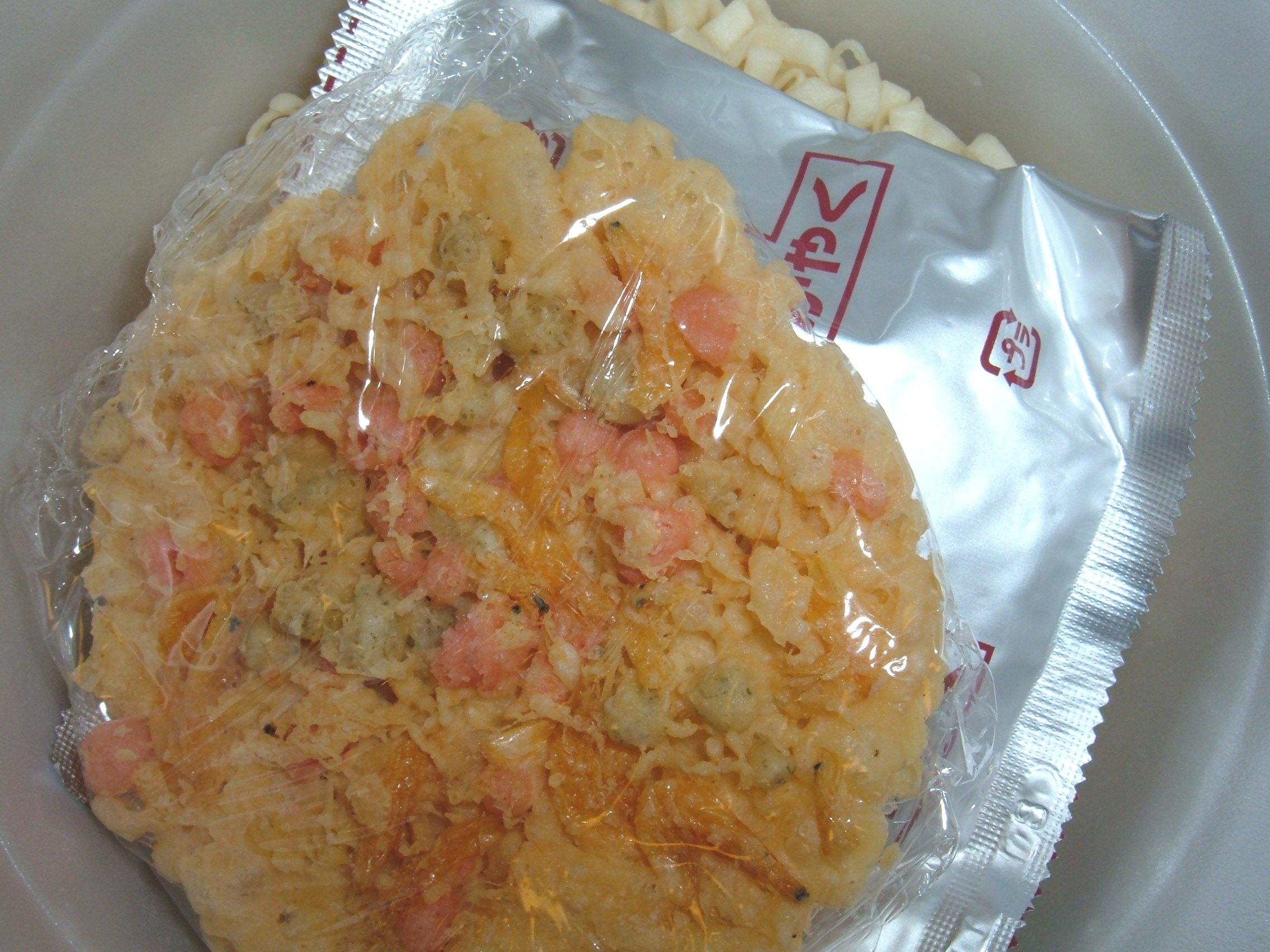
Instant tempura udon, with the tempura and soup packaging

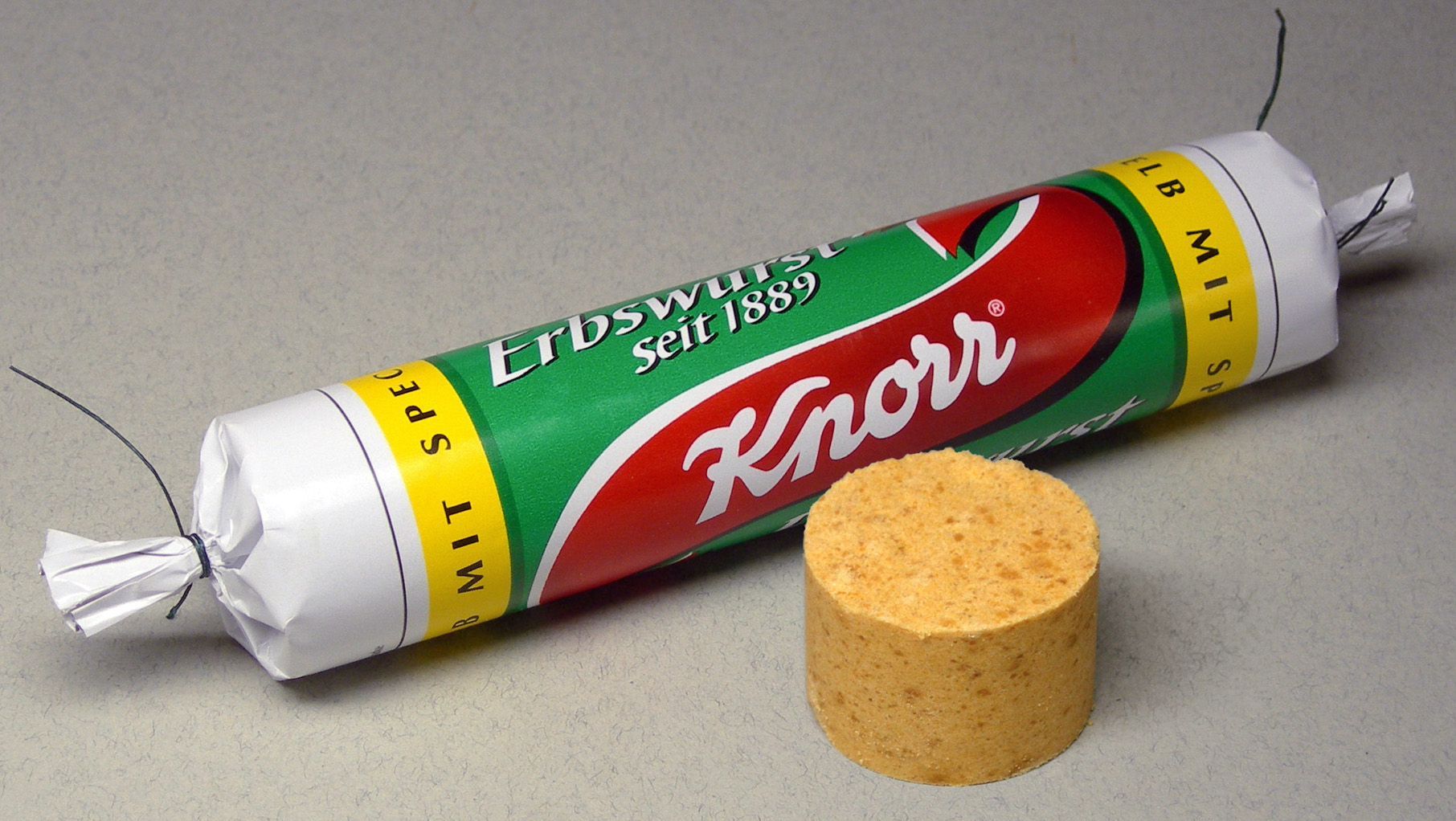
Erbswurst, a traditional instant pea soup from Germany, was sold as a concentrated paste.

Commercial instant soups are manufactured in several types. Some consist of a packet of dry soup stock. These do not contain water, and are prepared by adding water and then heating the product for a short time, or by adding hot water directly to the dry soup mix. Instant soup can also be produced in a dry powder form, such as Unilever's Cup-a-Soup.

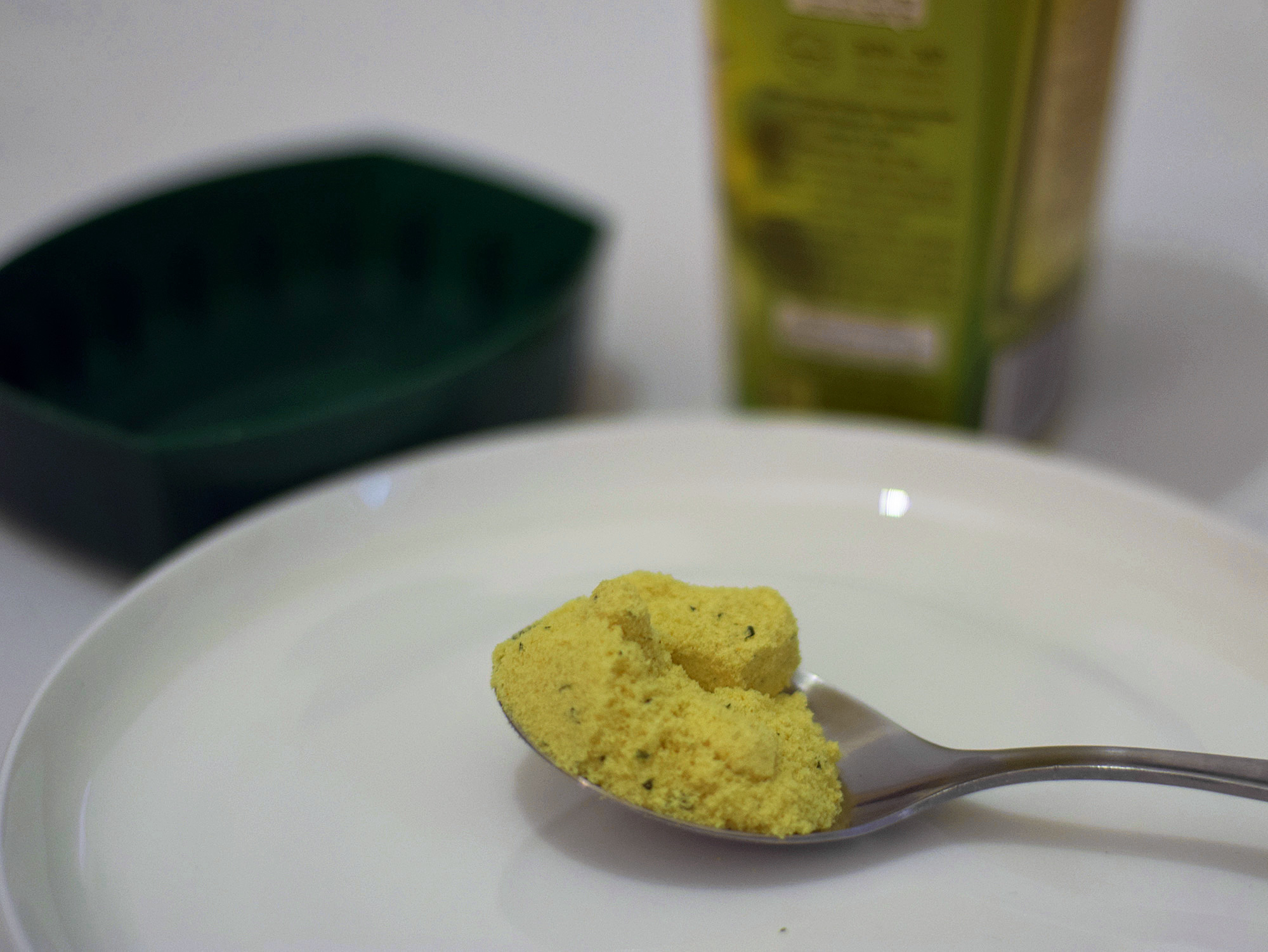
Instant soup in a powder form

Canned (tinned) instant soups contain liquid soup that is prepared by heating their contents. Some canned soups are condensed, and require additional water to bring them to their intended strength, while others are canned in a ready-to-eat, single-strength form. Dr. John T. Dorrance, an employee with the Campbell's, invented condensed soup in 1897. Consumers sometimes use condensed soups (without diluting them), as a sauce base. Some instant liquid soups are manufactured in microwaveable containers. Additionally, some instant soups, such as Knorr's Erbswurst, are prepared in a concentrated paste form. Knorr ceased production of Erbswurst on December 31, 2018.

Instant noodle soups such as Cup Noodles contain dried instant ramen noodles, dehydrated vegetable and meat products, and seasonings, and are prepared by adding hot water. Packaged instant ramen noodle soup is typically formed as a cake, and often includes a seasoning packet that is added to the noodles and water during preparation. Some also include separate packets of oil and garnishes used to season the product. Momofuku Ando, the founder of Nissin Foods, developed packaged ramen noodle soup in 1958.

== Varieties ==
A multitude of instant soup varieties exist. For example, there are several Lipton and Knorr-brand dry instant soups, such as onion, vegetable, tomato beef and cream of spinach. Instant miso soup is generally manufactured in two forms, one as miso paste with preserved vegetable condiments, generally of the shiro (white) kind, and the other as granulated miso. One of the primary uses of dehydrated miso is for the production of instant miso soup. Chicken, beef and seafood/shrimp are the most popular flavors by consumers of ramen noodle instant soups.

== Manufacture ==
Commercially prepared instant soups are usually dried or dehydrated, canned, or treated by freezing. Some dry instant soups are prepared with thickening ingredients, such as pregelatinized starch, that function at a lower temperature compared to others. Additional ingredients used in commercial instant soups to contribute to their consistency include maltodextrins, emulsified fat powders, sugars, potato starch, xanthan gum, and guar gum.

=== Dry instant soups ===
Sometimes ingredients used in dry instant soups are ground into fragments, which enables them to be dissolved when water is added. These particulates are sometimes prepared using freeze-drying and puff drying.

Freeze-drying is a recent dehydration breakthrough method that is restricted to high-value foods due to the high cost associated with the process. Despite its cost, freeze-drying is very effective in retaining the overall quality and nutritional value of the food through a process called sublimation, where water is removed (evaporated) from food in its frozen state without the transition through the liquid state. Removing water from food prevents spoilage as it does not give an environment that favors the growth of spoilage-causing microorganisms such as bacteria, mould, and yeast. Freeze-drying also reduces the total weight of the food, especially fruit and vegetables that are mostly water, thus making the transportation of these products more efficient. Vegetables used in instant soup mixes often undergo freeze-drying which helps them retain their nutritional value, texture, and flavor. Furthermore, as the food remains rigid during dehydration, subliming water creates holes where the evaporated ice crystals used to be. This allows freeze-dried foods such as vegetables to retain their shape without shrinkage, and these foods rehydrate completely when water is added to the mix that fills the voids left by the subliming water. Due to the reduced water content of the freeze-dried foods that inhibit the growth of microorganisms and prevent enzymatic chemical reactions, these foods are considered shelf-stable and can be kept safe from spoilage for years by preventing the reabsorption of moisture. Freeze-dried foods can be stored at room temperature without the need for refrigeration.

Although uncommon compared to most applications, sometimes a seasoning solution is sprayed directly onto ramen noodles to enhance their flavor, prior to being packaged.

Powder seasoning packets may also contain anticaking agents and flow agents to prevent the product from clumping into a solid mass.

=== Flavor design ===
Flavor ingredients used in instant ramen noodle soup include dried vegetables and meats, salt, MSG, onion, garlic, yeast extract, hydrolyzed vegetable protein, essential oil extracts and natural or synthetic flavor compounds. Essential oils derived from onion, garlic and clove are sometimes used as flavorings for instant ramen soup, and may be manufactured using expeller pressing or solvent extraction and distillation. Sophisticated methods exist that create flavor compounds, or complex flavors, for the flavoring of instant ramen noodle soups. A desired flavor is analyzed using techniques such as gas chromatography utilized with mass spectrometry and olfactometry, so that it can be reconstituted through blending more common ingredients.

== Uses ==
Besides being used to prepare soup, instant soups are often used as an ingredient in cooking, analogous to how stock and its instant version bouillon cubes are often used.

- Condensed cream of mushroom soup is particularly popular for making casseroles.
- Dehydrated onion soup mix is used to prepare French onion dip.

== See also ==
- Convenience food
- Instant breakfast
- Instant coffee
- List of dried foods
- Powdered milk
- Cup-a-Soup
