= Instant tea =

Concentrated dry tea beverage mix

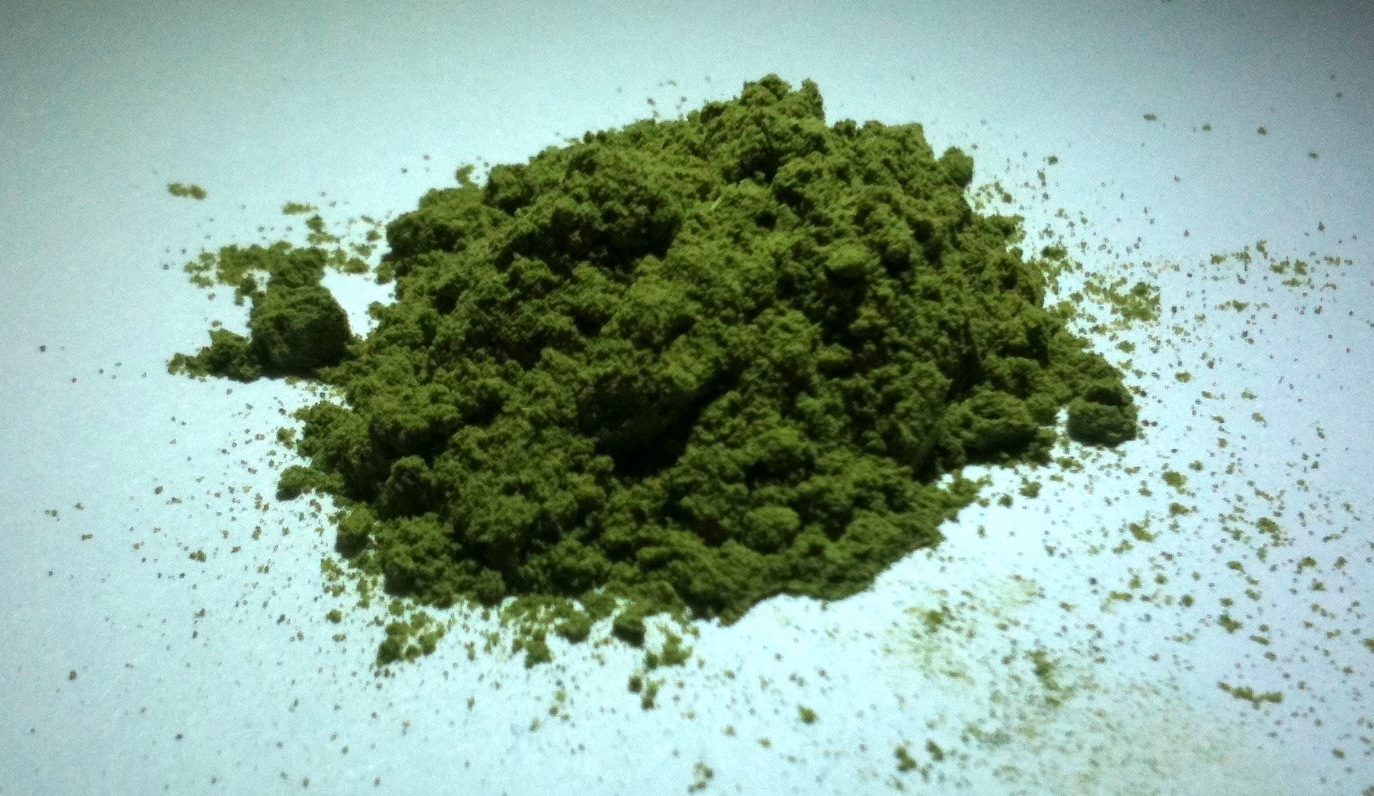
Funmatsucha: instant green tea

Instant tea is a powdered mix in which water is added, in order to reconstitute it into a cup of tea. The earliest form of instant tea was developed in the United Kingdom in 1885. A patent was granted for a paste made of concentrated tea extract, sugar, and evaporated milk, which became tea when hot water was added. However, no notable developments were made until spray drying technology allowed for drying the tea concentrates at a temperature which did not damage the flavors of the product.

== Composition and structure ==
Instant tea powder by itself is the dehydrated flavor, aroma, and color compounds found in tea. When marketed, other ingredients can be added, such as sugar for taste, citric acid for tartness, and other flavors that would not normally be found in tea leaves, such as those of raspberry or lemon. Physically speaking, the reconstituted tea is mostly water with compounds dissolved within it to give a certain taste. This means that the tea falls under the classification of a Newtonian fluid. Flavor and color compounds being evenly distributed when water is added indicates that the reconstituted tea is a homogeneous mixture. While traditional tea prepared using tea leaves and hot water has insoluble compounds that would cause it to be a suspension as well, instant tea is manufactured with the intent of being dissolved in water.

== Manufacturing ==
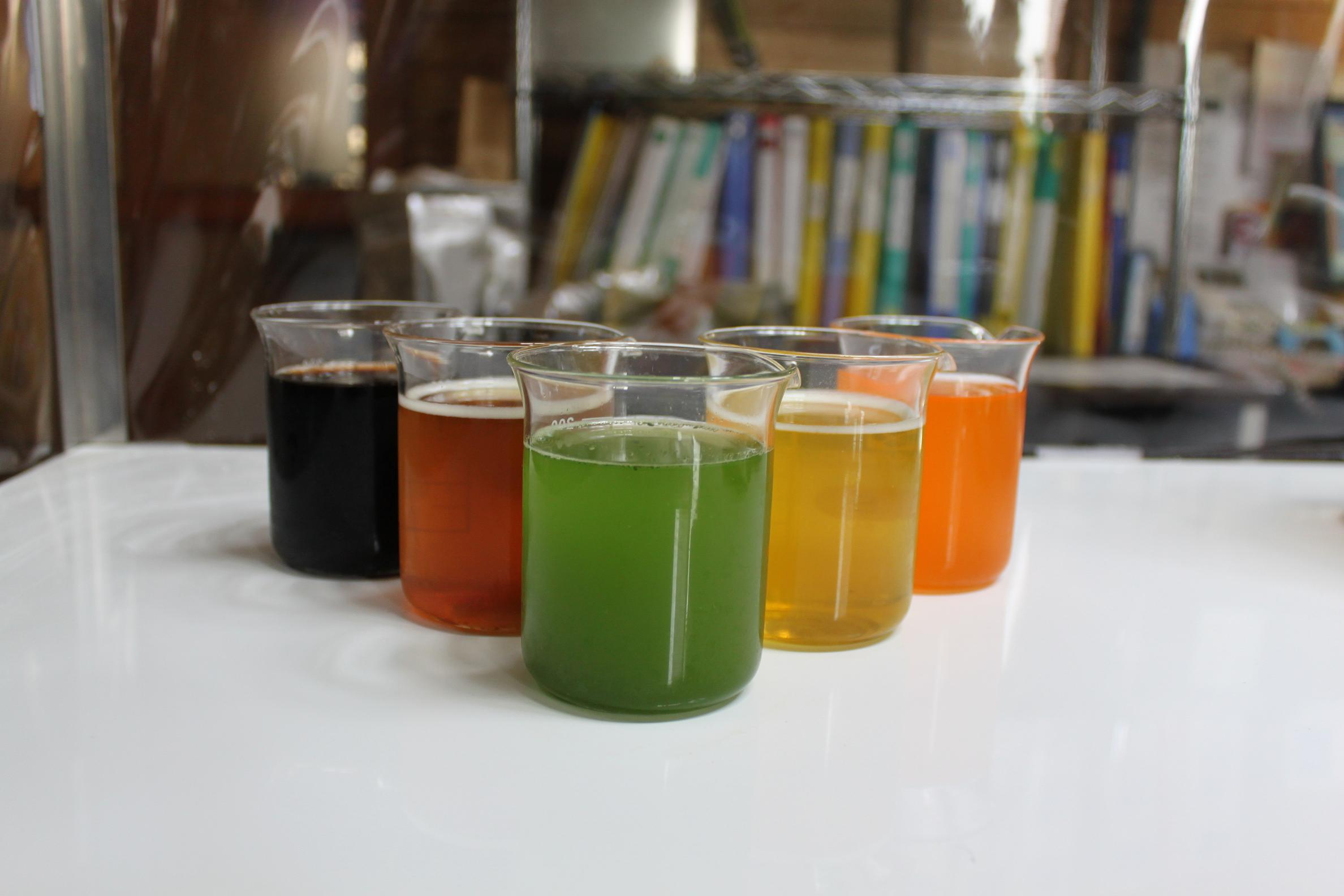
Various reconstituted instant teas

Production of instant tea can be broken down into six main steps: selection of raw materials, extraction, aroma stripping, tea cream processing, concentration, and drying.

Selection of tea leaves is done with the best interests of both the manufacturer and end user. Because of certain legal restrictions in tea producing countries, it is most cost effective for manufacturers to use fermented, undried black leaves, as they do not have to pass through public auctions and are therefore cheaper. Quality is not sacrificed, as research has been done to show that this type of leaf has similar flavor when compared to dried, black leaves.

Extraction is done with two goals in mind: yield of tea solids extracted from the leaf, and concentration of the extract solution. Research has shown that tea leaf solubles in a column extractor can be described in a system of three components, each which obey a first-order solution law. The explanation given for why the soluble compounds fall into any of these three categories is based on how accessible they are. The instantly soluble compounds are likely to be right on the surface of the leaf, which is why they are the first to be obtained. The rapidly soluble components are thought to be from the inside of the leaves, where broken cell structures slow both the rate of solvent entering as well as solute leaving. The slowest soluble compounds are expected to have either high molecular mass, which would take longer to move through the cell matrices of the leaves, or products formed during hydrolysis over the course of the extraction. There are a variety of methods and machinery that can be used to perform extraction, but the general concept is that the leaves are treated with a solvent in order to extract the compounds within them. In the aforementioned study, it was stated that the maximum yield of solids that could be extracted was 35%. Over time, other chemical methods of increasing extraction yields have been discovered, such as using hydrogen peroxide on extracted leaves to obtain a yield of 42% solids. After the extraction step, the solution is clarified by passing through a decanter, centrifuge, or filter press.

Stripping is a physical separation process where components can be removed from a liquid stream through usage of a vapor stream. The stripping gas, typically steam, nitrogen, or carbon dioxide, passes through the liquid solution and dissolves the aromatic compounds within it. Aroma compounds are easily volatilized into the air. For this reason, passing gas through the liquid provides a favorable condition for the compounds to leave the liquid. The equation for determining the rate of mass transfer between a food and the gas phase is:

${dm \over dt} = 2({{D_c} / \pi t_c})^{1 \over 2}A_{gc}[{c_e}^i(t)-{c_e}(t)]$ or ${dm \over dt} = h_DA_{gc}[{c_e}^i(t)-{c_e}(t)]$

Where h_{D} is the overall mass transfer coefficient and is substituted for $2({{D_c} / \pi t_c})^{1 \over 2}$

The variable ${dm \over dt}$ is the rate of mass transfer into the gas phase, D_{c} is the average diffusion coefficient of free aroma molecules in the emulsion, A_{gc} is the surface area of the gas/food interface, t_{c} is the time that the surface elements are exposed to the surface, and ${c_e}^i(t)$ and ${c_e}(t)$ are the concentrations of aroma compounds in the interface and emulsion, respectively.

With respect to stripping, A_{gc} has the greatest effect on the mass transfer rate. Maximizing the surface area for mass transfer is done by using the smallest bubbles possible when stripping. Assuming spherical structure of the bubbles, the surface area is given by $4\pi r^2$, and the volume is given by ${4 \over 3 }{\pi r^3}$. This implies that at any increase in radius, the volume increases by a greater factor than the surface area. This also means that at the smallest possible volume, there will be the greatest surface area to volume ratio, giving a greater surface area for reactions. The use of inert gas is favored because it prevents oxidation, and therefore deterioration of the aroma compounds.

Black tea contains compounds that have low solubilities, which tend to bind together. The solution becomes cloudy and changes color to pale brown. This phenomenon is known as tea creaming. Research has shown that the cream is a colloidal substance that contains many of the compounds that contribute to color and flavor of black tea, and can contain up to 30% of the total solids. The driving force behind cream formation is the insolubility of theaflavin and polyphenols, which associate together through galloyl group interactions. The theaflavins have acidic properties which cause them to have a negative charge at the pH of black tea, which is roughly 4.9. Normally this would lead to electrostatic repulsions between the molecules, stabilizing the colloid. However, the presence of calcium ions (Ca^{2+}) can neutralize these charges, promoting aggregation. Other charged metal ions, such as magnesium and aluminum, are also present in high concentrations in tea, but neither ions partition as well into tea as those of calcium. Glycosylation of the solution is also found to increase solubility of polyphenols while weakening self association. The proposed explanation is that the sheer size of the sugar makes it hard for other molecules to interact with each other. In the American market, instant tea is expected by the consumer to be clear when reconstituted, which makes the cream an unacceptable part of the solution. Industrially, a variety of methods have been patented to deal with the issue, such as the utilization of tannase to solubilize the cream. Another method developed was based on the identification of two classes in cream: low molecular weight compounds such as the polyphenols that contribute to flavor, and higher molecular weight compounds such as polysaccharides, polypeptides, and proteins. This process removes the high molecular weight compounds through ultrafiltration, absorption chromatography or oil filtration. The flavor compounds remain and do not cream.

After the extraction and tea creaming processes, the tea solution is still too dilute to pass through a drier. Drying at this point would take too much capital for little gain, and any type of spray or freeze-drying would cause the resulting powder to have too low a density. The answer is to first concentrate the solution to what is usually 40% solids before drying, which involves the removal of water through evaporation. Concentration of tea is normally done through reduction of pressure. At high temperatures, the theaflavins in the solution are converted to thearubigins and carbohydrates caramelize. Forced evaporation systems had hot spots which led to undesirable sensory characteristics such as stewed and burnt flavors. Plate heat exchangers can cause the desired evaporation at around 45 °C, with short residence times that reduce the risk of thermal damage. This method can produce an extract with 45% solids. Aroma stripping is done prior to concentration, because those compounds run the risk of being lost during evaporation.

Spray drying is the final step in creating instant tea, disregarding control points and packaging. It is the preferred method of drying as opposed to freeze-drying because it is cheaper without sacrificing quality. The principle behind spray drying is one similar to that of aroma stripping, where smaller particles have a greater surface to area ratio. By forcing the liquid extract through a nozzle, the solution atomizes, or becomes very fine droplets. These droplets are met with a countercurrent of hot gas, causing them to evaporate and leave only the solids behind. Droplets are generally dried to around 3-5%, as any lower would increase the risk of burning and anything above could possibly reduce shelf life through increased water activity.
