= TAS1R1 =

Protein-coding gene in humans

Identifiers
- Aliases: TAS1R1, GPR70, T1R1, TR1, GM148, taste 1 receptor member 1
- External IDs: OMIM: 606225; MGI: 1927505; GeneCards: TAS1R1

Gene location (Human)
Chr.	Chromosome 1 (human)
Band	1p36.31	Start	6,555,307 bp
Band	1p36.31	End	6,579,755 bp

Gene location (Mouse)
Chr.	Chromosome 4 (mouse)
Band	4 E2|4 82.83 cM	Start	152,112,371 bp
Band	4 E2|4 82.83 cM	End	152,123,025 bp
RNA expression pattern
Bgee	Human / Mouse (ortholog); Top expressed in: gonad; testicle; left testis; right testis; muscle of thigh; right adrenal cortex; gallbladder; gastrocnemius muscle; olfactory zone of nasal mucosa; Descending thoracic aorta / Top expressed in: yolk sac; spermatid; morula; seminiferous tubule; blastocyst; embryo; spermatocyte; muscle of thigh; dentate gyrus of hippocampal formation granule cell; primary visual cortex; More reference expression data
BioGPS	n/a
Gene ontology
Molecular function	G protein-coupled receptor activity; signal transducer activity; taste receptor activity; protein heterodimerization activity; signaling receptor activity
Cellular component	integral component of membrane; plasma membrane; membrane; integral component of plasma membrane
Biological process	sensory perception of umami taste; signal transduction; response to stimulus; sensory perception of taste; G protein-coupled receptor signaling pathway; detection of chemical stimulus involved in sensory perception of taste
Sources:Amigo / QuickGO
Orthologs
Databases	NCBI: entry; OMA: entry
Species	Human	Mouse
Entrez	80835	110326
Ensembl	ENSG00000173662	ENSMUSG00000028950
UniProt	Q7RTX1	Q99PG6
RefSeq (mRNA)	NM_138697; NM_177539; NM_177540; NM_177541	NM_031867
RefSeq (protein)	NP_619642; NP_803884	NP_114073
Location (UCSC)	Chr 1: 6.56 – 6.58 Mb	Chr 4: 152.11 – 152.12 Mb
PubMed search
- Wikidata
View/Edit Human	View/Edit Mouse

Taste receptor type 1 member 1 is a protein that in humans is encoded by the TAS1R1 gene.

== Structure ==
The protein encoded by the TAS1R1 gene is a G protein-coupled receptor with seven trans-membrane domains and is a component of the heterodimeric amino acid taste receptor T1R1+3. This receptor is formed as a dimer of the TAS1R1 and TAS1R3 proteins. Moreover, the TAS1R1 protein is not functional outside of formation of the 1+3 heterodimer. The TAS1R1+3 receptor has been shown to respond to L-amino acids but not to their D-enantiomers or other compounds. This ability to bind L-amino acids, specifically L-glutamine, enables the body to sense the umami, or savory, taste. Multiple transcript variants encoding several different isoforms have been found for this gene, which may account for differing taste thresholds among individuals for the umami taste. Another interesting quality of the TAS1R1 and TAS1R2 proteins is their spontaneous activity in the absence of the extracellular domains and binding ligands. This may mean that the extracellular domain regulates function of the receptor by preventing spontaneous action as well as binding to activating ligands such as L-glutamine.

== Ligands ==
The umami taste is distinctly related to the compound monosodium glutamate (MSG). Synthesized in 1908 by Japanese chemist Kikunae Ikeda, this flavor-enhancing compound led to the naming of a new flavor quality that was named "umami", the Japanese word for "tasty". The TAS1R1+3 taste receptor is sensitive to the glutamate in MSG as well as the synergistic taste-enhancer molecules inosine monophosphate (IMP) and guanosine monophosphate (GMP). These taste-enhancer molecules are unable to activate the receptor alone, but are rather used to enhance receptor responses to many L-amino acids.

== Signal transduction ==
TAS1R1 and TAS1R2 receptors have been shown to bind to G proteins, most often the gustducin Gα subunit, although a gustducin knock-out has shown small residual activity. TAS1R1 and TAS1R2 have also been shown to activate Gαo and Gαi. This suggests that TAS1R1 and TAS1R2 are G protein-coupled receptors that inhibit adenylyl cyclases to decrease cyclic guanosine monophosphate (cGMP) levels in taste receptors.

Research done by creating knock-outs of common channels activated by sensory G-protein second messenger systems has also shown a connection between umami taste perception and the phosphatidylinositol (PIP2) pathway. The nonselective cation transient receptor potential channel TRPM5 has been shown to correlate with both umami and sweet taste. Also, the phospholipase PLCβ2 was shown to similarly correlate with umami and sweet taste. This suggests that activation of the G-protein pathway and subsequent activation of PLC β2 and the TRPM5 channel in these taste cells functions to activate the cell.

== Location and innervation ==
TAS1R1+3 expressing cells are found mostly in the fungiform papillae at the tip and edges of the tongue and palate taste receptor cells in the roof of the mouth. These cells are shown to synapse upon the chorda tympani nerves to send their signals to the brain, although some activation of the glossopharyngeal nerve has been found. TAS1R and TAS2R (bitter) channels are not expressed together in taste buds.
