= Ajinomoto =

Japanese food and biotechnology company

Ajinomoto Co., Inc.
- Logo used since 2017

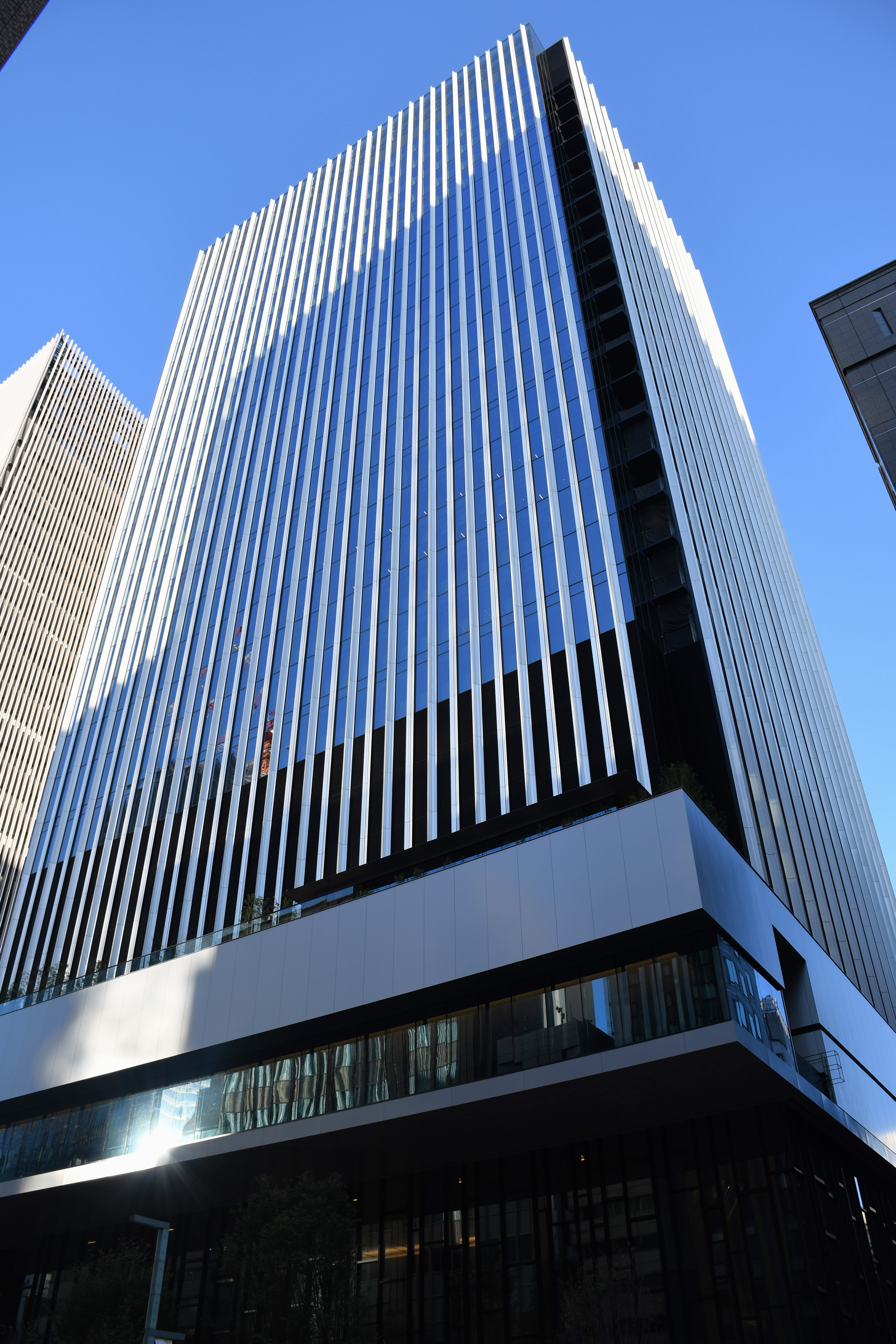
- Headquarters in Tokyo, since 2026
- Trade name: Ajinomoto
- Native name: 味の素株式会社
- Romanized name: Ajinomoto Kabushiki-gaisha
- Formerly: S. Suzuki & Co. Ltd.
- Type: Public
- Traded as: TYO: 2802; MYX: 2658; TOPIX Large 70 Component
- Industry: Food; Biotechnology
- Founded: May 17, 1917; 109 years ago
- Headquarters: Chūō, Tokyo, Japan
- Area served: Worldwide
- Key people: Shigeo Nakamura (president and CEO)
- Products: Seasonings, cooking oils, frozen foods, sweeteners, amino acids and pharmaceuticals
- Revenue: ¥1,530 billion (FY 2024)
- Operating income: ¥159 billion (FY 2024)
- Net income: ▲¥80 billion (FY 2024)
- Total assets: ▲¥1,721 billion (FY 2024)
- Total equity: ▲¥813 billion (FY 2024)
- Number of employees: 34,862 (FY 2024)
- Website: ajinomoto.com

Ajinomoto Co., Inc. (味の素株式会社, Ajinomoto kabushiki gaisha; Japanese pronunciation: [a.(d)ʑi.noꜜ.mo.to]) is a Japanese multinational food and biotechnology corporation which produces seasonings, cooking oils, frozen foods, beverages, sweeteners, amino acids, insulating films, and pharmaceuticals. Aji-No-Moto (味の素, "essence of taste") is the trade name for the company's original monosodium glutamate (MSG) product, the first of its kind, since 1909. The corporation's head office is located in Chūō, Tokyo. As of 2024, Ajinomoto operates in 31 countries worldwide and employs an estimated 34,862 people. Its yearly revenue in 2024 is around ¥1.53 trillion JPY or $10.61 billion USD.

== History ==
=== 1907–1944: Origins and expansion ===
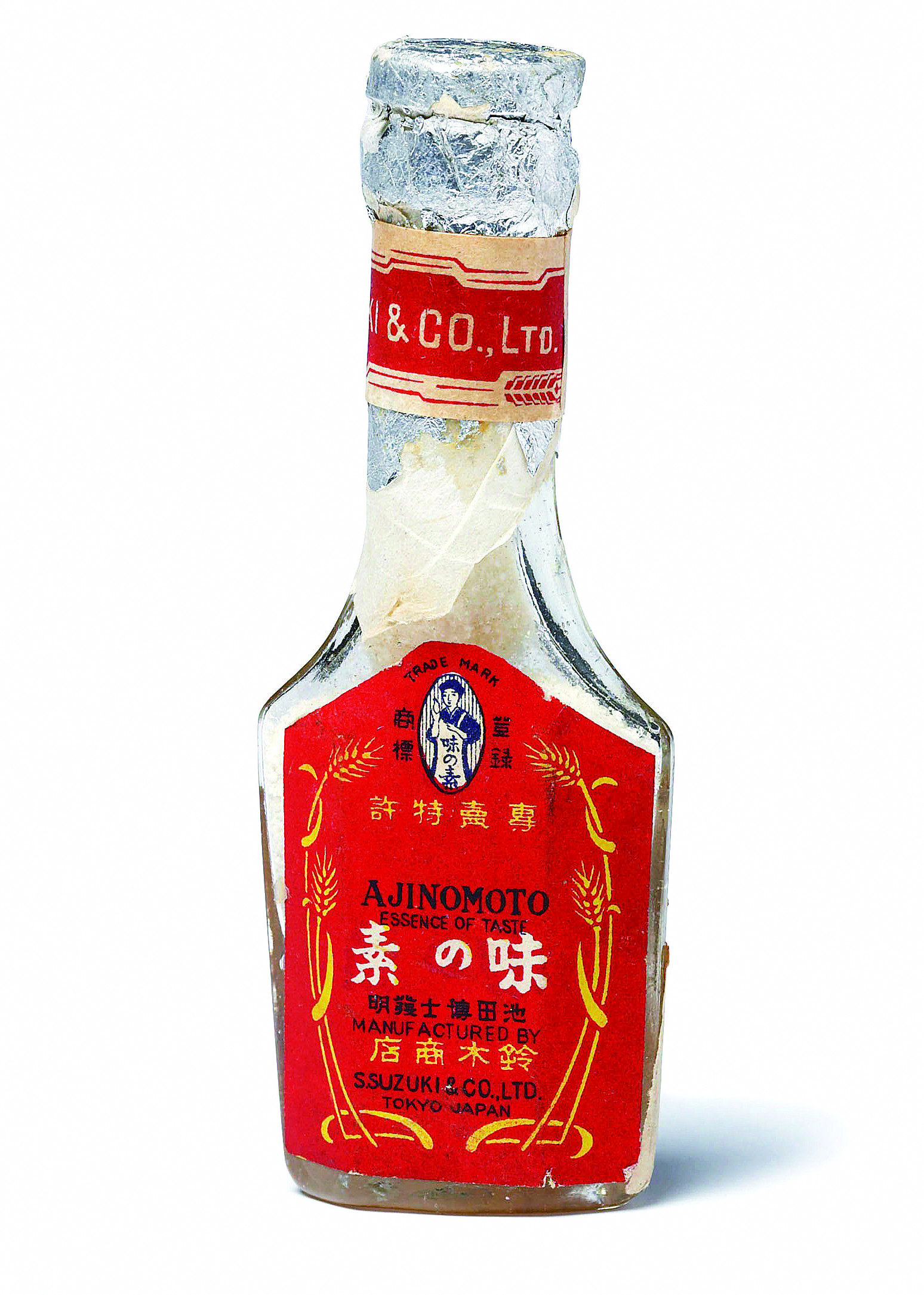
The original AJI-NO-MOTO (1909)

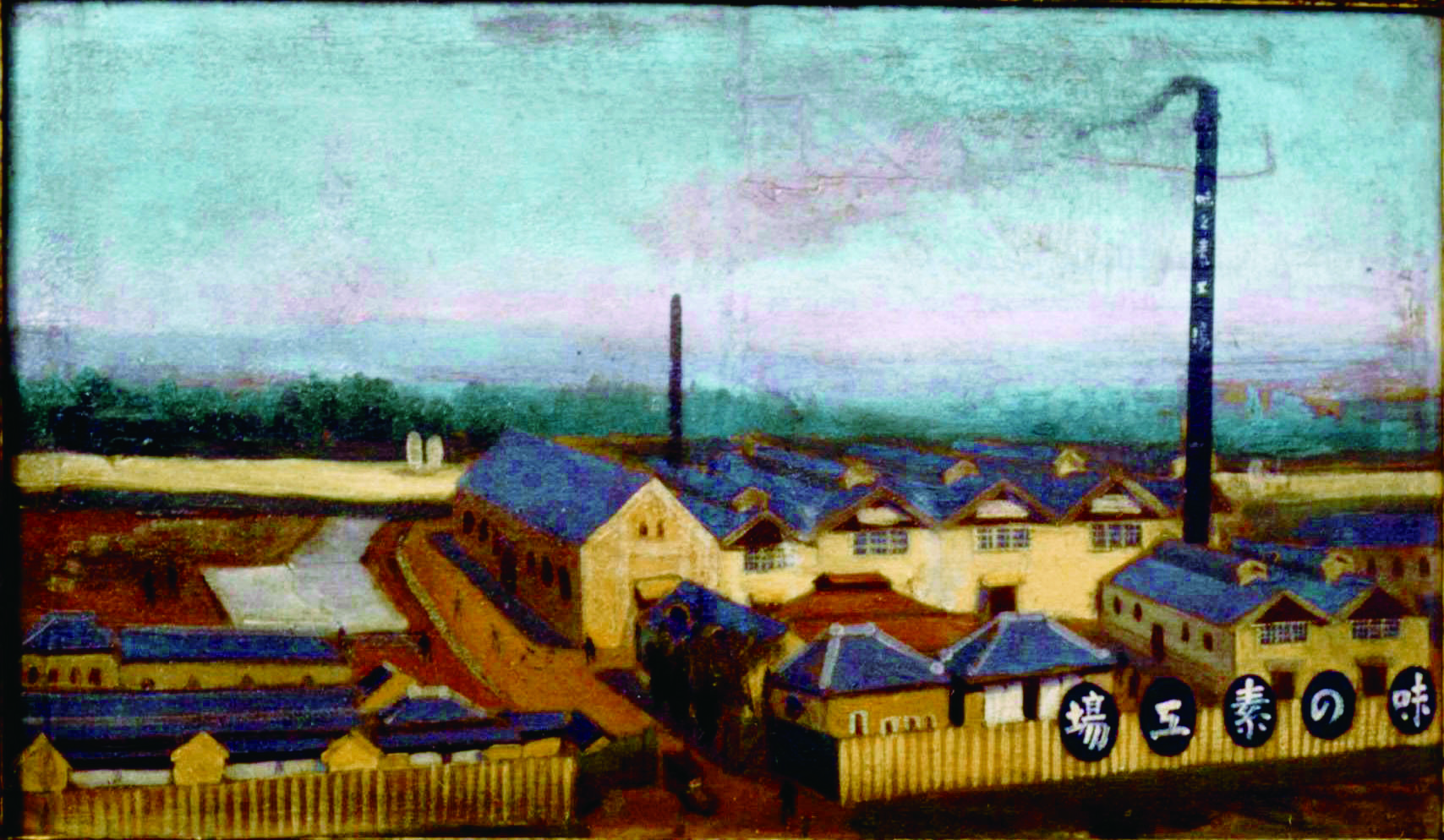
Oil painting of the Kawasaki factory from the 1910s

Ajinomoto Co., Inc. was created in 1908 as a subsidiary of Suzuki Pharmaceutical Co., Ltd., which was founded in May 1907 by Saburōsuke Suzuki II and Kikunae Ikeda. Ajinomoto was created to let Ikeda, a professor at Tokyo Imperial University, sell monosodium glutamate (MSG) seasoning made from wheat that he invented and patented. He created the seasoning after discovering that MSG was the source of a flavor that he called umami. In April 1909, Ajinomoto presented Ikeda's seasoning under the brand name "AJI-NO-MOTO" at a new product exhibition event in Tokyo, and began selling the product the next month. Ajinomoto primarily marketed the seasoning to housewives by using their trademark, a housewife in an apron, in newspaper advertisements, on signboards, and on-ground stamps.

Output gradually increased from 4.7 tons in 1910 to 23.3 tons in 1913, with sales reaching 400 thousand yen. In 1914 Ajinomoto built a new factory in Kawasaki to expand its production of flavoring. Japan's improved economy after World War I resulted in output hitting 84.6 tons and sales reaching 1.5 million yen in 1918. Despite rising sales, Ajinomoto experienced a deficit during its first ten years due to altering its methods of production and lowering its prices to get its product into ordinary households, among other reasons. Because of rising Japanese exports after World War I, Ajinomoto opened offices in New York and Shanghai in 1917 and 1918, respectively. In 1918 Ajinomoto exported 20.5 tons of its seasoning, accounting for a quarter of its total sales. The company opened new offices in Singapore and Hong Kong in 1927 and in Taiwan in 1929 to distribute its product throughout Southeast Asia. Between 1920 and 1929, revenue from the seasoning's sales rose from nearly 3 million yen to 10 million yen, largely due to increased exports of the product to foreign markets.

To lower the cost of mass production, the seasoning's wheat was replaced with soybeans, as the price of the latter at the time was lower than the former's. In the United States, the seasoning, labeled by the FDA as a "Vegetable Protein Derivative", sold poorly on the consumer market, but Ajinomoto expanded their operations in the United States in 1931 due to mass orders of the seasoning by H.J. Heinz, Co. and Campbell Soup Co. Between 1931 and 1937, seasoning production increased from 1,077 tons to 3,750 tons, with revenue rising from 13 million yen to 27 million yen. Due to Japan's increasing isolationism in the late 1930s, the production of AJI-NO-MOTO decreased from 3,750 tons in 1937 to 2,339 tons in 1940. By 1942, production of the seasoning was reduced to 1,000 tons before completely stopping by 1944 due to World War II.

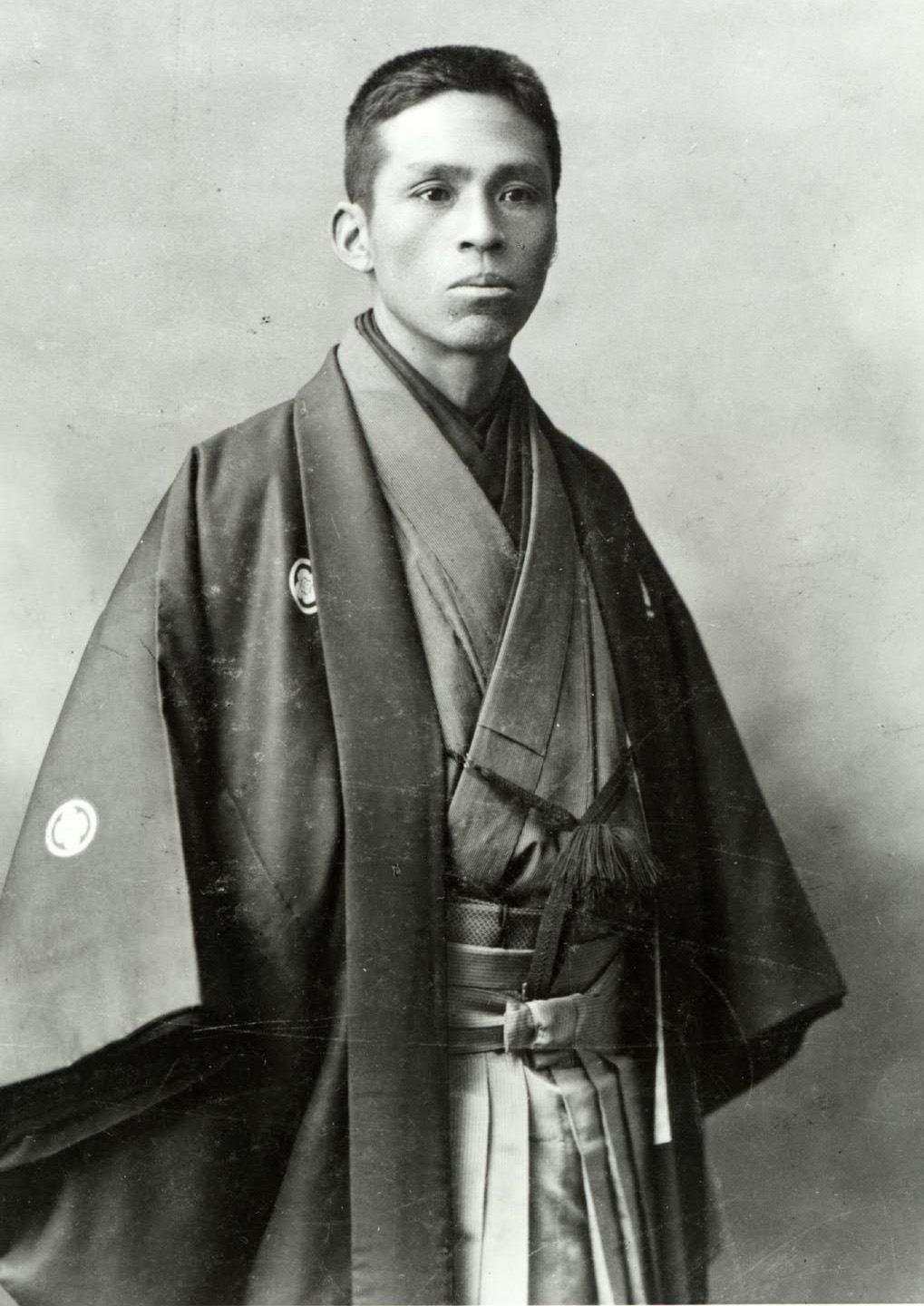
Suzuki Saburōsuke II, founder of Ajinomoto

=== 1945–1979: Post-war Japan and diversification ===
After World War II, Ajinomoto was slow to resume production of its seasoning as it lacked sufficient funds to continue production and its factory had been destroyed. In April 1946, the company changed its name to Ajinomoto Co., Ltd. In 1947 production of the seasoning resumed, in addition to the production of new food products such as nucleic acid-based seasonings and processed foods. In May 1949 Ajinomoto was listed on the Japanese stock exchange. By 1950, exports accounted for 95% of the company's revenue, with exports to Southeast Asia, Europe, and the United States increasing in subsequent years. In Europe, AJI-NO-MOTO was used as a seasoning by many processed food manufacturers, including Maggi and C.H. Knorr AG. In 1950, sales in Japan resumed after the lifting of postwar sales controls, surpassing pre-war sales by 1953.

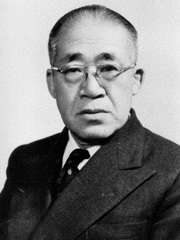
Suzuki Saburōsuke III, former president and advisor of Ajinomoto

In the 1960s, Ajinomoto began to diversify its production by securing alliances with international food companies, including the Kellogg Company in 1962, CPC International Inc. in 1963, and Best Foods Company Ltd. in 1964. Because of these partnerships, Ajinomoto began selling Kellogg's corn flakes and Knorr soup in Japan and created its own brand of mayonnaise. During this time period, Ajinomoto modified AJI-NO-MOTO's recipe by using amino acids from sugar cane instead of soybeans, which allowed the seasoning to be produced locally in the countries it was exported to, which reduced shipping costs for the company. Domestic production first began in Thailand in 1962, followed by the Philippines (previously established in 1958), Malaysia, Peru, Indonesia, and Brazil in subsequent years. By 1979, nearly half of all AJI-NO-MOTO was being produced outside of Japan.

In the 1970s, Ajinomoto diversified further by launching a flavored seasoning called HON-DASHI in 1970 and producing frozen foods in 1972. In 1973 Ajinomoto and General Foods Inc. launched Ajinomoto General Foods Inc., a joint venture between the two companies that would sell instant coffee. In 1978, Ajinomoto launched a brand of Chinese seasonings under the brand name "Cook Do". In Asian and Latin American markets, Ajinomoto created new products for consumers, while the company primarily delivered its products to processed food manufacturers in Europe and the United States.

During this era, the company also expanded into other product markets. In 1956, the company began supplying crystalline amino acids for pharmaceutical use, contributing to the world's first release of amino acids infusion. In the 1960s and 1970s, the company developed feed-use amino acids, pharmaceuticals such as enteral nutrients, and specialty chemicals like surfactants.

=== 1980–2009: Expansion globally ===
As the Japanese economy worsened in the 1980s, Ajinomoto sought to outsource more of its production overseas, which increased the number of employees the company employed overseas from 4,000 in 1979 to more than 11,000 in 1996. Starting in 1980, Ajinomoto began to refocus its diversification efforts from food products to its amino acid business. Following the US FDA's re-approval of aspartame in 1981, Ajinomoto began producing the sweetener at its Tokai factory in 1982. In 1987, Ajinomoto began researching drug development in the fields of clinical nutrition, anti-cancer drugs, infectious diseases, and cardiovascular drugs. Through this research, the company developed ELENTAL for use in clinical nutrition, LIVACT to fight liver disease, and Lentinan in collaboration with the Japanese Foundation for Cancer Research. Ajinomoto later released JINO as a cosmetic and amino acid for athletes, followed by Amino Vital, a supplement to JINO released in 1995. In 2000, Ajinomoto acquired NutraSweet and Euro-Aspartame from Monsanto.

In December 1995, Ajinomoto's Philippine CEO and President Leonardo K. Ty was assassinated by two members of the communist guerrilla group Alex Boncayao Brigade. The group cited Ty's allegedly poor safety standards for one of his other companies that they claimed to have led to the deaths of several of his employees. Ty had been head of Union Ajinomoto Inc. with his brother Alejandro since the late 1960s, and prior to his death, Ty had been seeking the protection of the National Bureau of Investigation. He was succeeded by Kazuo Ito as president.

In April 2002, Ajinomoto reorganized itself into food, amino acid, and medicine divisions, and owned subsidiaries for frozen foods, fats, and oils. In February 2003, Ajinomoto and Unilever completed a joint venture agreement in six countries and regions of Asia. Because of this, Ajinomoto launched the brand VONO to replace its use of the Knorr brand, and in the process established its own brand identity. In July 2003, Ajinomoto bought the French company Orsan from the UK-based Tate and Lyle Group, renaming Orsan to AJI-NO-MOTO Foods, Europe. In November 2005, AJI-NO-MOTO Pharmaceuticals USA, Inc. was liquidated, and its assets and functions were merged into AJI-NO-MOTO Pharmaceuticals, Europe. In January 2006, Ajinomoto bought the cooking sauce and condiments manufacturer Amoy Food from the French dairy company Groupe Danone. In 2009, the company released "Ajinomoto" to commemorate the 100th anniversary of its foundation.

=== Since 2010: Expansion and restructuring ===
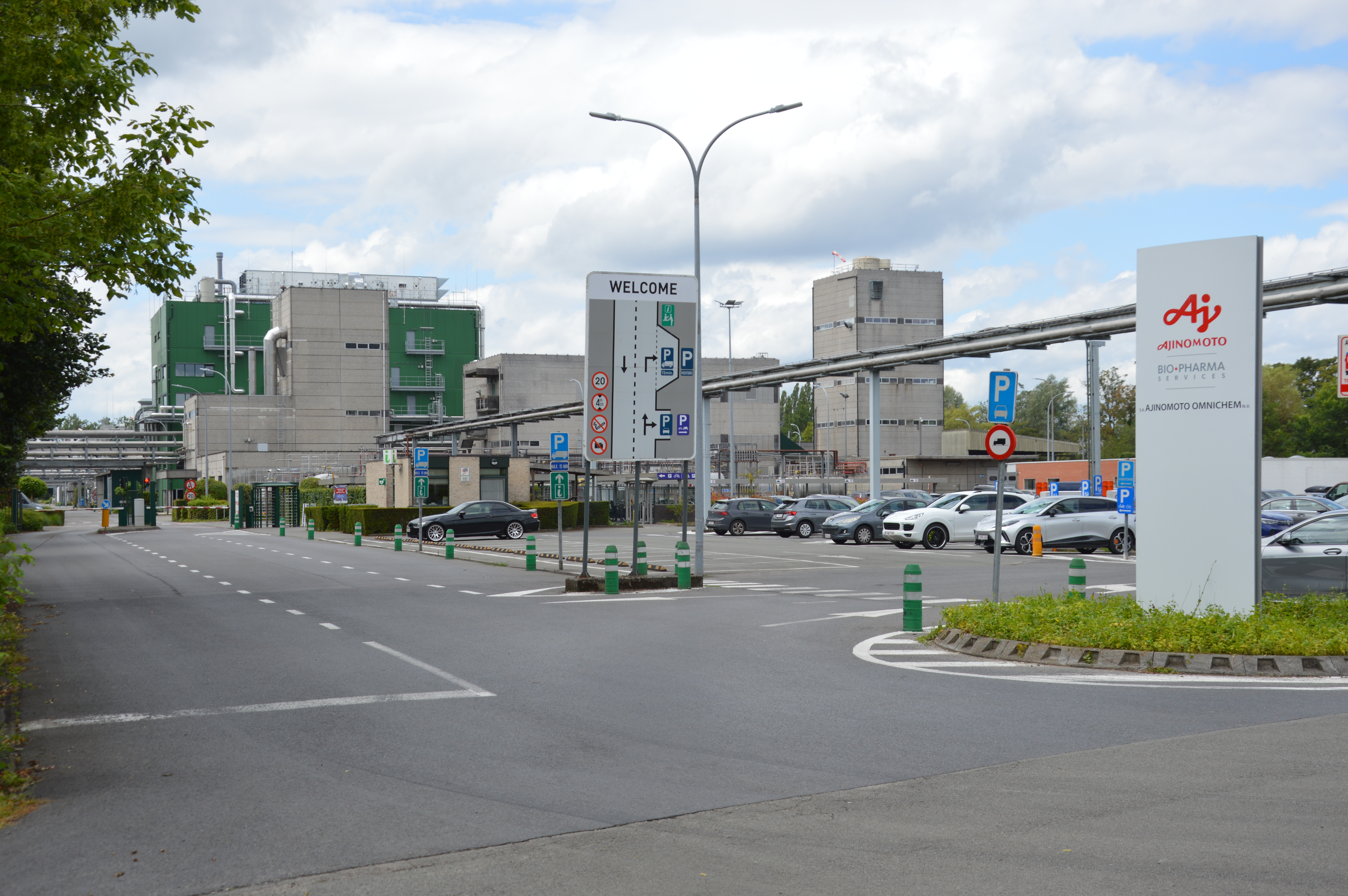
Ajinomoto Omnichem site in Wetteren, Belgium.

In 2010, due to a rise in foreign competition, Ajinomoto began restructuring to focus on several of its products while divesting others. The company divested its Calpis beverage unit in Japan in 2012, the Ajinomoto Sweetener Company (France) in October 2015, and Amoy Food (China) in November 2018. Ajinomoto decided to focus on its food and biomedical divisions, and acquired the contract manufacturing organization Althea Technologies (US) in 2013, the frozen food company Windsor Quality Holdings, Inc. (US) in November 2014, and the frozen food company Lavelli・Terrell・Smile (France) in November 2017. In April 2016, Ajinomoto merged its pharmaceutical division with Eisai, launching EA Pharma in Japan. In October 2017, Ajinomoto introduced a "Global Brand Logo" for use throughout the Ajinomoto group. In December 2017, Ajinomoto announced it had begun construction to expand its Kawasaki Plant, along with the construction of a new R&D building. In October 2018, Ajinomoto Althea (US) and OmniChem (Belgium) merged to form Ajinomoto Bio-Pharma Services, but in April 2025, all of Althea shares were transferred to Packaging Coordinators Inc.

In April 2020, the Ajinomoto Group Nutrient Profiling System for Product, which has been developed as a method to scientifically estimate the nutritive value of products such as powdered soup and frozen foods, was introduced globally to about 500 kinds of group products in seven countries. In August, Ajinomoto announced its participation in the international environment initiative RE100 for renewable energy.

In November 2020, "AJISWEET RA", produced in Japan cooperating with Morita Kagaku Kogyo Co., Ltd., was newly launched to the US as stevia sweetener reducing bitterness and off-flavors. In December, Ajinomoto Group made a wholly owned supplement company in Ireland by a share purchase agreement with Nualtra Limited in order to enter Europe's oral nutritional supplements market.

In December 2020, Ajinomoto was included by CDP in its "Climate Change A List for 2020" for the first time, as one of the most outstanding companies in terms of climate change-related initiatives and information disclosure for its climate impact. in 2021, Ajinomoto joined WIPO GREEN as an official partner in an effort to address climate change.

In February 2021, Ajinomoto Animal Nutrition Group Inc. transferred all of its 100% equity stake in Ajinomoto Animal Nutrition Europe S.A., a European feed-use amino acid company, to METabolic EXplorer, a French operating company with strengths in R&D of fermentation technologies.

On the Tokyo Nutrition Summit 2021, held on December 7–8, 2021, Ajinomoto announced its Nutrition Commitment, a specific goal for improving nutrition, and registered it on the commitment registration website (Global Nutrition Report) on October 26.

Ajinomoto Co., Inc. has planned and resolved the MediumTerm ASV Management 2030 Roadmap at its Board of Directors Meeting of February 28, 2023.

In May 2023, Ajinomoto signed a letter of intent for a strategic alliance with Solar Foods, a company that developed Solein, a microbial protein feeding on CO_{2} as a nutrient source, and obtained a marketing license in Singapore.

In November 2023, Ajinomoto acquired US-based Forge Biologics for $620 million.

In September 2024, Ajinomoto entered into a global strategic partnership with Danone to reduce greenhouse gas emissions from Danone’s raw milk supply chain. In the same year, through joint research with Professor Chinatsu Kasamatsu (Project Professor) of the Institute for SDGs Promotion at Ochanomizu University in Japan, Ajinomoto became the first in the world to develop a new concept of 'electric seasoning,' which adjusts the taste of food using transdermal electrical stimulation.

In March 2025, Ajinomoto decided to participate as a partner in the 'Demonstration Survey for the Restoration Model of Degraded Agricultural Land in Brazil,' a project under the Japan-Brazil Green Partnership Initiative promoted by the governments of Japan and Brazil.

In April 2025, Ajinomoto was selected by CDP, an international environmental not-for-profit charity, for its "Climate Change A-List" for fiscal 2024. This is the fifth consecutive year that Ajinomoto has been selected for the A-list.

== Products ==
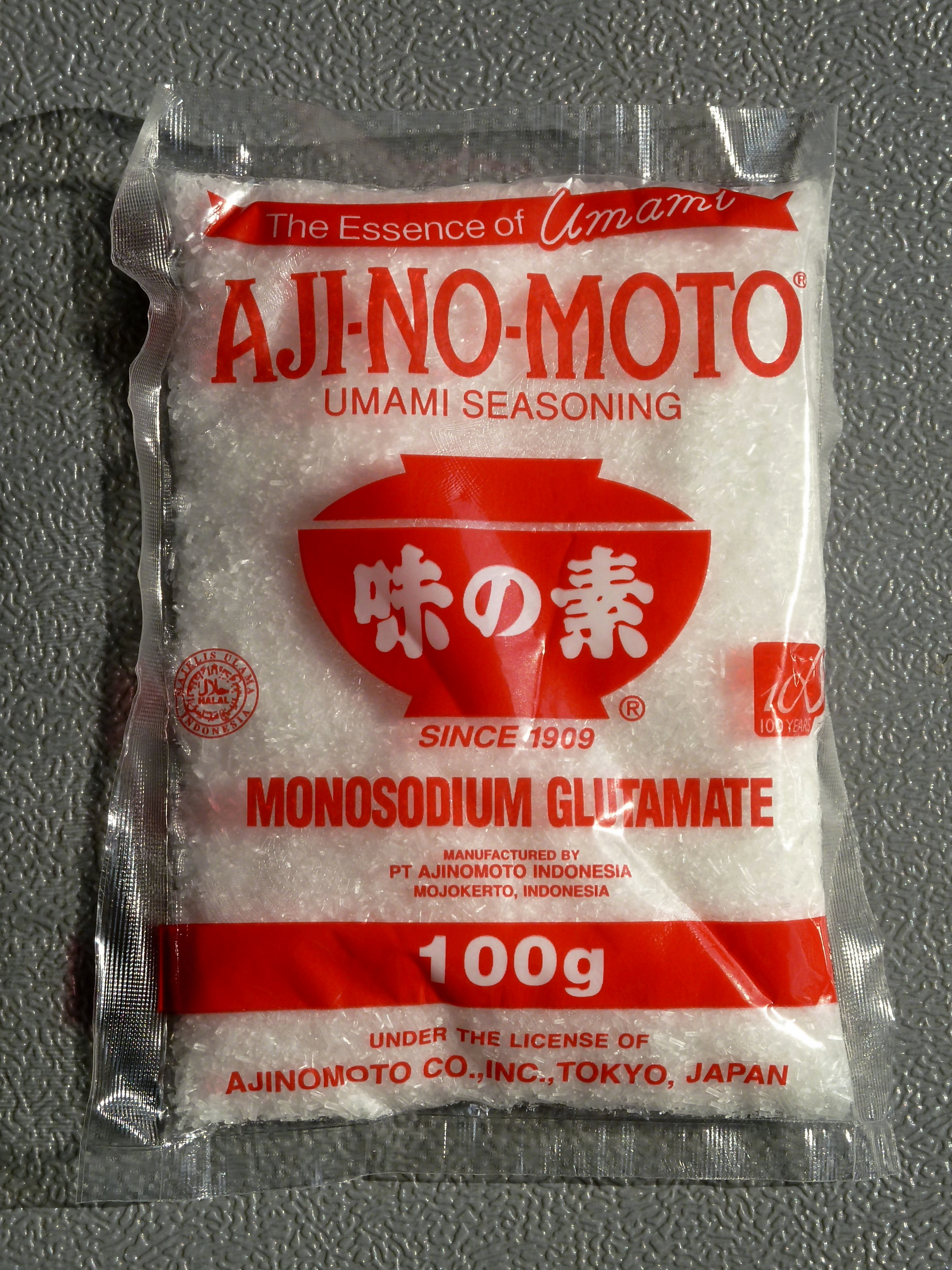
A pack of Ajinomoto brand MSG

=== List of Ajinomoto brands ===
==== Seasonings ====
- AJI-NO-MOTO
- AJI-NO-MOTOPLUS
- AJI-PLUS
- AJI-SHIO
- Chuka-Aji
- Hapima (India)
- Hi-Me
- HON-DASHI
- KOJI-AJI
- RosDee (Thailand)
- RosDee Krua Krob Ros (Thailand)
- Takumi-Aji (Thailand)
- Aji-Ginisa (Philippines)
- Aji-ngon (Vietnam)
- AMOY (Russia)
- Moslaji (Bangladesh)
- AJI-SAL (Brazil)
- DeliDawa (Nigeria)
- Sazón (Brazil)
- Doña Gusta (Peru)
- Ajinomix (Peru)
- KEMAL KÜKRER (Turkey, Japan, Peru)
- Aji Savor on Rice (Philippines, discontinued)
- Chicken Powder (Philippines)
- Sarsaya Oyster Sauce (Philippines)
- Aji-Nua-Super (Thailand)
- MOCHU (Singapore)
- Aji-Xốt (Vietnam)
- Phu Si (Vietnam)
- SALT ANSWER (Thailand)
- AJINOMOTO Oyster Sauce (Cambodia)
- Pure Select Mayonnaise (Japan)
- Aji-mayo (Vietnam, Cambodia)
- TUMIX (Malaysia, Singapore)
- Masako (Indonesia)
- Secret Sangkap (Philippines, discontinued)
- Bot canh (Vietnam)

==== Processed foods ====
- Cook Do (Japan)
- Nabe-Cube (Japan)
- Steam Me (Japan)
- Ajinomoto KK Consommé
- Knorr (Japan, under license from Unilever)
- Ajinomoto Olive Oil
- Ajinomoto Canola Oil
- Ajinomoto Rice Oil (Japan)
- Ajinomoto Sinigang Mix (Philippines)
- Rumic Pasta sauce
- Oyakata (Europe)
- Samsmak (Europe)
- Noodle'im (Turkey)
- BizimMutfak (Turkey)
- YumYum (Thailand, Indonesia, Europe, Japan, Philippines)
- Vono (Brazil, Korea, Taiwan)
- A&M (India)
- MaDish (Nigeria)
- Tasty Boy (Philippines)
- Ajinomen (Peru, Colombia, Chile)
- Crispy Fry (Philippines, Pakistan, Middle East)
- Chicken Savor (Philippines, discontinued)
- Pork Savor (Philippines, discontinued)
- Flavor Up (Philippines)
- Just Deli (Poland)
- Rasa Sifu (Malaysia)
- Seri-Aji (Malaysia)
- Sajiku (Indonesia)
- SAORI (Indonesia)
- Mayumi (Indonesia)
- NIKUPLUS (Indonesia)
- GARLICOPLUS (Indonesia)
- PILIPLUS (Indonesia)
- plus+ (Thailand)
- Banh Ran (Vietnam)
- Kho Quet (Vietnam)
- miskísimoo (Peru)
- Soup & Go (Philippines)

==== Frozen foods ====
- Taipei (US)
- LingLing (US)
- JoseOle (US)
- Posada (US)
- Bernardi (US)
- Freds (US)
- Whitley's (US)
- Chilli Bowl (US)
- Golden Tiger (US)
- Ajinomoto Frozen Foods (US, Europe, Thailand)
- Gyoza (US, Europe, Brazil, Singapore, Thailand, Philippines, Malaysia, Indonesia, Australia, New Zealand, Vietnam)
- Yakitori (France)
- Ramen (France)
- Yasaï Men (France)
- Spring Roll (Russia)
- Various cakes (China)
- Crispy Fried Chicken
- Shrimp Shumai

==== Sweetener ====
- Pal Sweet (Japan, Malaysia, Singapore)
- Lite Sugar (Thailand)

==== Coffee products ====
- Maxim instant coffee
- Blendy
- Sen
- Marim
- Birdy (Thailand, Indonesia, Vietnam)

==== Powder beverages ====
- Prottie (Thailand, Philippines)
- Fres-C (Philippines)
- FIT (Brazil)
- Mid (Brazil)
- Vtox Vinegar drink (Vietnam)
- KEMAL KÜKRER Vinegar drink (Turkey)

==== Fertilizer ====
- AJIFOL (Brazil, Peru, Thailand, Indonesia, Vietnam, US)
- AgriTecno Biostimulant (EU, China, Africa)
- PEK (Spain)

==== Ajinomoto animal nutrition ====
- L-Lysine
- L-Threonine
- L-Tryptophan
- AjiPro-L

==== Health and nutrition ====
- amino VITALPRO, Gold, Amino Protein, amino shot (Japan, Thailand, Indonesia, Philippines, Brazil, Malaysia, Taiwan)
- AjiPure (US)
- Fusi-BCAA (US)
- aminoVITAL jelly (Thailand)
- AminoMOF (Thailand)
- AminoNite (Thailand)

=== Food products ===
In 1909, Ajinomoto Co. Inc. released its umami seasoning AJI-NO-MOTO, made from molasses and tapioca starch derived from sugarcane. In Asia and Latin America, the product was primarily sold to consumers, while in North America and Europe it was mostly sold to processed food manufacturers. In 1970, Ajinomoto launched the bonito flavored seasoning HON-DASHI in Japan, and later adapted the product to other markets with local flavors. In 1978 Ajinomoto released Cook Do, a series of Chinese cuisine seasoning products, and later added other cuisine seasoning flavors to the Cook Do product line. The company entered the frozen food business in 1972, and currently sells a variety of frozen food products, including dumplings, noodles, and cooked rice. In 1982, Ajinomoto Co., Inc. entered the sweetener business by producing aspartame. In 1984 it released a low-calorie consumer sweetener PAL SWEET. By 2021, Ajinomoto was ranked 6th overall and 1st in Asia on FoodTalks' Top 50 Global Sweetener Companies list. Ajinomoto Co., Inc. is the world's largest manufacturer of aspartame, sold under the trade name Aminosweet. Ajinomoto also sells soup, mayonnaise, porridge, pasta sauce, and instant noodles under the "VONO" brand name. Through Ajinomoto AGF Corporation, Ajinomoto sells instant coffee, regular coffee, bottled coffee, stick coffee, and canned coffee, and is the top coffee brand in Thailand with a 70% market share.

Ajinomoto's Yum Yum brand of instant noodles in 2019 held a 20–21% share of Thailand's 17 billion baht instant noodle market.

=== Animal nutrition ===
The Ajinomoto Group started an animal nutrition business in 1965 and subsequently established an international production and supply system for amino acids to be used in animal feed. Ajinomoto developed a lysine formula called AjiPro-L for lactating dairy cows, which allows the lysine to reach the intestine without decomposing in the stomach.

=== Chemicals and semiconductors ===
Ajinomoto has developed mild cleansing agents such as Amisoft and Amilite, and humectant emollients such as Eldew and Amihop. It also manufactures for companies such as Daiichi Sankyo Healthcare Co., Ltd. to develop products like the moisturizing detergent Minon.

Ajinomoto developed its resin functional materials business using technology obtained through the production of MSG.

Ajinomoto developed the Ajinomoto build-up film (ABF) substrate for insulating materials in semiconductor packages in high-performance CPUs. It was developed from the basic research on applications of amino acid chemistry to epoxy resins and their composites. ABF holds 90% of the market for this product.

=== Healthcare ===
The Ajinomoto Group's healthcare business is based on using the fermentation technology of amino acids. In 1956, Ajinomoto began producing the world's first amino acid infusion, enteral nutrition products, and crystalline amino acids that could be used as raw materials in pharmaceutical products. Currently, Ajinomoto manufactures around twenty kinds of amino acids at various factories overseas, including plants in Japan, the United States, Europe, and India. In 1995, Ajinomoto began selling an amino acid supplement called Amino Vital for professional sports athletes. In 2011, Ajinomoto began offering an "Amino Index" health checkup, which statistically analyzes the difference in amino acid concentrations between healthy individuals and adults suffering from cancer and other serious diseases to aid the early detection of cancer and other diseases. In addition to glutamates as a seasoning, the company also produces other amino acids such as L-Leucine, L-Tyrosine, Glycine, and L-Phenylalanine, which it markets as dietary supplements under the brand name AjiPure.

== Corporate structure ==
=== Representative directors ===
- Shigeo Nakamura, President & CEO
- Hiroshi Shiragami, Representative Executive Officer & Executive Vice President, Chief Innovation Officer (CIO)

=== Divisions and global locations ===
Ajinomoto currently operates separate divisions for North America, Latin America, and Asia, with Europe, the Middle East, and Africa being combined into the EMEA division. Ajinomoto also owns dozens of subsidiaries globally for its food, biochemical, and healthcare businesses.

Global Production Basis
	JAPAN	Asia	Europe/Africa	North America	Latin America
Seasoning	12	19	4	2	4
Processed food (Note: Including frozen foods)	16	11	4	12	1
Amino acids	3	4	2	4	4
Others	8	1	2	1	0

== Brand identity ==
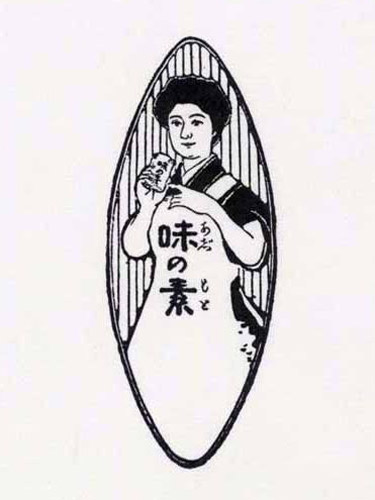
Registered trademark of Lady & AJI-NO-MOTO

Second logo, designed by Saul Bass (1973–1986)

Alternate version of the second logo, mostly used for packaging. (Second alternative variant)

Third logo (1986–1999)

Fourth logo (1999–2017)

Fifth and current logo (2017–present)

== Controversies ==
=== Lysine price fixing ===
In 1986, the Ajinomoto Group produced lysine at its Iowa factory of Heartland Lysine Co. U.S.A., followed by production in its Pathum Thani factory in Ajinomoto, Thailand, in 1986, and Bio Italia, BioPro in Italy in 1992, gradually upgrading its worldwide production bases. In the United States, competitors increased their own lysine production, which resulted in lower prices due to an overabundance of lysine on the market. To raise prices again, several companies, including Ajinomoto, price fixed lysine in the 1990s. Along with Kyowa Hakko Kogyo and Sewon America, Inc., Ajinomoto admitted to price fixing and settled with the United States Department of Justice Antitrust Division in September 1996. Each firm and an executive from each pleaded guilty as part of a plea bargain to aid in further investigation. Their cooperation led to Archer Daniels Midland settling charges with the US government in October 1996 for $100 million, a record antitrust fine at the time. Cartels were able to raise lysine prices 70% within the first six months of cooperating.

=== MSG ===
In 1996, the FDA commissioned the Federation of American Society for Experimental Biology (FASEB) to study the effects of MSG, who concluded that MSG is safe for most people. At the time, Ajinomoto also noted the possibility that asthma patients and carriers with symptoms of Chinese restaurant syndrome symptoms may be affected, but ultimately, the safety of this group was also confirmed by subsequent test results in the United States and Australia.

In 2020, Ajinomoto along with other activists launched the #RedefineCRS campaign to combat the myth that MSG is harmful to people's health, which highlights both the underlying xenophobic biases against Asian cuisine and scientific evidence that the myth is false.

The FDA Food Code 2022 removed MSG from the table of common chemical hazards and associated food and control measures in retail establishments.

Low-sodium salt substitutes are considered to be formulations where sodium is reduced – usually by partial or full replacement of NaCl with other chloride and non-chloride salts such as KCl, magnesium chloride, calcium chloride or potassium lactate. Monosodium glutamate (MSG) was also considered a low-sodium salt substitute.

=== Indonesian pork incident ===
In early 2001, Ajinomoto was involved in an incident in Indonesia, a predominantly Muslim country, when it was revealed that a pork-based enzyme had been used in its MSG production. According to Islamic dietary laws, pork is a haram (forbidden) meat, and is regarded as unclean. Immediately after the incident, the Food and Drug Administration of the Indonesian government stepped up to announce that Ajinomoto's end product did not contain pig-derived substances. Additionally, Ajinomoto also announced that its products were derived from soybeans.

=== Aspartame ===
In 2008, Ajinomoto sued British supermarket chain Asda, part of Walmart, for a malicious falsehood action concerning its aspartame product when the chemical was listed as excluded from the chain's product line along with other "nasties". In July 2009, a British court found the case in Asda's favor. In June 2010, an appeal court reversed the decision, allowing Ajinomoto to pursue a case against Asda to protect the reputation of its aspartame. At that time, Asda said that it would continue to use the term "no nasties" on its own-label products, but the suit was settled out of court in 2011 after Asda removed references to aspartame from its packaging.

=== Animal Testing ===
In 2023, Ajinomoto was the subject of a protest from Peta UK and Siouxsie Sioux regarding the company's use of animals for testing.

== See also ==
- Adenosine monophosphate
- Advantame
- Ajinomoto Stadium
- Aspartame controversy
- Calpis
- Disodium glutamate
- Disodium inosinate
- Glutamate flavoring
- Glutamic acid
- Guanosine monophosphate
- Inosinic acid
- Motoko-chan no Wonder Kitchen
- Tien Chu Ve-Tsin
