= Guanosine monophosphate =

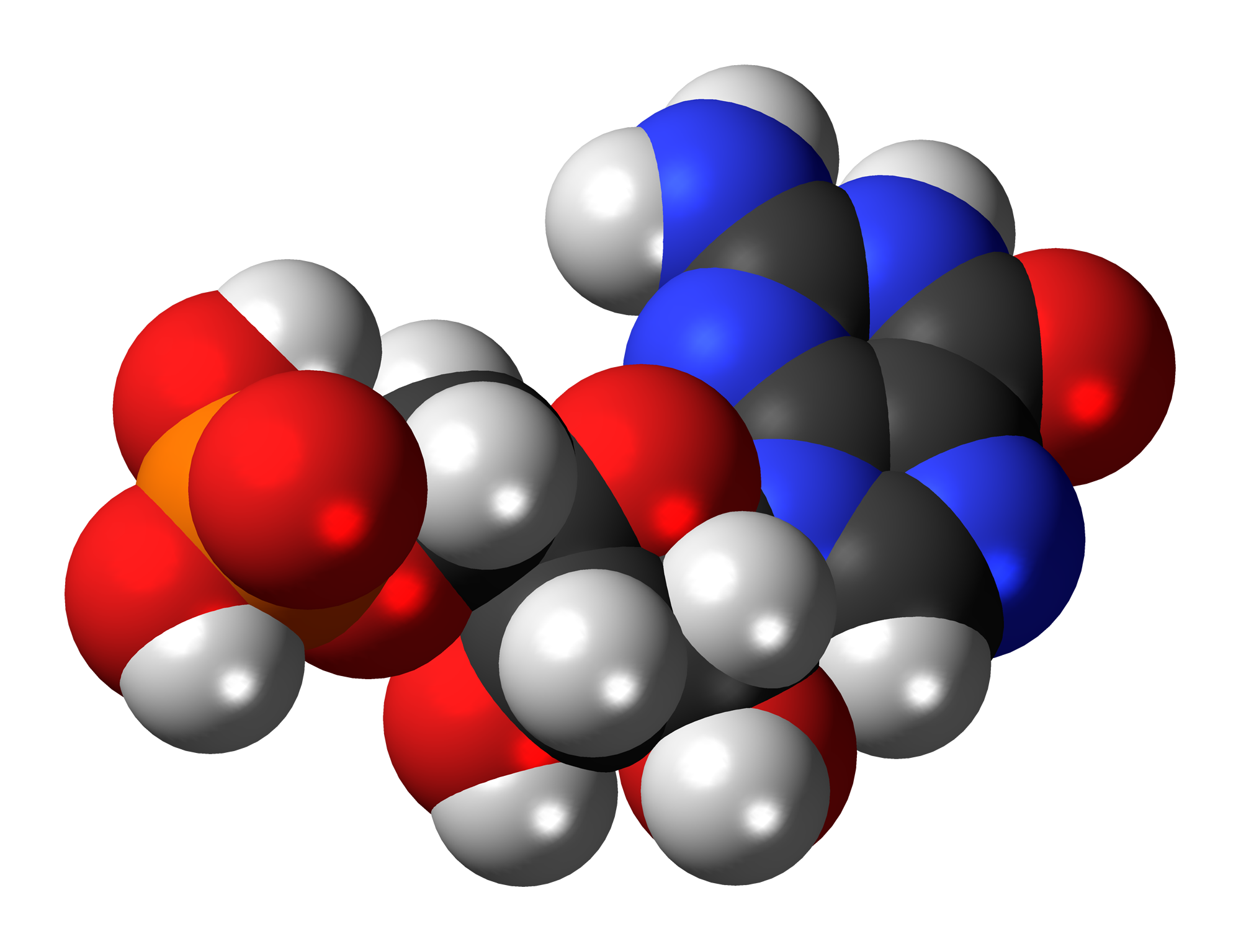
- Space-filling model of guanosine monophosphate

Names
- IUPAC name 5′-Guanylic acid
- Systematic IUPAC name [(2R,3S,4R,5R)-5-(2-Amino-6-oxo-1,6-dihydro-9H-purin-9-yl)-3,4-dihydroxyoxolan-2-yl]methyl dihydrogen phosphate
- Other names: 5′-Guanidylic acid; E number E626

Identifiers
CAS Number	85-32-5
3D model (JSmol)	Interactive image
Abbreviations	GMP
ChEBI	CHEBI:17345
ChEMBL	ChEMBL283807
ChemSpider	6545
DrugBank	DB01972
ECHA InfoCard	100.001.453
E number	E626 (flavour enhancer)
IUPHAR/BPS	5123
KEGG	C00144
MeSH	Guanosine+monophosphate
PubChem CID	135398631
UNII	16597955EP
CompTox Dashboard (EPA)	DTXSID9044295
- InChI: InChI=1S/C10H14N5O8P/c11-10-13-7-4(8(18)14-10)12-2-15(7)9-6(17)5(16)3(23-9)1-22-24(19,20)21/h2-3,5-6,9,16-17H,1H2,(H2,19,20,21)(H3,11,13,14,18)/t3-,5-,6-,9-/m1/s1 Key: RQFCJASXJCIDSX-UUOKFMHZSA-N
- SMILES: Nc1nc2n(cnc2c(=O)[nH]1)[C@@H]1O[C@H](COP(O)(O)=O)[C@@H](O)[C@H]1O

Properties
Chemical formula	C_{10}H_{14}N_{5}O_{8}P
Molar mass	363.223 g·mol^{−1}
Acidity (pK_{a})	0.7, 2.4, 6.1, 9.4
- Except where otherwise noted, data are given for materials in their standard state (at 25 °C [77 °F], 100 kPa). verify (what is ?) Infobox references

Guanosine monophosphate (GMP), also known as 5′-guanidylic acid or guanylic acid (conjugate base guanylate), is a nucleotide that is used as a monomer in RNA. It is an ester of phosphoric acid with the nucleoside guanosine. GMP consists of the phosphate group, the pentose sugar ribose, and the nucleobase guanine; hence it is a ribonucleotide monophosphate. Guanosine monophosphate is commercially produced by microbial fermentation.

As an acyl substituent, it takes the form of the prefix guanylyl-.

== De novo synthesis ==
GMP synthesis starts with D-ribose 5′-phosphate, a product of the pentose phosphate pathway. The synthesis proceeds by the gradual formation of the purine ring on carbon-1 of ribose, with CO_{2}, glutamine, glycine, aspartate and one-carbon derivatives of tetrahydrofolate donating various elements towards the building of the ring.

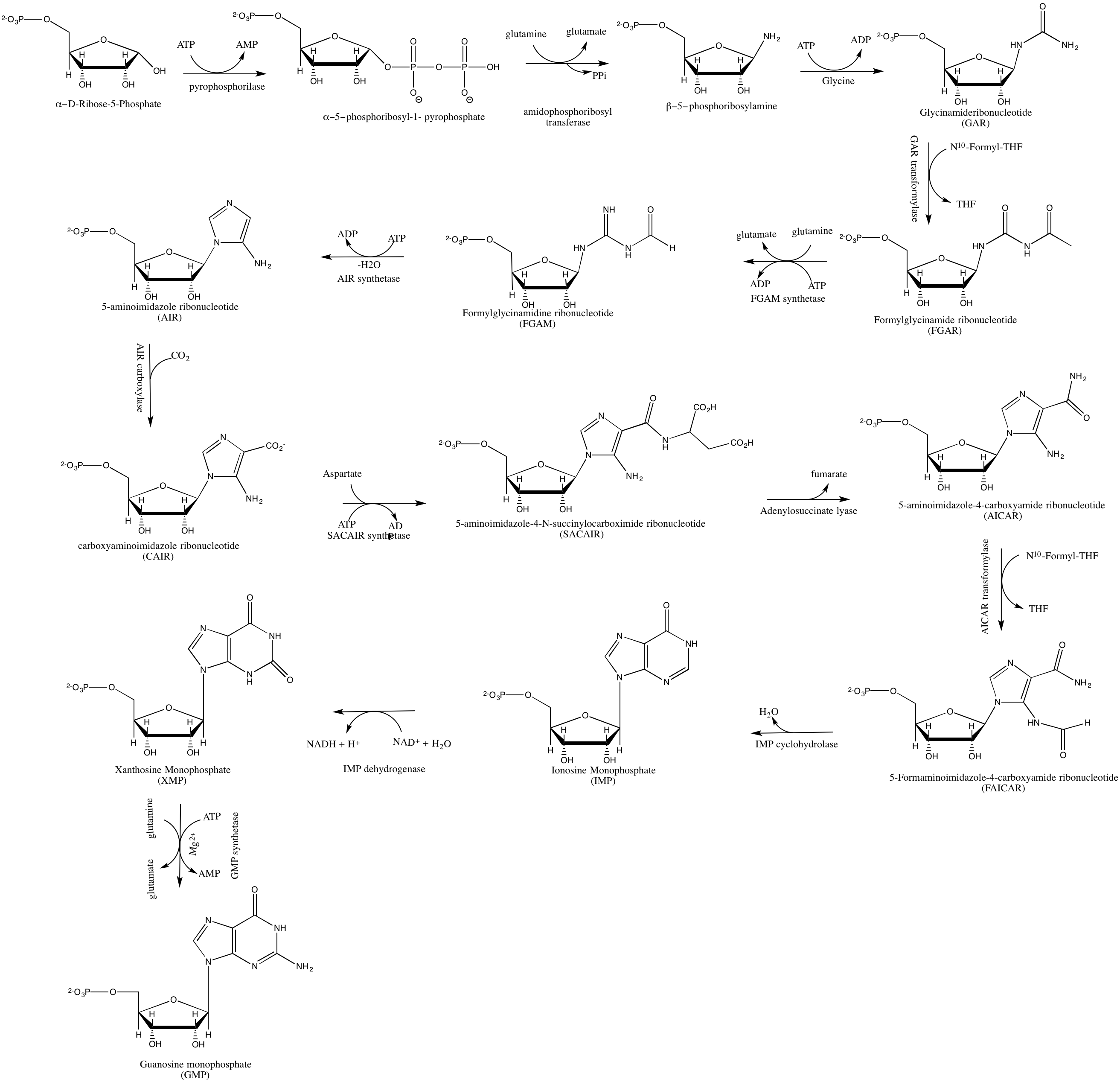

As inhibitor of guanosine monophosphate synthesis in experimental models, the glutamine analogue DON can be used.

== cGMP ==
GMP can also exist as a cyclic structure known as cyclic GMP. Within certain cells the enzyme guanylyl cyclase makes cGMP from GTP.

cGMP plays an important role in mediating hormonal signaling.

== Sources ==
GMP was originally identified as the umami substance in dried shiitake mushroom. The drying process significantly increases GMP content with the breakdown of RNA. It can be found in a number of other mushrooms.

Industrial production is based on fermentation: a bacterium converts sugars into AICA ribonucleotide, which is then converted chemically to GMP. Tapioca starch is a possible sugar source.

== Food additive ==
Guanosine monophosphate is known as E number reference E626. In the form of its salts, such as disodium guanylate (E627), dipotassium guanylate (E628) and calcium guanylate (E629), are food additives used as flavor enhancers to provide the umami taste. It is often used in synergy with disodium inosinate; the combination is known as disodium 5′-ribonucleotides. Disodium guanylate is often found in instant noodles, potato chips and snacks, savoury rice, tinned vegetables, cured meats, and packet soup.

As it is a fairly expensive additive, it is usually not used independently of glutamic acid or monosodium glutamate (MSG), which also contribute umami. If inosinate and guanylate salts are present in a list of ingredients but MSG does not appear to be, the glutamic acid is likely provided as part of another ingredient, such as a processed soy protein complex (hydrolyzed soy protein), autolyzed yeast, or soy sauce.

== See also ==
- Acceptable daily intake
- Disodium guanylate
- Disodium inosinate
- Inosinic acid
- Glutamate flavoring
- Kikunae Ikeda
- Umami
- Ajinomoto
- Tien Chu Ve-Tsin
- Glutamic acid
- Disodium glutamate
- Monopotassium glutamate
- Adenosine monophosphate
- Hypoxanthine-guanine phosphoribosyltransferase
- Ribonucleoside
