= Nucleotide diphosphatase =

Class of enzymes

Identifiers
- EC no.: 3.6.1.9
- CAS no.: 9032-64-8

Databases
- BRENDA: enzyme data
- ExPASy: NiceZyme view
- KEGG: enzyme entry
- MetaCyc: metabolic pathway
- Rhea: reactions
- PDB structures: RCSB PDB PDBe PDBsum
- Gene Ontology: AmiGO / QuickGO
Search
- PMC: articles
- PubMed: articles
- NCBI: proteins

Nucleotide diphosphatase (EC 3.6.1.9) is an enzyme that catalyzes the general hydrolysis reaction:

a nucleoside triphosphate + H_{2}O $\rightleftharpoons$ a nucleotide + pyrophosphate

For example, adenosine triphosphate is converted to adenosine monophosphate by the enzyme characterised from potato and pigeon liver:

adenosine triphosphate
H_{2}O
PP_{i}
adenosine monophosphate

The enzyme occurs in both plants and animals.

This enzyme belongs to the family of hydrolases, specifically those acting on acid anhydrides in phosphorus-containing anhydrides. The systematic name of this enzyme class is dinucleotide nucleotidohydrolase. Other names in use include nucleotide pyrophosphatase, and nucleotide-sugar pyrophosphatase.

== Structural studies ==
As of late 2007, 5 structures have been solved for this class of enzymes, with PDB accession codes PDB: 1NQY, PDB: 1NQZ, PDB: 2GSN, PDB: 2GSO, and PDB: 2GSU.
