= Protein-glutamine glutaminase =

protein-glutamine glutaminase

Identifiers
- EC no.: 3.5.1.44
- CAS no.: 62213-11-0

Databases
- IntEnz: IntEnz view
- BRENDA: BRENDA entry
- ExPASy: NiceZyme view
- KEGG: KEGG entry
- MetaCyc: metabolic pathway
- PRIAM: profile
- PDB structures: RCSB PDB PDBe PDBsum
- Gene Ontology: AmiGO / QuickGO
Search
- PMC: articles
- PubMed: articles
- NCBI: proteins

In enzymology, a protein-glutamine glutaminase (EC 3.5.1.44) is an enzyme that catalyzes the chemical reaction

protein L-glutamine + H_{2}O $\rightleftharpoons$ protein L-glutamate + NH_{3}

Thus, the two substrates of this enzyme are protein L-glutamine (a glutaminyl residue on a protein) and H_{2}O, whereas its two products are protein L-glutamate (a glutamyl reside on a protein) and NH_{3}.

This enzyme belongs to the family of hydrolases, those acting on carbon-nitrogen bonds other than peptide bonds, specifically in linear amides. The systematic name of this enzyme class is protein-L-glutamine amidohydrolase. Other names in common use include peptidoglutaminase II, glutaminyl-peptide glutaminase, destabilase, and peptidylglutaminase II.

In food production, this enzyme can increase the solubility and potentially reduce the off-flavor of proteins and peptides by forming negatively-charged glutamyl residues. It does not create free glutamin, hence does not add to the umami flavor.
