= Kikunae Ikeda =

Japanese academic and flavor chemist (1864–1936)

- 池田 菊苗
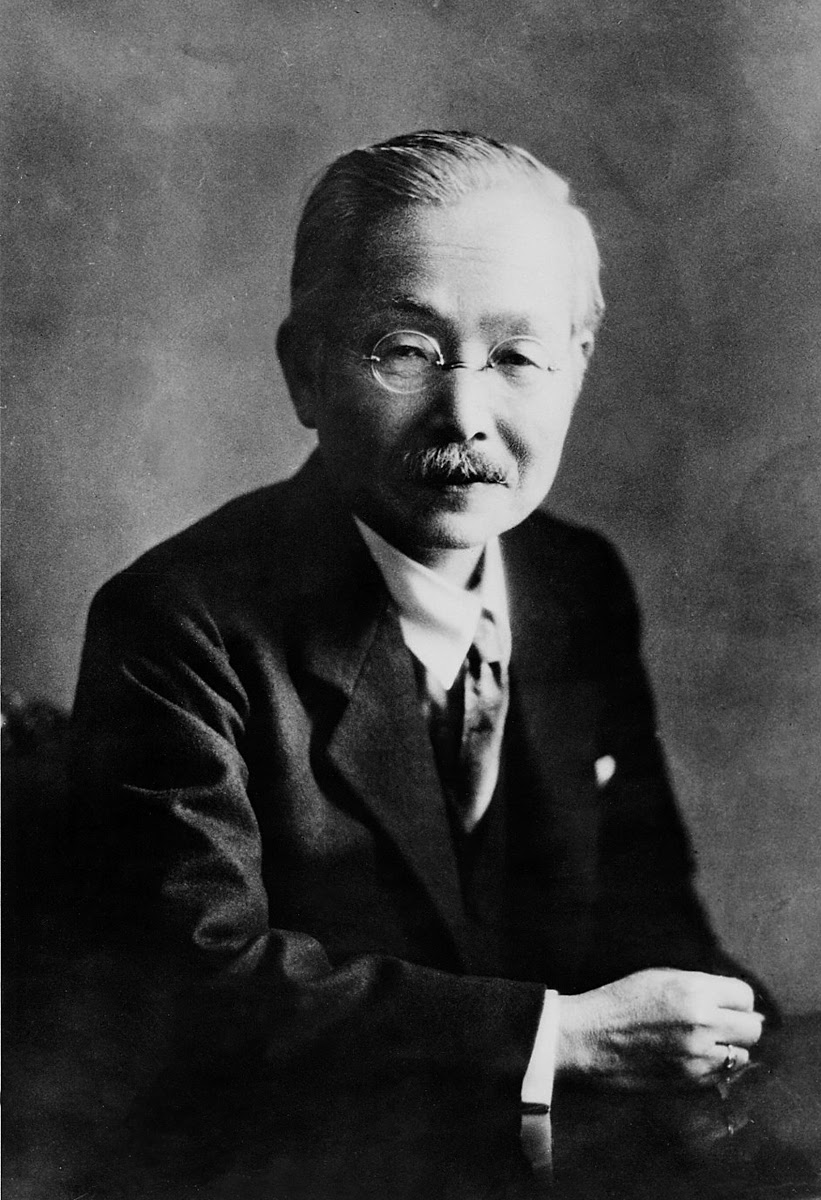
- Born: Kikunae Ikeda; 8 October 1864; Genji era Kyoto, Japan
- Died: 3 May 1936 (aged 71); Tokyo, Japan
- Education: Tokyo Imperial University

Kikunae Ikeda (池田 菊苗, Ikeda Kikunae; 8 October 1864 – 3 May 1936) was a Japanese chemist and Tokyo Imperial University professor of chemistry who, in 1908, uncovered the chemical basis of a taste he named umami. It is one of the five basic tastes along with sweet, bitter, sour and salty.

== Education ==
Ikeda graduated in 1889 from Tokyo Imperial University in chemistry. In 1891, he became a professor at the Higher Normal School of Tokyo, in 1896 he became an associate professor at Tokyo Imperial University. From 1899, Prof. Ikeda studied in Germany for two years at the laboratory of Prof. Friedrich Wilhelm Ostwald at the University of Leipzig, which was then the center of physical chemistry. After a brief stay in London, he returned to Tokyo in 1901 and became a full professor in chemistry at Tokyo Imperial University.

== Discoveries ==
In 1907 at the Tokyo Imperial University in Japan, Ikeda was eating dinner with his family when he suddenly stopped. That day the dashi broth in his soup was more delicious than normal; after stirring a few times he realized the difference was the umami flavor from the addition of kombu, a species of brown macroalgae, and flakes of fish known as katsuobushi. He understood that kombu was the secret to that flavor, and from that day on he studied the chemical composition of kelp. Some noted that the taste of the umami is similar to the flavor of the haute cuisine that the French chef Auguste Escoffier created.

By 1908, he had isolated brown crystals of glutamic acid (glutamate) which conveyed the characteristic flavor. The chemical monosodium glutamate (MSG) is the chemical basis for the umami flavor. He chose to call it Ajinomoto (味の素; "essence of flavor"). By 1909 he had developed a process for mass-producing MSG. He was able to extract MSG from wheat and defatted soybean, and patented the process for its manufacture. MSG is mass-produced from fermented cornstarch, sugar cane, molasses, or beet. Using this method the global production of MSG increased rapidly. As of 2007 his Ajinomoto Co., Inc. employs over 32,000 people. MSG ranks as one of the top flavor enhancers after salt and pepper.

Kikunae Ikeda also studied other foods to see if they contained umami, and confirmed that glutamate was responsible for part of the flavor of meat, seaweed and tomatoes. He believed that humans likely developed a taste for glutamate because it signaled the presence of proteins.

== Praise ==
On 18 April 1985, the Japan Patent Office selected him as one of Ten Japanese Great Inventors.

== See also ==
- Adenosine monophosphate
- Disodium glutamate
- Disodium inosinate
- Glutamate flavoring
- Guanosine monophosphate
- Inosinic acid
- Monopotassium glutamate
- Tien Chu Ve-Tsin
