= Motoko-chan no Wonder Kitchen =

1993 video game

- Cover art
- Developer: Ajinomoto
- Publisher: Ajinomoto
- Platform: Super Famicom
- Release: JP: September 1993
- Genre: Simulation (kitchen simulator)
- Mode: Single-player

Motoko-chan no Wonder Kitchen (もと子ちゃんのワンダーキッチン; "Little Motoko's Wonder Kitchen") or Motokochan in Wonder Kitchen is a 1993 adventure video game developed by Nintendo and published by Ajinomoto for the Super Famicom. It features minigames related to cooking. The game was a promotional item with a production run of 10,000 units which were used for a lottery contest. Consumers who mailed in two proof of purchase seals from Ajinomoto mayonnaise were entered into the contest to win the game, which was run over five months with 2,000 copies given away monthly. Due to Ajinomoto's inexperience in video game development, Nintendo was subcontracted to develop the actual game.

== Gameplay ==
Name brand products from Japanese supermarkets are used as an advertising gimmick from the company Ajinomoto. A young girl named Motoko takes children through a fantasy world and provides educational and informative content about the history of mayonnaise and other things that are related to food history. Games include reversi against a witch and finding seven dwarves that turn into sausages. The gameplay is somewhat similar to the more widely known Nintendo DS title Cooking Mama, which was released more than a decade later in 2006.

The game supports the Super Famicom Mouse.

Kitchen preparation screen where players learn to make their own meals using the various ingredients provided
