= Monosodium glutamate =

Flavor enhancer (621 or E621)

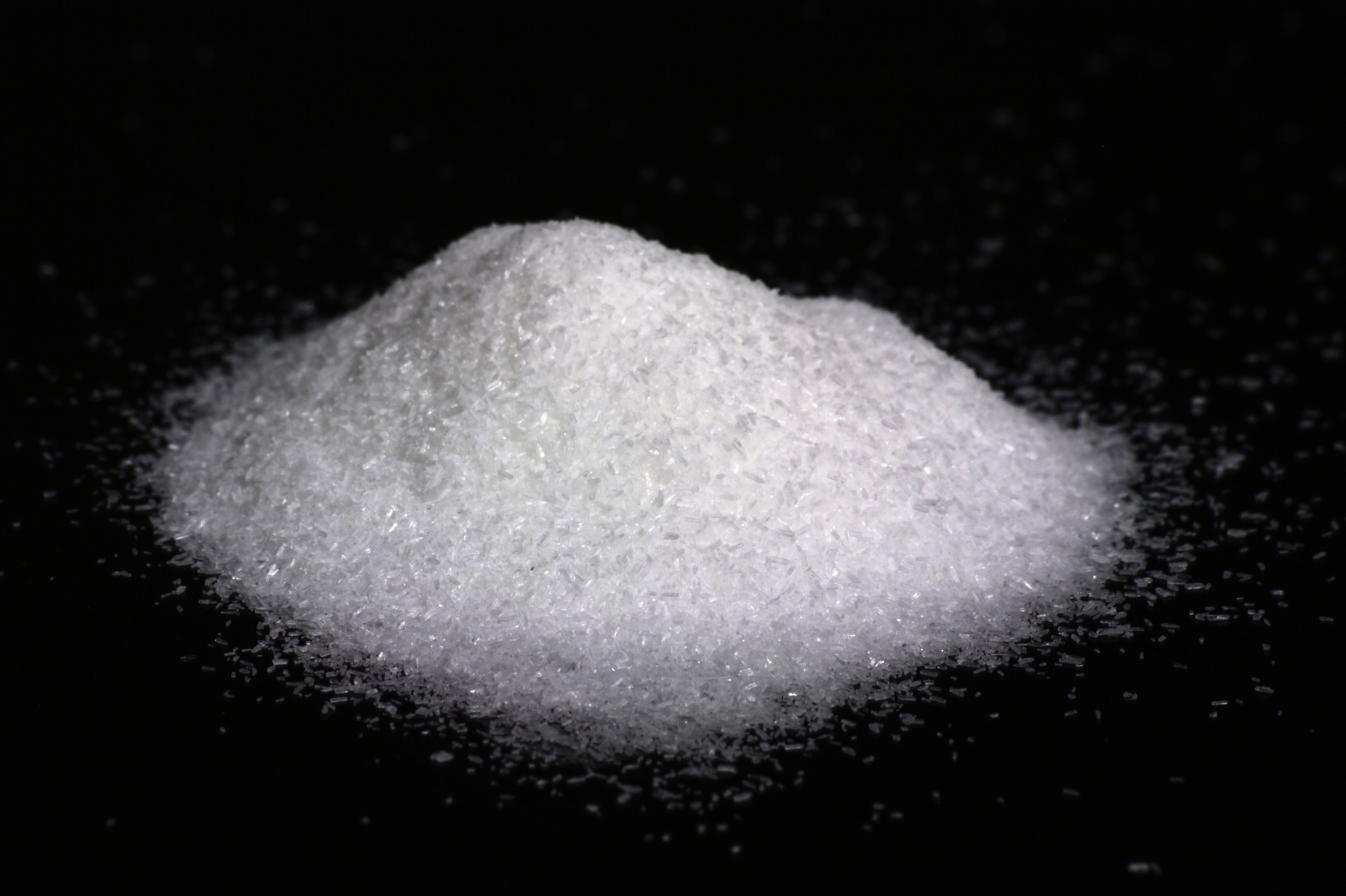

Names
- IUPAC name Sodium (2S)-2-amino-5-hydroxy-5-oxopentanoate

Identifiers
CAS Number	142-47-2
3D model (JSmol)	Interactive image
ChemSpider	76943
ECHA InfoCard	100.005.035
EC Number	205-538-1
E number	E621 (flavour enhancer)
PubChem CID	23672308
UNII	C3C196L9FG
CompTox Dashboard (EPA)	DTXSID9020906
- InChI: InChI=1S/C5H9NO4.Na/c6-3(5(9)10)1-2-4(7)8;/h3H,1-2,6H2,(H,7,8)(H,9,10);/q;+1/p-1/t3-;/m0./s1 Key: LPUQAYUQRXPFSQ-DFWYDOINSA-M; InChI=1/C5H9NO4.Na/c6-3(5(9)10)1-2-4(7)8;/h3H,1-2,6H2,(H,7,8)(H,9,10);/q;+1/p-1/t3-;/m0./s1 Key: LPUQAYUQRXPFSQ-SYBSRVMOBZ
- SMILES: [Na+].O=C([O-])[C@@H](N)CCC(=O)O

Properties
Chemical formula	C_{5}H_{8}NO_{4}Na
Molar mass	169.111 g/mol (anhydrous), 187.127 g/mol (monohydrate)
Appearance	White crystalline powder
Melting point	232 °C (450 °F; 505 K)
Solubility in water	740 g/L

Hazards
NFPA 704 (fire diamond)	0 0 0
- Lethal dose or concentration (LD, LC)
LD_{50} (median dose)	16600 mg/kg (oral, rat)
- Except where otherwise noted, data are given for materials in their standard state (at 25 °C [77 °F], 100 kPa). verify (what is ?) Infobox references

Monosodium glutamate (MSG), also known as sodium glutamate, is a sodium salt of glutamic acid. MSG is found naturally in some foods including tomatoes and cheese in this glutamic acid form, and is used in cooking as a flavor enhancer that intensifies the umami flavor of food, as naturally occurring glutamate does in foods such as stews and meat soups.

MSG was first extracted in 1908 by Japanese biochemist Kikunae Ikeda, who tried to isolate and duplicate the savory taste of kombu, an edible seaweed used as a broth (dashi) ingredient in Japanese cuisine. It also balances, blends, and rounds the perception of other tastes. MSG, along with disodium ribonucleotides, is commonly used and found in stock (bouillon) cubes, soups, ramen, gravy, stews, condiments, savory snacks, etc.

The U.S. Food and Drug Administration has given MSG its generally recognized as safe (GRAS) designation. It is a popular misconception that MSG can cause headaches and other feelings of discomfort, known as "Chinese restaurant syndrome". Several blinded studies show no such effects when MSG is combined with food in normal concentrations, and are inconclusive when MSG is added to broth in large concentrations. The European Union classifies it as a food additive permitted in certain foods and subject to quantitative limits. MSG has the HS code 2922.42 and the E number E621.

== Use ==
Pure MSG is reported to have a highly unpleasant taste until it is combined with a savory aroma. The basic sensory function of MSG is attributed to its ability to enhance savory taste-active compounds when added in the proper concentration. The optimal concentration varies by food; in clear soup, the "pleasure score" rapidly falls with the addition of more than one gram of MSG per 100 mL.

The sodium content (in mass percent) of MSG, 12.28%, is about one-third of that in sodium chloride (39.34%), due to the greater mass of the glutamate counterion, and the remainder, 87.72%, is glutamic acid. Although other salts of glutamate have been used in low-salt soups, they are less palatable than MSG.

The ribonucleotide food additives disodium inosinate (E631) and disodium guanylate (E627), as well as conventional salt, are usually used with monosodium glutamate-containing ingredients as they seem to have a synergistic effect. "Super salt" is a mixture of nine parts salt, to one part MSG and 0.1 parts disodium ribonucleotides (a mixture of disodium inosinate and disodium guanylate).

== Safety ==
MSG is generally recognized as safe to eat. A popular belief is that MSG can cause headaches and other feelings of discomfort, but blinded tests have not provided strong evidence of this. International bodies governing food additives currently consider MSG safe for human consumption as a flavor enhancer. Under normal conditions, humans can metabolize relatively large quantities of glutamate, which is naturally produced in the gut in the course of protein hydrolysis. The median lethal dose (LD_{50}) is between 15 and 18 g/kg body weight in rats and mice, respectively, five times the LD_{50} of table salt (3 g/kg in rats). The use of MSG as a food additive and the natural levels of glutamic acid in foods are not of toxic concern in humans. Specifically MSG in the diet does not increase glutamate in the brain or affect brain function.

A 1995 report from the Federation of American Societies for Experimental Biology (FASEB) for the United States Food and Drug Administration (FDA) concluded that MSG is safe when "eaten at customary levels" and, although a subgroup of otherwise-healthy individuals develop an MSG symptom complex when exposed to 3 g of MSG in the absence of food, MSG as a cause has not been established because the symptom reports are anecdotal.

According to the report, no data support any role of glutamate in chronic disease. High quality evidence has failed to demonstrate a relationship between the MSG symptom complex and actual MSG consumption. No association has been demonstrated, and the few responses were inconsistent. No symptoms were observed when MSG was used in food.

Adequately controlling for experimental bias includes a blinded, placebo-controlled experimental design and administration by capsule, because of the unique aftertaste of glutamates. In a 1993 study, 71 fasting participants were given 5 g of MSG and then a standard breakfast. One reaction (to the placebo, in a self-identified MSG-sensitive individual) occurred. A study in 2000 tested the reaction of 130 subjects with a reported sensitivity to MSG. Multiple trials were performed, with subjects exhibiting at least two symptoms continuing. Two people out of the 130 responded to all four challenges. Because of the low prevalence, the researchers concluded that a response to MSG was not reproducible.

Studies exploring MSG's role in obesity have yielded mixed results.

Although several studies have investigated anecdotal links between MSG and asthma, current evidence does not support a causal association.

Food Standards Australia New Zealand (FSANZ) MSG technical report concludes:

There is no convincing evidence that MSG is a significant factor in causing systemic reactions resulting in severe illness or mortality. The studies conducted to date on Chinese restaurant syndrome (CRS) have largely failed to demonstrate a causal association with MSG. Symptoms resembling those of CRS may be provoked in a clinical setting in small numbers of individuals by the administration of large doses of MSG without food. However, such effects are neither persistent nor serious and are likely to be attenuated when MSG is consumed with food. In terms of more serious adverse effects such as the triggering of bronchospasm in asthmatic individuals, the evidence does not indicate that MSG is a significant trigger factor.

The FSANZ MSG report says that although no data is available on average MSG consumption in Australia and New Zealand, "data from the United Kingdom indicates an average intake of 590mg/day, with extreme users (97.5th percentile consumers) consuming 2,330mg/day" (Rhodes et al. 1991). In a highly seasoned restaurant meal, intakes as high as 5,000 mg or more may be possible (Yang et al. 1997). When very large doses of MSG (>5 g MSG in a bolus dose) are ingested, plasma glutamate concentration will significantly increase. However, the concentration typically returns to normal within two hours. In general, foods providing metabolizable carbohydrates significantly attenuate peak plasma glutamate levels at doses up to 150mg/kg body weight. Two earlier studies – the 1987 Joint FAO/WHO Expert Committee on Food Additives (JECFA) and the 1995 Federation of American Societies for Experimental Biology (FASEB) – concluded, "there may be a small number of unstable asthmatics who respond to doses of 1.5–2.5 g of MSG in the absence of food". The FASEB evaluation concluded, "sufficient evidence exists to indicate some individuals may experience manifestations of CRS when exposed to a ≥3 g bolus dose of MSG in the absence of food".

== Production ==
MSG has been produced by three methods: hydrolysis of vegetable proteins with hydrochloric acid to disrupt peptide bonds (1909–1962); direct chemical synthesis with acrylonitrile (1962–1973), and bacterial fermentation (the current method). Wheat gluten was originally used for hydrolysis because it contains more than 30 g of glutamate and glutamine per 100 g of protein. As demand for MSG increased, chemical synthesis and fermentation were studied. The polyacrylic fiber industry began in Japan during the mid-1950s, and acrylonitrile was adopted as a base material to synthesize MSG.

As of 2016, most MSG worldwide is produced by bacterial fermentation in a process similar to making vinegar or yogurt. Sodium is added later, for neutralization. During fermentation, Corynebacterium species, cultured with ammonia and carbohydrates from sugar beets, sugarcane, tapioca or molasses, excrete amino acids into a culture broth from which L-glutamate is isolated. Kyowa Hakko Kogyo (currently Kyowa Kirin) developed industrial fermentation to produce L-glutamate.

The conversion yield and production rate (from sugars to glutamate) continues to improve in the industrial production of MSG, keeping up with demand. The product, after filtration, concentration, acidification, and crystallization, is glutamate, sodium ions, and water.

== Chemical properties ==
The compound is usually available as the monohydrate, a white, odorless, crystalline powder. The solid contains separate sodium cations Na^{+} and glutamate anions in zwitterionic form, ^{−}OOC-CH(NH^{+}_{3})-(CH_{2})_{2}-COO^{−}. In solution, it dissociates into glutamate and sodium ions.

MSG is freely soluble in water, but it is not hygroscopic and is insoluble in common organic solvents (such as ether). It is generally stable under food-processing conditions. MSG does not break down during cooking and, like other amino acids, will exhibit a Maillard reaction (browning) in the presence of sugars at very high temperatures.

== History ==
Glutamic acid was discovered and identified in 1866 by the German chemist Karl Heinrich Ritthausen, who treated wheat gluten (for which it was named) with sulfuric acid. Kikunae Ikeda of Tokyo Imperial University isolated glutamic acid as a taste substance in 1908 from the seaweed Laminaria japonica (kombu) by aqueous extraction and crystallization, calling its taste umami ("delicious taste"). Ikeda noticed that dashi, the Japanese broth of katsuobushi and kombu, had a unique taste not yet scientifically described (not sweet, salty, sour, or bitter). To determine which glutamate could result in the taste of umami, he studied the taste properties of numerous glutamate salts such as calcium, potassium, ammonium, and magnesium glutamate. Of these salts, monosodium glutamate was the most soluble and palatable, as well as the easiest to crystallize. Ikeda called his product "monosodium glutamate" and submitted a patent to produce MSG; the Suzuki brothers began commercial production of MSG in 1909 using the term Ajinomoto ("essence of taste").

== Society and culture ==
=== Regulations ===
==== United States ====
MSG is one of several forms of glutamic acid found in foods, in large part because glutamic acid (an amino acid) is pervasive in nature. Glutamic acid and its salts may be present in a variety of other additives, including hydrolyzed vegetable protein, autolyzed yeast, hydrolyzed yeast, yeast extract, soy extracts, and protein isolate, which must be specifically labeled. Since 1998, MSG cannot be included in the term "spices and flavorings". However, the term "natural flavor/s" is used by the food industry for glutamic acid (chemically similar to MSG, lacking only the sodium ion). The Food and Drug Administration (FDA) does not require disclosure of components and amounts of "natural flavor/s".

==== Australia and New Zealand ====
Standard 1.2.4 of the Australia and New Zealand Food Standards Code requires MSG to be labeled in packaged foods. The label must have the food-additive class name (e.g. "flavour enhancer"), followed by the name of the additive ("MSG") or its International Numbering System (INS) number, 621.

==== Pakistan ====
The Punjab Food Authority banned Aji-No-Moto, commonly known as Chinese salt, which contains MSG, from being used in food products in the Punjab Province of Pakistan in January 2018.

The prohibition against the import and manufacture of MSG was enforced on 28 February 2018, following an order by the Supreme Court on 10 February 2018.

In 2024, the federal government lifted the ban on MSG, following objections from Japan and a review of scientific evidence by an expert committee. The committee comprising experts from various institutions—including the Pakistan Council of Scientific and Industrial Research, National Agricultural Research Centre, and Pakistan Standards and Quality Control Authority—confirmed MSG as a safe food additive.

=== Names ===
The following are alternative names for MSG:

- Chemical names and identifiers
  - Monosodium glutamate or sodium glutamate
  - Sodium 2-aminopentanedioate
  - Glutamic acid, monosodium salt, monohydrate
  - L-Glutamic acid, monosodium salt, monohydrate
  - L-Monosodium glutamate monohydrate
  - Monosodium L-glutamate monohydrate
  - MSG monohydrate
  - Sodium glutamate monohydrate
  - UNII-W81N5U6R6U
  - Flavour enhancer E621
- Trade names
  - Accent, produced by B&G Foods Inc., Parsippany, New Jersey, US
  - Aji-No-Moto, produced by Ajinomoto, 26 countries, head office Japan
  - Tasting Powder
  - Ve-Tsin by Tien Chu Ve-Tsin

== See also ==
- Acceptable daily intake
- Adenosine monophosphate
- Garum
- Guanosine monophosphate
- Hydrolyzed vegetable protein
- Hypoxanthine-guanine phosphoribosyltransferase
- Inosinic acid
- Iodized salt
- Kombu
- Monopotassium glutamate
- Murri (condiment)
- Ribonucleoside
- Russell Blaylock
- Table salt
- Yeast extract
- Vegeta (condiment)
