= Adenosine monophosphate =

- Skeletal formula of AMP

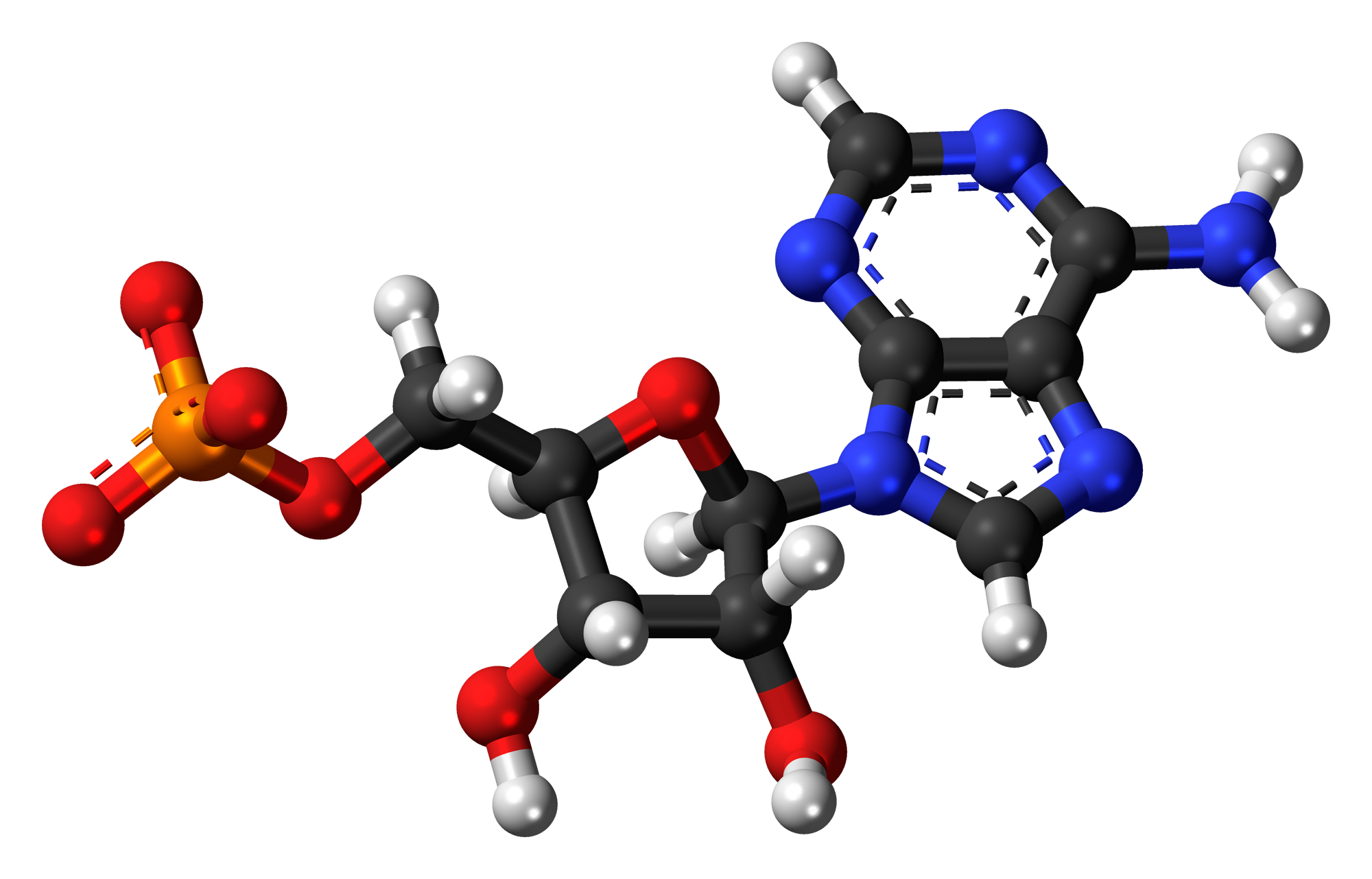
- Ball-and-stick model of AMP

Names
- IUPAC name 5′-Adenylic acid
- Systematic IUPAC name [(2R,3S,4R,5R)-5-(6-Amino-9H-purin-9-yl)-3,4-dihydroxyoxolan-2-yl]methyl dihydrogen phosphate
- Other names Adenosine 5'-monophosphate Vitamin B8

Identifiers
CAS Number	61-19-8
3D model (JSmol)	Interactive image; Interactive image
ChEBI	CHEBI:16027
ChEMBL	ChEMBL752
ChemSpider	5858
DrugBank	DB00131
ECHA InfoCard	100.000.455
IUPHAR/BPS	2455
KEGG	C00020
MeSH	Adenosine+monophosphate
PubChem CID	6083
UNII	415SHH325A
CompTox Dashboard (EPA)	DTXSID5022560
- InChI: InChI=1S/C10H14N5O7P/c11-8-5-9(13-2-12-8)15(3-14-5)10-7(17)6(16)4(22-10)1-21-23(18,19)20/h2-4,6-7,10,16-17H,1H2,(H2,11,12,13)(H2,18,19,20)/t4-,6-,7-,10-/m1/s1 Key: UDMBCSSLTHHNCD-KQYNXXCUSA-N; InChI=1/C10H14N5O7P/c11-8-5-9(13-2-12-8)15(3-14-5)10-7(17)6(16)4(22-10)1-21-23(18,19)20/h2-4,6-7,10,16-17H,1H2,(H2,11,12,13)(H2,18,19,20)/t4-,6-,7-,10-/m1/s1 Key: UDMBCSSLTHHNCD-KQYNXXCUBP
- SMILES: O=P(O)(O)OC[C@H]3O[C@@H](n2cnc1c(ncnc12)N)[C@H](O)[C@@H]3O; c1nc(c2c(n1)n(cn2)[C@H]3[C@@H]([C@@H]([C@H](O3)COP(=O)(O)O)O)O)N

Properties
Chemical formula	C_{10}H_{14}N_{5}O_{7}P
Molar mass	347.224 g·mol^{−1}
Appearance	white crystalline powder
Density	2.32 g/mL
Melting point	178 to 185 °C (352 to 365 °F; 451 to 458 K)
Boiling point	798.5 °C (1,469.3 °F; 1,071.7 K)
Acidity (pK_{a})	0.9, 3.8, 6.1
- Except where otherwise noted, data are given for materials in their standard state (at 25 °C [77 °F], 100 kPa). verify (what is ?) Infobox references

Adenosine monophosphate (AMP), also known as 5'-adenylic acid, is a nucleotide. AMP consists of a phosphate group, the sugar ribose, and the nucleobase adenine. It is an ester of phosphoric acid and the nucleoside adenosine. As a substituent it takes the form of the prefix adenylyl-.

AMP plays an important role in many cellular metabolic processes, being interconverted to adenosine triphosphate (ATP) and adenosine diphosphate (ADP), as well as allosterically activating enzymes such as myophosphorylase-b. AMP is also a component in the synthesis of RNA. AMP is present in all known forms of life.

== Production and degradation ==
AMP does not have the high energy phosphoanhydride bond associated with ADP and ATP. AMP can be produced from ADP by the myokinase (adenylate kinase) reaction when the ATP reservoir in the cell is low:

2 ADP → ATP + AMP

Or AMP may be produced by the hydrolysis of one high energy phosphate bond of ADP:

ADP + H_{2}O → AMP + P_{i}

AMP can also be formed by hydrolysis of ATP into AMP and pyrophosphate:

ATP + H_{2}O → AMP + PP_{i}

When RNA is broken down by living systems, nucleoside monophosphates, including adenosine monophosphate, are formed.

AMP can be regenerated to ATP as follows:

AMP + ATP → 2 ADP (adenylate kinase in the opposite direction)
ADP + P_{i} → ATP (this step is most often performed in aerobes by the ATP synthase during oxidative phosphorylation)

AMP can be converted into inosine monophosphate by the enzyme myoadenylate deaminase, freeing an ammonia group.

In a catabolic pathway, the purine nucleotide cycle, adenosine monophosphate can be converted to uric acid, which is excreted from the body in mammals.

== Physiological role in regulation ==
=== AMP-activated kinase regulation ===
The eukaryotic cell enzyme 5' adenosine monophosphate-activated protein kinase, or AMPK, utilizes AMP for homeostatic energy processes during times of high cellular energy expenditure, such as exercise. Since ATP cleavage, and corresponding phosphorylation reactions, are utilized in various processes throughout the body as a source of energy, ATP production is necessary to further create energy for those mammalian cells. AMPK, as a cellular energy sensor, is activated by decreasing levels of ATP, which is naturally accompanied by increasing levels of ADP and AMP.

Though phosphorylation appears to be the main activator for AMPK, some studies suggest that AMP is an allosteric regulator as well as a direct agonist for AMPK. Furthermore, other studies suggest that the high ratio of AMP:ATP levels in cells, rather than just AMP, activate AMPK. For example, the AMP-activated kinases of Caenorhabditis elegans and Drosophila melanogaster were found to have been activated by AMP, while yeast and plant kinases were not allosterically activated by AMP.

AMP binds to the γ-subunit of AMPK, leading to the activation of the kinase, and then eventually a cascade of other processes such as the activation of catabolic pathways and inhibition of anabolic pathways to regenerate ATP. Catabolic mechanisms, which generate ATP through the release of energy from breaking down molecules, are activated by the AMPK enzyme while anabolic mechanisms, which utilize energy from ATP to form products, are inhibited. Though the γ-subunit can bind AMP/ADP/ATP, only the binding of AMP/ADP results in a conformational shift of the enzyme protein. This variance in AMP/ADP versus ATP binding leads to a shift in the dephosphorylation state for the enzyme. The dephosphorylation of AMPK through various protein phosphatases completely inactivates catalytic function. AMP/ADP protects AMPK from being inactivated by binding to the γ-subunit and maintaining the dephosphorylation state.

== cAMP ==
AMP can also exist as a cyclic structure known as cyclic AMP (or cAMP). Within certain cells the enzyme adenylate cyclase makes cAMP from ATP, and typically this reaction is regulated by hormones such as adrenaline or glucagon. cAMP plays an important role in intracellular signaling. In skeletal muscle, cyclic AMP, triggered by adrenaline, starts a cascade (cAMP-dependent pathway) for the conversion of myophosphorylase-b into the phosphorylated form of myophoshorylase-a for glycogenolysis.

== See also ==
- DNA
- Oligonucleotide
- Phosphodiesterase
- Glutamate flavoring
- Kikunae Ikeda
- Umami
- Ajinomoto
- Tien Chu Ve-Tsin
- Glutamic acid
- Disodium glutamate
- Monopotassium glutamate
- Disodium inosinate
- Guanosine monophosphate
- Inosinic acid
