= Disodium glutamate =

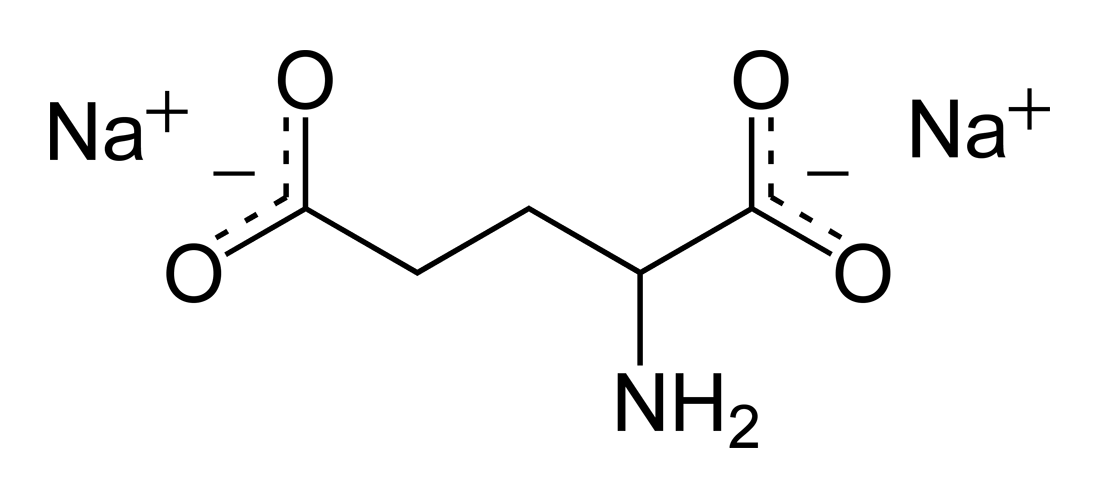

Names
- IUPAC name Disodium 2-aminopentanedioate
- Other names DSG

Identifiers
CAS Number	142-47-2
3D model (JSmol)	Interactive image; Interactive image
ChemSpider	7969883
PubChem CID	9794116
UNII	C3C196L9FG
- InChI: InChI=1S/C5H9NO4.2Na/c6-3(5(9)10)1-2-4(7)8;;/h3H,1-2,6H2,(H,7,8)(H,9,10);;/q;2*+1/p-2 Key: PXEDJBXQKAGXNJ-UHFFFAOYSA-L; InChI=1/C5H9NO4.2Na/c6-3(5(9)10)1-2-4(7)8;;/h3H,1-2,6H2,(H,7,8)(H,9,10);;/q;2*+1/p-2 Key: PXEDJBXQKAGXNJ-NUQVWONBAI
- SMILES: C(CC(=O)[O-])C(C(=O)[O-])N.[Na+].[Na+]; [Na+].[Na+].O=C([O-])CCC(N)C([O-])=O

Properties
Chemical formula	C_{5}H_{7}NNa_{2}O_{4}
Molar mass	191.09 g/mol
Appearance	white crystalline powder
Odor	practically odorless
Boiling point	225 °C (437 °F; 498 K) (decomposes)
Solubility in water	73.9 g/100 mL (25 °C)
Solubility	sparingly soluble in alcohol
Acidity (pK_{a})	6.8

Hazards
- Lethal dose or concentration (LD, LC)
LD_{50} (median dose)	16600 mg.mg (rat, oral)
- Except where otherwise noted, data are given for materials in their standard state (at 25 °C [77 °F], 100 kPa). verify (what is ?) Infobox references

Disodium glutamate, abbreviated DSG, (Na_{2}C_{5}H_{7}NO_{4}) is a sodium salt of glutamic acid. It is used as a flavoring agent to impart umami flavor.

== Formation ==
Disodium glutamate can be produced by neutralizing glutamic acid with two molar equivalents of sodium hydroxide (NaOH).

== See also ==
- Monosodium glutamate
