= Tien Chu =

Chinese food company

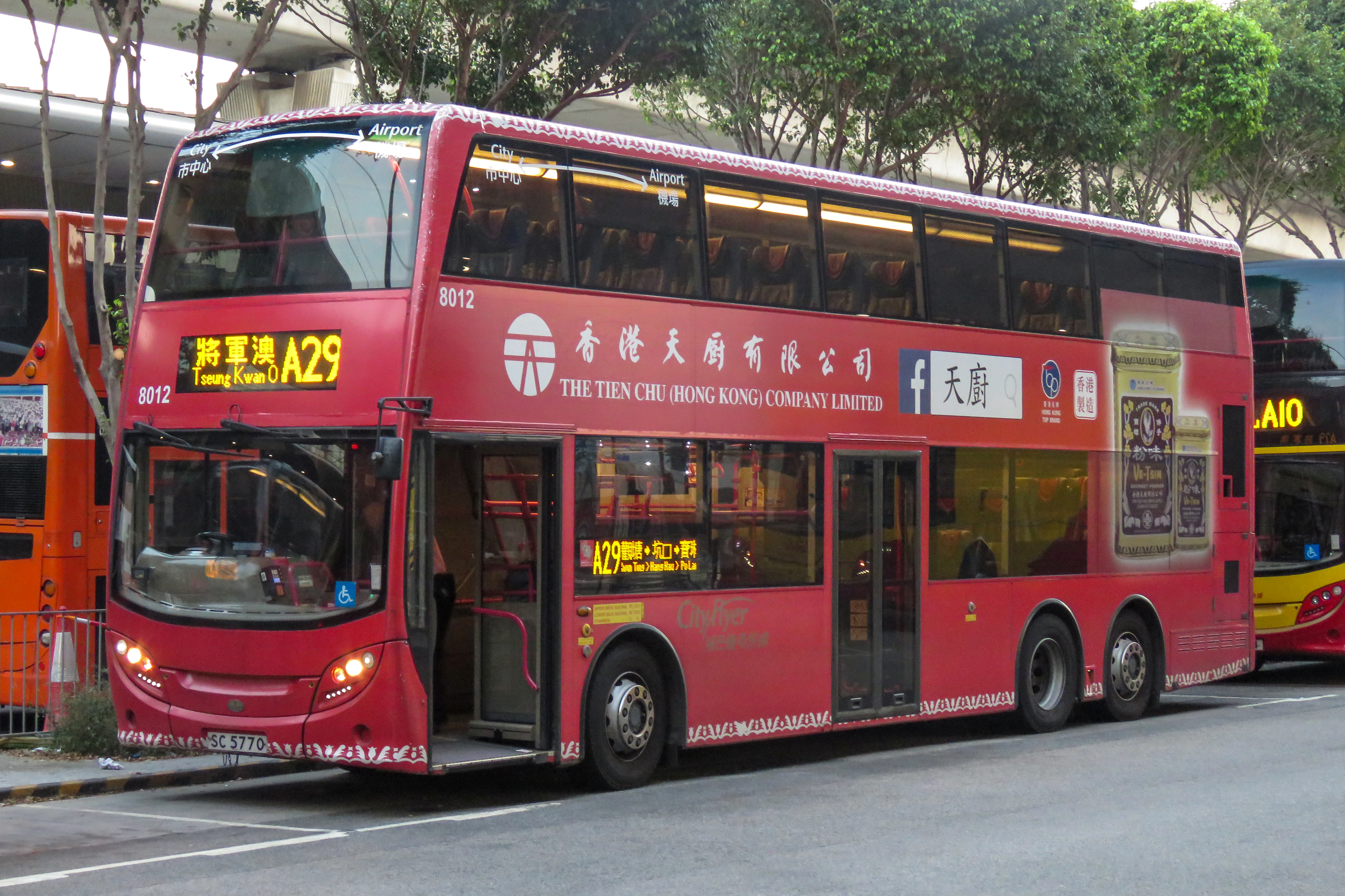
A Cityflyer bus with Tien Chu advertisement in Hong Kong

Tien Chu Ve-Tsin Chemical Limited (Chinese: 天厨味精; pinyin: Tiānchú Wèijīng), also transliterated as Tian Chu or Tianchu, is a Chinese manufacturer of honey by-products and food chemicals and additives including monosodium glutamate (MSG).

== History ==
The company was founded in Shanghai in 1921 by Chinese chemist and industrialist Wu Yunchu. By 1923, through Wu Yunchu's research and experimentation, the company became a primary manufacturer of monosodium glutamate (MSG).

In 1937, a factory was established in Hong Kong in To Kwa Wan, Kowloon, and was Hong Kong's sole MSG manufacturer.

In 1981, Shanghai Industrial Holdings was established in Hong Kong, and Tien Chu became a subsidiary of the group. Tien Chu was awarded a gold prize at the 1933 World's Fair in Chicago.

In 1999 the factory in To Kwa Wan was shut down and demolished, and was replaced by residential buildings.

The "Tianchu" brand, which originated from monosodium glutamate, eventually grew to be a comprehensive brand for five food categories: condiments, organic foods, health foods, ready-to-eat foods, and snack foods. Its products are sold in over 40 countries.

In the 21st century, the Hong Kong-based Tianchu company developed into a diversified conglomerate comprising real estate, investment, and food manufacturing. It also greatly expanded into the mainland China market. In 2003, it established Hangzhou Tianchu Miyuan Health Products in a joint venture with Hangzhou Miyuan Health Products.
