= Maggi (name) =

Maggi is both a surname and a given name. Notable people with the name include:

== Surname ==
- Aimo Maggi (1756–1793), Italian painter of the Neoclassic periods
- Amina Pirani Maggi (1892–1979), Italian stage and film actress
- Angelo Maggi (born 1955), Italian actor and voice actor
- Annibale Maggi, Venetian architect of the Renaissance period
- Antonio Maggi (born 1932), Italian former tennis player
- Aymo Maggi (1903–1961), Italian racing car driver
- Bartolomeo Maggi (1477–1552), Italian military surgeon
- Blairo Maggi (born 1956), Brazilian politician and businessman, owner of the André Maggi Group, former governor of Mato Grosso
- Carlo Maggi (Latinized Carolus Magius, d. c. 1587), Venetian citizen and traveller
- Carlo Maria Maggi (1630–1699), Italian scholar, writer and poet
- Carlos Maggi (1922–2015), Uruguayan lawyer, playwright, journalist and writer
- Cesare Maggi (1881–1961), Italian painter
- Diana Maggi (1925–2022), Italian-Argentine actress
- Drew Maggi (born 1989), American professional baseball infielder
- Émile Maggi (1908–1986), French racewalker
- Fabio Maggi (born 1978), former professional tennis player from Italy
- Giorgio Maggi (born 1997), Swiss professional racing driver
- Girolamo Maggi (c. 1520 – 1572), Italian scholar, jurist, poet, military engineer, urban planner, philologist, archaeologist, mathematician, and naturalist
- Giuseppe Maggi (1930–2025), Italian archaeologist
- Julius Maggi (1846–1912), founder of Nestlé's Maggi
- Leopoldo Maggi (1840–1905), Italian physician, craniologist, and naturalist
- Luigi Maggi (1867–1946), Italian actor and film director
- Marco Maggi (born 1957), New York and Uruguay-based artist
- Maurren Maggi (born 1976), Brazilian athlete
- Maria Maggi, a pseudonym used to conceal the identity of the corpse of Maria Eva Duarte de Peron while interred in Italy from 1955 to 1971
- Maria Maggi, a terrorist involved with the Piazza della Loggia bombing
- Ortensia Poncarale Maggi (1732–1811), Italian painter
- Pietro Maggi (1680–1738), Italian painter of the late-Baroque period
- Romina Maggi (born 1976), Argentine athlete
- Sebastian Maggi OP (1412–1496), Blessed, Italian Roman Catholic priest and confessor to both Savonarola and St. Catherine of Genoa
- Susan Maggi, Canadian film editor
- Xavier Vela Maggi (born 1989), Brazilian rower

== Given name ==
- Maggi Dawn, British musician, author and theologian
- Maggi Hambling (born 1945), British painter and sculptor
- Maggi Kvestad (1921–2004), Norwegian speed skater
- Maggi Lidchi-Grassi (born 1930), French writer and spiritual teacher
- Maggi McNellis (1917–1989), American radio personality
- Maggi Parker (born 1927), American actress
- Maggi Payne (born 1945), American composer, flautist, and video artist
- Maggi Rubenstein (1931-2024), American sexologist and activist for bisexual rights
- Margaret W. Weston, known as Maggi Weston, English-born photography collector and promoter
