= Maggi (disambiguation) =

Maggi is a Nestlé brand.

Maggi may also refer to:

- Maggi (name)
- Maggi & Me, Singaporean sitcom
- Agropecuaria Maggi and Maggi Energy, part of Amaggi Group

== See also ==
- Magi (disambiguation)
- Maggie (disambiguation)
