= Sanjay Jain (advocate) =

Indian lawyer and additional solicitor general

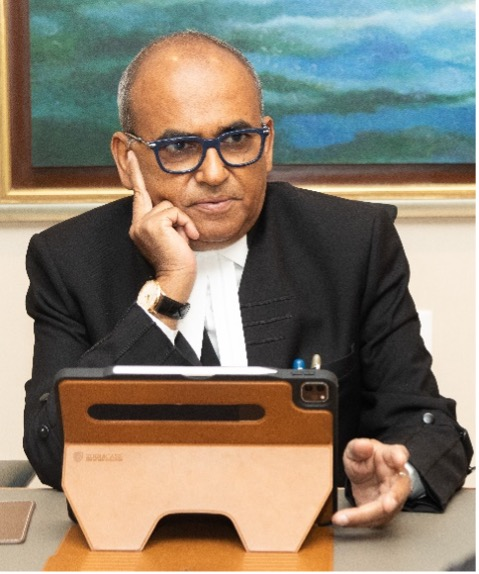
- Sanjay Jain (Senior Advocate)
- Born: May 17, 1962 (age 63); New Delhi, India
- Occupation: Senior Advocate at the Supreme Court of India
- Website: thesanjayjain.com

Sanjay Jain is a prominent Indian lawyer and former Additional Solicitor General of India. His legal career is marked by significant contributions to various fields of law, including constitutional issues, taxation, insolvency and public interest litigation.

== Early life and education ==
Sanjay Jain completed his schooling across various cities in India, finally joining the University of Delhi P.G.D.A.V. COLLEGE in 1979 to pursue a Bachelor of Commerce (Honours). He later shifted to legal studies, enrolling in Law Centre – I of the University of Delhi, where he was elected President of the Students' Union in 1984–85. He also has a Masters in Political Science from the University of Delhi.

== Early career ==
Jain began his legal career in 1985, initially focusing on civil litigation. The 1990s saw a diversification in his practice, with an expanding client base that included multinational corporations like American Express and GE Capital, amongst others.

Jain is a first-generation lawyer.

Bar Council of Delhi

In 1998 and 2003, Jain was elected as a member of the Bar Council of Delhi, where he served as Honorary Secretary and played a role in modernizing its functioning. He also chaired its Disciplinary Committee, as well as served as the Chairperson of the Advocate Welfare Trust Committee.

Senior Advocate

The Delhi High Court designated Jain as a Senior Advocate in December 2005, recognizing his legal expertise in various domains, including Intellectual Property Laws and Commercial Disputes.

== Tenure as Additional Solicitor General of India ==
ASG at the Delhi High Court (2014–2019)

In 2014, Sanjay Jain was appointed as the Additional Solicitor General of India at the Delhi High Court. During his tenure, he handled a wide array of cases, including high-profile scams, challenges under the Unlawful Activities (Prevention) Act (UAPA) Tribunals, and issues related to the Competition Act, 2002. Jain was involved in key cases concerning drug price control orders, the subsidy regime for urea and fertilizers, and coal mines allocation auctions. He also represented complex Income Tax matters across various high courts in India, contributing significantly to the legal discourse in these areas. In 2015, he was appointed to support the Rajya Sabha in a motion for impeachment of a High Court Judge before the Judges Inquiry Committee.

ASG at the Supreme Court of India (2019–2023)

In January 2019, Jain's role expanded as he was appointed the Additional Solicitor General for the Supreme Court of India. His portfolio included cases related to Direct and Indirect Taxes, Reservation Policy, Land Acquisition, and Arbitration. Post the COVID-19 pandemic, Jain's work encompassed an expanded range of legal issues, including service law, education law, constitutional matters, and cases involving the death penalty, narcotics, and money laundering. A notable achievement during this period was his involvement in the Lajpat Nagar Bomb Blast case, where his arguments contributed to the reversal of acquittal and reduction of punishment for the convicts.

== Notable legal cases ==
The 2G Spectrum Scam

The 2G spectrum scam, a major political and financial scandal in India, surfaced in 2010, highlighting issues of corruption, transparency, and accountability in governance. In 2017, a special CBI court acquitted all the accused, citing insufficient evidence. However, this decision was later appealed. Sanjay Jain represented the CBI in these appeal proceedings and was successful in persuading the Delhi High Court after an intensely contested long drawn legal battle spanning over 6 months and 53 hearings, to eventually grant leave to hear CBI's appeal against the acquittal judgment passed by the Spl Court, in a trial supervised by Supreme Court.

Anti-International Arbitration Injunction Suits

Jain played a key role in two significant anti-arbitration injunction suits filed on behalf of the Union of India against Khaitan Holdings (Mauritius) Ltd. and Vodafone Group. These suits aimed to restrain the companies from continuing arbitral proceedings under Bilateral Investment Treaties. In the Vodafone case, the Delhi High Court upheld the argument that Indian courts had jurisdiction over such matters.

Class Action Petition against Nestle

Sanjay Jain represented the Department of Consumer Affairs, in a class action suit against Nestle India. The lawsuit, amounting to Rs 640 crores, addressed allegations of unfair trade practices related to Maggi, a ready-to-cook instant noodles.

Short Service Commission for Women in the Army

In a landmark case related to gender equality in the Indian Armed Forces, Jain represented the Union Government. The Supreme Court directed the grant of permanent commission and consequential promotions to women Short Service Commission officers, acknowledging Jain's contributions to resolving complex issues in this case.

Tax Exemption on Incentives to Medical Professionals

Sanjay Jain represented the Income Tax Department in a notable case before the Supreme Court of India, arguing against tax exemptions on expenditures incurred by pharmaceutical companies for providing incentives to medical practitioners for product promotion. His successful representation led to a decision that these expenditures would not qualify for tax exemptions.

Advocacy in Surrogacy Rights

Jain played a significant role in a landmark case involving surrogacy rights. The case revolved around a woman with MRKH Syndrome, a condition affecting the ability to conceive. Jain's arguments before the Supreme Court contributed to a stay on an amendment that restricted donor gametes in gestational surrogacy, thereby enabling the woman to pursue surrogacy with donor oocytes. The Central government has updated the Surrogacy (Regulation) Rules, 2022, stating that if a married couple is medically certified as unable to conceive, they are not required to provide both gametes for surrogacy. However, they must contribute at least one gamete for the procedure.

The GNCTD vs Union of India (Article 239AA Dispute)

In the legal dispute concerning the interpretation of Article 239AA of the Constitution of India, Sanjay Jain was part of the legal team representing the Central Government and the Lieutenant Governor of Delhi. This case focused on the control of services under Entry 41 of the List II of the Seventh Schedule of the Constitution. Jain's role in this case included defending the Central Government's decision to extend the tenure of the Chief Secretary of Delhi, offering arguments about the comprehensive responsibilities of the Chief Secretary in both the legislative and executive domains of the elected Government of Delhi, as well as in roles reserved for the Central Government.

Farishtey Scheme Case

Jain represented the Hon’ble Lieutenant Governor of Delhi in a significant case concerning the Farishtey scheme. His arguments before the Supreme Court helped establish that the scheme is run by a society headed by the Delhi Health Minister, thereby clarifying any misconceptions regarding the Lieutenant Governor's involvement.
