= Imbibe =

Alcoholic beverage review magazine

- Frequency: six times a year
- Founder: Karen Foley
- Founded: 2005
- Company: Imbibe Media
- Country: United States
- Based in: Portland, Oregon
- Language: English
- Website: imbibemagazine.com
- ISSN: 1557-7082

Imbibe is a magazine published in Portland, Oregon, United States. It is published six times a year. The magazine covers beverages of all kinds, including spirits, wine, beer, coffee, and tea.

== History ==
The first issue of Imbibe was released in 2005.

== Awards and mentions ==
The Sacramento Bee has called Imbibe "a leading magazine of cocktail culture". The magazine also received a Tales of the Cocktail Spirited Award: Best Cocktail Writing in 2014, a James Beard Foundation Award in 2012, the Michael Jackson Beer Journalism Award in 2008, the Maggie Awards for Best Special Interest Magazine in 2007 and 2008, and the Eddie Award for Best Epicurean Magazine in 2007.
