= Maggie Weston =

Maggi or Margaret Weston may refer to:

- Lt MaggieWeston, a fictional character in Exofleet
- Maggie Weston (make-up artist), make-up artist, married to Terry Gilliam
- Maggi Weston, actress, seen in Regeneration (1915 film) and The Foundling (1915 film)
- Margaret Weston (1926–2021), Director of the Science Museum, London
- Margaret W. Weston, photography collection and gallery owner
