= Maggie (disambiguation) =

Maggie is a feminine given name or nickname.

Maggie may also refer to:

== Arts and entertainment ==
=== Film and television ===
- The Maggie, a 1954 British comedy film
- Maggie (film), a 2015 American drama/horror film
- Maggie (1981 American TV series), a 1981–1982 American sitcom based on the books of Erma Bombeck
- Maggie (British TV series), a 1981–1982 British television series based on the novels by Joan Lingard
- Maggie (1998 TV series), a 1998–1999 American TV series starring Ann Cusack
- Maggie (2022 TV series), an American sitcom on Hulu
- "Maggie" (The Afterparty episode), a 2022 episode of The Afterparty
- "Maggie", an unsold American television pilot aired as an episode of New Comedy Showcase in 1960

=== Musicals ===
- Maggie, 1919 stage musical by H. F. Maltby and Fred Thompson, adapted from the French
- Maggie (Wild musical), a 1977 stage musical by Michael Wild
- Maggie (Reid musical), a 2023 musical by Johnny Reid

=== Other arts and entertainment ===
- Maggie: A Girl of the Streets, a novel by Stephen Crane
- "Maggie", a 1983 Foster and Allen version of the song "When You and I Were Young, Maggie"

== Places in the United States ==
- Maggie, Virginia, an unincorporated community
- Maggie, West Virginia, an unincorporated community
- Maggie Creek (South Fork Flathead River tributary), Montana
- Maggie Creek (Humboldt River tributary), Nevada

== Science and technology ==
- Maggie (astronomy), a cloud of hydrogen gas located in the Milky Way galaxy
- Mars Aerial and Ground Global Intelligent Explorer (MAGGIE)
- MAGGIE ("Mars Automated Giant Gizmo for Integrated Engineering"), an engineering model of the 2020 Mars rover Curiosity

== Other uses ==
- Tropical Storm Maggie, various Pacific Ocean storms
- Maggie, nickname for the aircraft carrier HMCS Magnificent (CVL 21)
- Maggie, nickname for the Lady Margaret Boat Club, St. John's College, Cambridge, UK, rowing club
- Maggie, the Australian magpie in Australian English
- Maggie the Monkey (born 1991), a macaque at the Bowmanville Zoo

== See also ==
- Maggie's, a network of drop-in centres across the United Kingdom and abroad for those with cancer
- Maggie, Maggie, Maggie!, a British strike chant
- Maggi (disambiguation)
