= Maggie T =

Maggie T may refer to:

- Margaret Thatcher (1925–2013), British stateswoman and former Prime Minister, informally referred to as Maggie T
- Maggie Tabberer (born 1936), Australian television personality, launched a plus-size clothing label called Maggie T

== See also ==
- "I'm in Love with Margaret Thatcher", in which Thatcher is humorously referred to as Maggie T
- Maggie (disambiguation)
