= Typhoon Maggie =

Pacific typhoon in 1999

Typhoon Maggie (Etang)
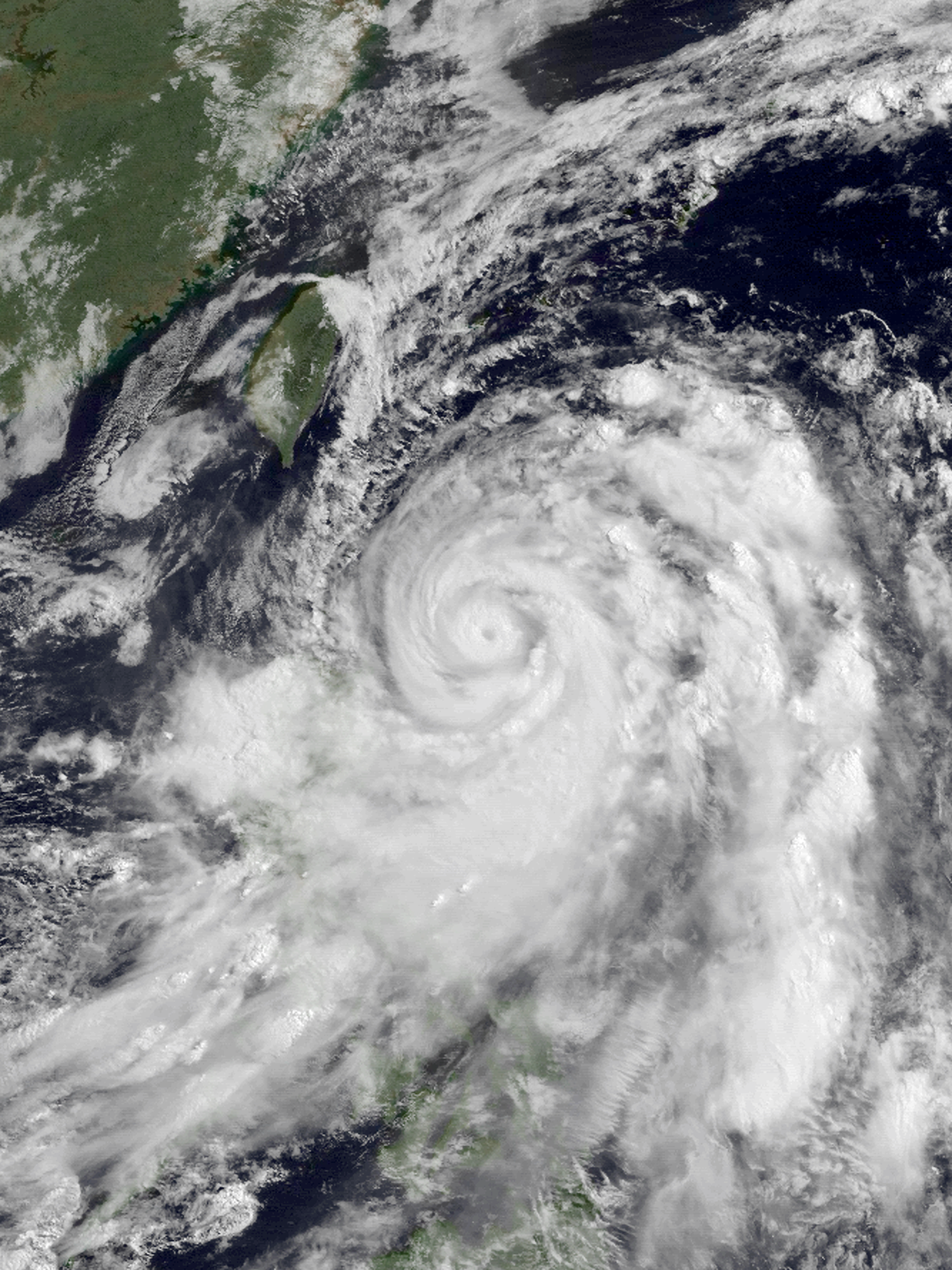
- Maggie at peak intensity north of Luzon on June 5

Meteorological history
- Formed: June 1, 1999
- Remnant low: June 8, 1999
- Dissipated: June 9, 1999

Typhoon
- 10-minute sustained (JMA)
- Highest winds: 140 km/h (85 mph)
- Lowest pressure: 955 hPa (mbar); 28.20 inHg

Category 3-equivalent typhoon
- 1-minute sustained (SSHWS/JTWC)
- Highest winds: 195 km/h (120 mph)
- Lowest pressure: 938 hPa (mbar); 27.70 inHg

Overall effects
- Fatalities: 9 total
- Damage: $168 million
- Areas affected: Philippines; Taiwan; Japan; South China; Vietnam
- IBTrACS
- Part of the 1999 Pacific typhoon season

Typhoon Maggie, known in the Philippines as Typhoon Etang, was a large and powerful typhoon that affected the Philippines and southeast Asia. The sixth tropical cyclone and second typhoon of the 1999 Pacific typhoon season, Maggie developed from a monsoon trough over the Philippine Sea on June 1. Quickly intensifying to tropical storm strength the following day, Maggie followed a northward course as it continued to intensify, reaching typhoon strength at 18:00 UTC as it turned northwestward. Maggie rapidly intensified to reach its peak intensity as a Category 3 equivalent typhoon on June 5 as it passed through the Luzon Strait. The typhoon brushed Taiwan on June 6 and began to weaken, making landfall near Hong Kong as a minimal typhoon on June 7. Afterward, Maggie weakened to a tropical storm as it briefly moved offshore. The storm moved back onshore the following day and quickly weakened, degenerating into a remnant area of low pressure on June 8.

Heavy rainfall from Maggie caused flooding and mudslides in the Philippines, which claimed the lives of three people. The typhoon caused an additional two fatalities in Taiwan, while five others were reported missing. In the Chinese province of Guangdong, the typhoon left four people dead and damaged thousands of homes. The outer bands of the system produced moderate rainfall in parts of Indochina, causing localized flooding. Total damages from Maggie were estimated to be US$168 million.

== Meteorological history ==
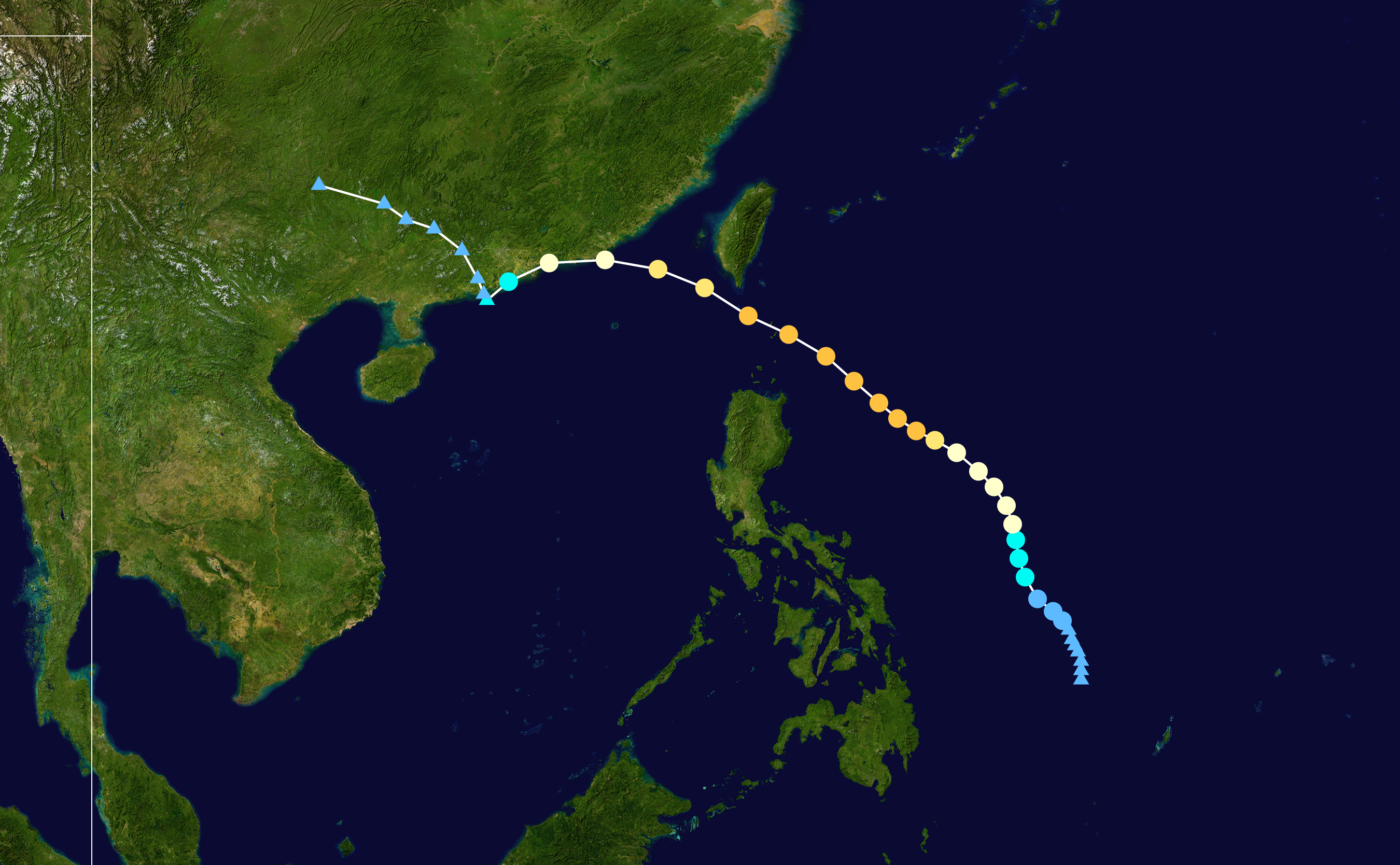
Map plotting the storm's track and intensity, according to the Saffir–Simpson scale Map key Saffir–Simpson scale Tropical depression (≤38 mph, ≤62 km/h) Tropical storm (39–73 mph, 63–118 km/h) Category 1 (74–95 mph, 119–153 km/h) Category 2 (96–110 mph, 154–177 km/h) Category 3 (111–129 mph, 178–208 km/h) Category 4 (130–156 mph, 209–251 km/h) Category 5 (≥157 mph, ≥252 km/h) Unknown Storm type Tropical cyclone Subtropical cyclone Extratropical cyclone, remnant low, tropical disturbance, or monsoon depression

The disturbance that was to become Typhoon Maggie, a monsoon trough, was first mentioned as a by the Joint Typhoon Warning Center (JTWC) at 06:00 UTC on May 27. Initially, the disturbance was disorganized, mostly consisting of scattered convection with no discernible rotation or center of circulation. However, the disturbance gradually organized over the next few days, presenting organized convection and good outflow within an environment with low wind shear. At 00:00 UTC on June 1, a tropical depression developed from the trough, aided by a strong and moist cross-equatorial flow. PAGASA and the Japan Meteorological Agency (JMA) began issuing advisories on the depression at that time, with the former assigning it the local name Etang. At the same time, the JTWC issued a Tropical Cyclone Formation Alert (TCFA). The JTWC issued their first advisory on the system eight hours later. The depression quickly strengthened into Tropical Storm Maggie at 00:00 UTC the following day, and at 18:00 UTC the JMA upgraded it to a typhoon, with PAGASA following suit a day later. Satellite imagery and intensity reports early on June 3 suggested the formation of a banding eye in the center of the system, leading to further organization and intensification as it continued on a northward course. A subtropical ridge to the north of the system became the dominant steering influence, causing Maggie to turn northwestward. Satellite imagery on June 4 revealed a well-developed eyewall and an anticyclone established directly over the center of the typhoon, signaling that rapid intensification could be occurring. Early on June 5, Maggie reached its peak intensity with maximum 1-minute sustained winds of 195 km/h (120 mph) while located over the Luzon Strait.

After reaching peak intensity, Maggie began to gradually weaken due to land interaction with the island of Taiwan. The subtropical ridge to the system's north strengthened, steering the cyclone further westward towards the southeast coast of China. On June 6, the weakening typhoon absorbed Tropical Depression Gening. At 12:00 UTC on June 6, Maggie made landfall approximately 55 nautical miles east-northeast of Hong Kong with 1-minute sustained winds of 150 km/h (93 mph). Weakening to a tropical storm overland, Maggie moved back offshore later that day as it paralleled the coast, passing just northwest of Hong Kong before becoming quasi-stationary off the Chinese coast, with the JTWC issuing the final warning on the system at 03:00 UTC. However, the JMA and the Hong Kong Observatory (HKO) still carried Maggie as a strong tropical storm. Although the JMA later dropped the system as a tropical cyclone, the HKO continued to observe Maggie as a weak tropical storm. Afterward, Maggie moved northwestward, making a second and final landfall near the mouth of the Pearl River late on June 7. The weakening storm moved inland and weakened to a tropical depression shortly after landfall, with the HKO issuing their final warning on the system at 06:00 UTC on June 8 while it was located north of Wuzhou. The weakening system subsequently degenerated into a remnant low pressure area and continued northwestward before dissipating on June 9.

== Preparations and impact ==
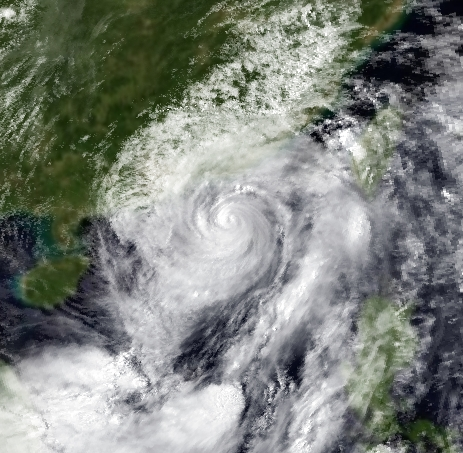
Typhoon Maggie after peak intensity south of China on June 6

Due to the broad nature of the system, heavy rain from Maggie caused flooding and mudslides in the Philippines, which left three people dead and two others with injuries. In northern Vietnam and parts of southeast Asia, the storm's remnants dropped heavy rainfall up to 100 mm (4 in), which caused localized flooding but were mostly beneficial to crops in the country.

Typhoon Maggie brought heavy rains and strong winds to Taiwan as the cyclone passed just south as a Category 3 equivalent typhoon. The winds and rain caused one fatality and cut off electricity to over 100,000 homes and caused US$18 million in agricultural damages as torrential rains flooded farmland and ruined crops. Offshore, five fishermen went missing after their vessels were damaged in the storm. In Hong Kong, several high wind signals were posted as the typhoon approached. Schools in Hong Kong were closed for the day while banks closed until 12:00 PM local time. Transportation was severely disrupted in the city as a number of ferry, bus, and taxi services were delayed and suspended and some roads were damaged. Four people were confirmed to have died as a result of the typhoon in Guandong Province, while 3,200 structures and 120 vessels were damaged or destroyed by high winds and heavy rain. An oil barge docked near Tsing Yi sank in high seas while another barge, carrying 50,000 liters of diesel fuel sank near Tuen Mun Ferry Pier, its cargo polluting the nearby Butterfly Beach, which was forced to close.

As Maggie passed south of Taiwan, a high potential vorticity (PV) zone developed to the north of the island, while a low PV zone developed to the east of the island. These dynamical atmospheric changes sent a plume of moisture northward into Japan, causing heavy rainfall on the southernmost island, Kyushu. This event, while uncommon, is not a unique event, and has been termed as a "moisture road".

== See also ==
- Other tropical cyclones named Maggie
- Typhoon Hal (1985) – Developed in the same manner and took a similar path.
- Typhoon Imbudo (2003) – Affected similar areas in July 2003.
- Typhoon Vicente (2012) – Powerful tropical cyclone that affected similar areas.
