= Hydrolyzed vegetable protein =

Foodstuffs obtained by protein hydrolysis

Hydrolyzed vegetable protein (HVP) products are vegetable-origin food products created with and made palatable by the hydrolysis of protein. They are solid foods, generally available to the consumer in the form of a powder, with a savory taste (known as umami) somewhat like broth or bouillon, often used as an additive for flavour.

Regarding the production process, a distinction can be made between acid-hydrolyzed vegetable protein (aHVP), enzymatically produced HVP, and HVP created with other seasonings (for example, fermented soy sauce). Hydrolyzed vegetable protein products are particularly used to round off the taste of soups, sauces, meat products, snacks, and other dishes, as well as for the production of ready-to-cook soups and bouillons.

== History ==
Food technologists have long known that protein hydrolysis produces a meat bouillon-like odor and taste. Hydrolysates have been a part of the human diet for centuries, notably in the form of fermented soy sauce, or Shoyu. Shoyu, traditionally made from wheat and soy protein, has been produced in Japan for over 1,500 years, following its introduction from mainland China. The origins of producing these materials through the acid hydrolysis of protein (aHVP) can be traced back to the scarcity and economic challenges of obtaining meat extracts during the Napoleonic wars.

In 1831, Berzelius obtained products having a meat bouillon taste when hydrolysing proteins with hydrochloric acid.

The first industrial production of acid-catalyzed hydrolyzed vegetable protein (HVP) was accomplished by Julius Maggi in 1886.

In 1906, Fischer found that amino acids contributed to the specific taste. In 1954, D. Phillips found that the bouillon odor required the presence of proteins containing threonine.

Another important substance that gives hydrolyzed vegetable protein a characteristic taste is glutamic acid.

== Manufacture ==
Almost all products rich in protein are suitable for the production of HVP. Today, it is made mainly from protein resources of vegetable origin, such as defatted oil seeds (soybean meal, grapeseed meal), and protein from grains (such as maize (Corn gluten meal), wheat (gluten), and rice), and pulses (such as dried peas). The process and the feedstock determines the organoleptic properties of the end product. Proteins consist of chains of amino acids joined through amide bonds. When subjected to hydrolysis (hydrolyzed), the protein is broken down into its component amino acids.

In aHVP, hydrochloric acid is used for hydrolysis. The remaining acid is then neutralized by mixing with an alkali, such as sodium hydroxide, which leaves behind table salt; this comprises up to 20% of the final product (acid-hydrolyzed vegetable protein, aHVP).

In enzymatic HVP (eHVP), proteases are used to break down the proteins under a more neutral pH and lower temperatures. The amount of salt is greatly reduced.

Because of the different processing conditions, the two types of HVP have different sensory profiles. aHVP is usually dark-brown in color and has a strong savory flavor, whereas eHVP usually is lighter in color and has a mild savory flavor.

=== Acid hydrolysis ===
Acid hydrolysates are produced from various edible protein sources, with soy, corn, wheat, and casein being the most common. For the production of aHVP, the proteins are hydrolyzed by cooking with a diluted (15–20%) hydrochloric acid, at a temperature between 90 and 120 °C for up to 8 hours. After cooling, the hydrolysate is neutralized with either sodium carbonate or sodium hydroxide to a pH of 5 to 6. During hydrolysis, extraneous polymeric material known as humin, which forms from the interaction of carbohydrate and protein fragments, is generated and subsequently removed by filtration and then further refined.

The source of the raw material, concentration of the acid, the temperature of the reaction, the time of the reaction, and other factors can all affect the organoleptic properties of the final product. Activated carbon treatment can be employed to remove both flavor and color components, to the required specification. Following a final filtration, the aHVP may, depending upon the application, be fortified with additional flavoring components. Thereafter, the product can be stored as a liquid at 30–40% dry matter, or alternatively it may be spray dried or vacuum dried and further used as a food ingredient.

One hundred pounds (45 kg) of material containing 60% protein will yield 100 pounds of aHVP, which contains approximately 40 pounds (18 kg) of salt. This salt gain occurs during the neutralization step.

=== Enzymatic hydrolysis ===
For the production process of enzymatic HVP, enzymes are used to break down the proteins. To break down the protein to amino acids, proteases are added to the mixture of defatted protein and water. Due to the sensitivity of enzymes to a specific pH, either an acid or a base is added to match the optimum pH. Depending on the activity of the enzymes, up to 24 hours are needed to break down the proteins. The mixture is heated to inactivate the enzymes and then filtered to remove the insoluble carbohydrates (humin).

Since no salt is formed during the production process, manufacturers may add salt to eHVP preparations to extend shelf life or to provide a product similar to conventional aHVP. A vendor source states that salt is conventionally added before eHVP production to control microbial growth. With acid-tolerant enzymes, some of the salt can be replaced with a small amount of an acid (patent literature mentioning the acid-tolerant enzyme suggests a reaction pH of 4) to reduce sodium content.

==== Enzymes used ====
A commonly used protease mixture is "Flavourzyme", extracted from Aspergillus oryzae, the mold used for soy sauce production. This mixture contains both endo- and exo-peptidases.

The endopeptidase Alcalase may also be used, but without an exopeptidase it tends to generate a bitter flavor. As a result, it should be used with a companion exopeptidase. A commercial exopeptidase produced for this purpose is "Protana Prime", a mixture with both leucine aminopeptidase and carboxypeptidase D activity.

Beyond proteolysis, the amount of umami taste can also be increased by adding a glutaminase, which converts glutamine to glutamate. Commercial options include "Protana Boost" and others.

== Composition ==
Liquid aHVP typically contains 55% water, 16% salt, 25% organic substances (thereof 20% protein (amino acids) analyzed as about 3% total nitrogen and 2% amino nitrogen).

Many amino acids have either a bitter or sweet taste. In many commercial processes, nonpolar amino acids such as L-leucine and L-isoleucine are often removed to create hydrolysates with a more mellow and less bitter character. D-tryptophan, D-histidine, D-phenylalanine, D-tyrosine, D-leucine, L-alanine, and glycine are known to be sweet, while bitterness is associated with L-tryptophan, L-phenylalanine, L-tyrosine, and L-leucine. When not specified explicitly, the chirality of an amino acid is assumed to be L-, the form found in natural proteins. However, the D-forms do occur in natural food materials in smaller amounts, and the harsh chemical condition of aHVP production is known to flip a small amount of molecules to the D-form. Modern aHVP production has a step for removing tyrosine and leucine from the hydrolysate.

Tyrosine is an amino acid susceptible to halogenation during hydrolysis with HCl. Lysine is stable under standard acid hydrolysis, but during heat treatment, the side-chain amino group can react with other compounds, such as reducing sugars, producing Maillard products.

The organoleptic properties of HVP is determined not only by amino acid composition, but also by the various aroma-bearing substances other than the amino acids created during the production of both aHVP and eHVP. Aromas can be formed via amino acid decomposition, Maillard reaction, sugar cyclization, and lipid oxidation. A complex mix of aromas similar to butter, meat, bone stock, wood smoke, lovage and many other substances can be produced, depending on reaction conditions (time, temperature, hydrolysis method, additional feedstock such as xylose and spices).

According to the European Code of Practice for Bouillons and Consommés, hydrolyzed protein products intended for retail sale correspond to these characteristics:

- Specific gravity at 20 °C min.: 1.22
- Total nitrogen min.: 4% (on dry matter)
- Amino nitrogen min.: 1.3% (on dry matter)
- Sodium chloride max.: 50% (on dry matter)

== Use ==
When foods are produced by canning, freezing, or drying, some flavor loss is almost inevitable. Manufacturers can use HVP to make up for it. Therefore, HVP is used in a wide variety of products, such as in the spice, meat, fish, fine-food, snack, flavor, and soup industries.

== Safety ==
=== 3-MCPD ===
3-MCPD, a carcinogen in rodents and a suspected human carcinogen, is created during acid-hydrolysis as glycerol released from lipid (e.g. triglycerides) reacts with hydrochloric acid. Legal limits have been set to keep aHVP products safe for human consumption. aHVP manufacturers can reduce the amount of 3-MCPD to acceptable limits by (1) careful control of reaction time and temperature (2) timely neutralization of hydrochloric acid, optionally extending to an alkaline hydrolysis step to destroy any 3-MCPD already formed (3) replacement of hydrochloric acid with other acids such as sulfuric acid.

=== As an allergen ===
Whether hydrolyzed vegetable protein is an allergen or not is contentious.

According to European law, wheat and soy are subject to allergen labelling in terms of Regulation (EU) 1169/2011 on food information to consumers. Since wheat and soy used for the production of HVP are not exempted from allergen labelling for formal reasons, HVP produced by using those raw materials has to be labelled with a reference to wheat or soy in the list of ingredients.

Nevertheless, strong evidence indicates at least aHVP is not allergenic, since proteins are degraded to single amino acids which are not likely to trigger an allergic reaction. A 2010 study has shown that aHVP does not contain detectable traces of proteins or IgE-reactive peptides. This provides strong evidence that aHVP is very unlikely to trigger an allergic reaction to people who are intolerant or allergic to soy or wheat. Earlier peer-reviewed animal studies done in 2006 also indicate that soy-hypersensitive dogs do not react to soy hydrolysate, a proposed protein source for soy-sensitive dogs.

There are reports of a cosmetic-grade aHVP, Glupearl 19S (GP19S), inducing anaphylaxis when present in soap. Unlike food aHVP, this Japanese wheat aHVP is only very mildly hydrolyzed. The unusual chemical condition makes GP19S more allergenic than pure gluten. Newer regulations for cosmetic hydrolyzed wheat protein have been developed in response, requiring an average molecular mass of less than 3500 Da – about 35 residues long. In theory, "an allergen must have at least 2 IgE-binding epitopes, and each epitope must be at least 15 amino acid residues long, to trigger a type 1 hypersensitivity reaction." Experiments also show that this degree of hydrolysis is sufficient to not trigger IgE binding from GP19S-allergic patients.

Allergenicity of eHVP depends on the specific food source and the enzyme used. Alcalase is able to render chickpea and green pea completely non-immunoreactive but papain only achieves partial reduction. Alcalase is also unable to make white beans non-reactive due to the antinutritional factors preventing complete digestion. Alcalase, but not "Flavourzyme" (a commercial Aspergillus oryzae protease blend for eHVP production), is able to make roasted peanut non-reactive.

== Regulation ==
aHVP is not acceptable in the production of natural flavors in the EU, but eHVP is.

== See also ==
- Hydrolyzed protein
- MSG
