= Julius Caesar Aranzi =

Italian physician and anatomist (c. 1529–1589)

- Born: c. 1529; Bologna
- Died: April 7, 1589
- Other name: Arantius
- Known for: human anatomy

Julius Caesar Aranzi (Giulio Cesare Aranzio, Arantius) (1529/1530 – April 7, 1589) was a leading figure in the history of the science of human anatomy.

== Biography ==
He was born in Bologna, the son of Ottaviano di Jacopo and Maria Maggi. Owing to the poverty of the family, he studied with his uncle Bartolomeo Maggi (1477–1552), a famous surgeon who was a lecturer at the University of Bologna as well as court physician to Julius III. He held this uncle in such high esteem that he assumed his surname, calling himself Giulio Cesare Aranzio Maggio.

He was admitted to the University of Padua, where he made his first discovery in 1548, at the age of nineteen, when he described the elevator muscle of the upper eyelid. Later, at the University of Bologna, he received a doctorate in medicine in 1556 and was appointed a lecturer in medicine and surgery shortly thereafter at the age of twenty-seven. In 1570, surgery and anatomy were separated into separate professorships at his instigation and he held the newly created chair in anatomy for thirty-three years until his death at Bologna in 1589.

From Aranzio came the first correct account of the anatomical peculiarities of the fetus, and he was the first to show that the muscles of the eye do not, as was previously imagined, arise from the dura mater but from the margin of the optic hole. He also, after considering the anatomical relations of the cavities of the heart, the valves and the great vessels, corroborated the views of Realdo Colombo regarding the course which the blood follows in passing from the right to the left side of the heart.

Aranzio was the first anatomist to describe distinctly the inferior cornua of the ventricles of the cerebrum, who recognizes the objects by which they are distinguished, and who gives them the name by which they are still known (hippocampus) in 1564; and his account is more minute and perspicuous than that of the authors of the subsequent century. He speaks at length of the choroid plexus, and gives a detailed description of the fourth ventricle, under the name of cistern of the cerebellum, as a discovery of his own. He also was the first to discover that the blood of mother and fetus remain separate during pregnancy.

As a professor of anatomy and surgery at the University of Bologna from 1556, he established anatomy as a major branch of medicine for the first time. Aranzi combined anatomy with a description of pathological processes, based largely on his own research, Galen, and the work of his contemporary Italians. Aranzi discovered the 'Nodules of Aranzio' in the semilunar valves of the heart and wrote the first description of the superior levator palpebral and the coracobrachialis muscles. His books (in Latin) covered surgical techniques for many conditions, including hydrocephalus, nasal polyp, goitre and tumours to phimosis, ascites, haemorrhoids, anal abscess and fistulae.

== Bibliography ==
- De humano foetu opusculum, Rome, 1564; Venice, 1571; Basel, 1579. 32: De formato foetu. Bononiae, J. Rubrius, 1564.
- De tumoribus secundum locus affectum. Bologna, 1571.
- In Hippocrates librum de vulneribus capitis. Leiden, 1580.
- Observationes anatomicae. Basel, 1579; Venice 1587.

These works were published together in Venice in 1587:

- De tumoribus prater naturam secundum locos affectus liber.
- De humano foetu liber.
- Anatomicarum observationum liber.
