= List of storms named Maggie =

The name Maggie has been used for three tropical cyclones in the Eastern Pacific Ocean, two in the northwest Pacific Ocean and one in the southwest Pacific Ocean.

Maggie has been used for three tropical cyclones in the Eastern Pacific Ocean.

- Tropical Storm Maggie (1966)
- Tropical Storm Maggie (1970)
- Hurricane Maggie (1974)

Maggie has been used for two tropical cyclones in the northwest Pacific Ocean.

- Tropical Storm Maggie (1946)
- Typhoon Maggie (1999) (T9903, 06W, Etang) – approached Taiwan and Hong Kong.

Maggie has been used for one tropical cyclone in the southwest Pacific Ocean.

- Cyclone Maggie-Muriel (1971)
