= Cesare Maggi =

Italian painter (1881–1961)

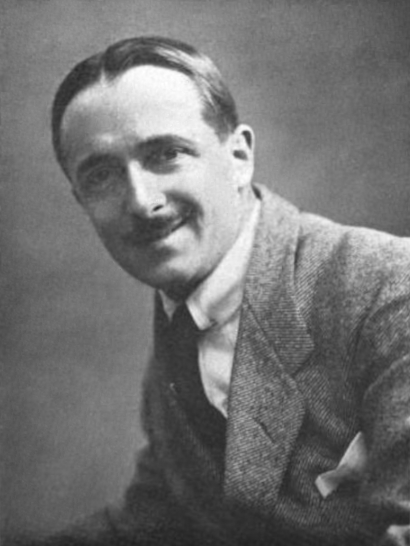
- Born: 13 January 1881; Rome, Italy
- Died: 13 May 1961 (aged 80); Turin, Italy
- Occupation: Painter

Cesare Maggi (1881–1961) was an Italian painter.

== Biography ==
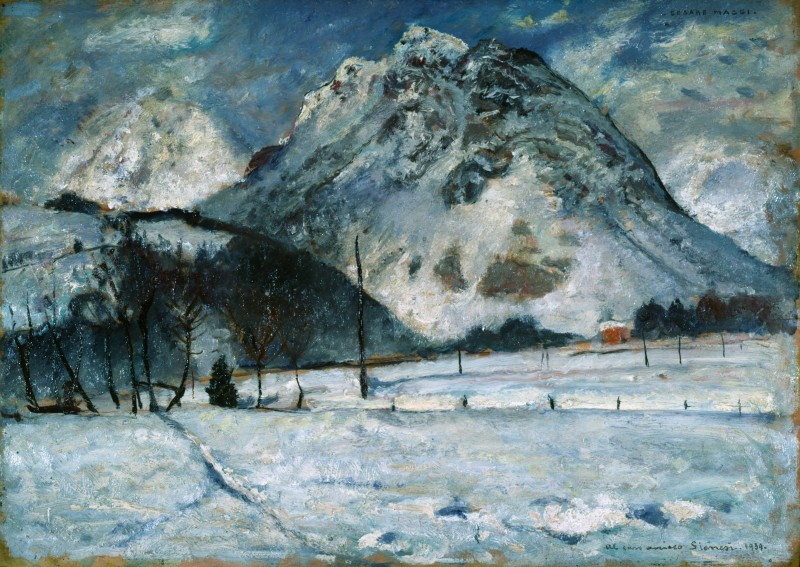
Paesaggio di montagna, c. 1939 (Fondazione Cariplo)

Cesare Maggi was born into a family of actors in Rome on 13 January 1881. He embarked on classical studies at his father's wish but also took up painting at a very early age, first with the Livornese artist Vittorio Matteo Corcos in 1897 and then with Gaetano Esposito in Naples. His debut in Florence at the Esposizione Annuale della Società di Belle Arti di Firenze in 1898 was followed by a short trip to Paris to catch up with the latest developments.

The crucial turning point in Maggi's art came in 1889 with the posthumous show of work by Giovanni Segantini held by the Milanese Society of Fine Arts, which prompted a definitive shift to landscape painting of a Divisionist character. After a short stay in the Engadin, he returned to Milan before finally settling in Turin. Commercial collaboration with Alberto Grubicy until 1913 enabled Maggi to establish himself quickly as one of the leading representatives of the second generation of Divisionist painters in Italy. He painted a repertoire of readily comprehensible mountain landscapes focusing primarily on aspects of the visual perception of the reflection of light and colour, but lacking the deep spirituality of Segantini's work. He took part in the major Italian and European exhibitions, and the Venice Biennale devoted an entire room to his work at the Esposizione Internazionale d'Arte of Venice in 1912. After an interlude devoted to portrait painting in the same decade, the artist's mature work focused on greater simplification of subject matter, mostly in landscapes. Maggi obtained the chair in painting at the Albertina Academy, Turin, in 1936.

He died at his home in Turin on 13 May 1961.
