= Maggi noodles safety concerns in India =

2015 food safety controversy

In May 2015, the Food and Drug Administration representatives from Barabanki, a district of Uttar Pradesh, India stated that samples of the product Maggi 2-Minute Noodles had unusually excessive levels of lead. This finding led to multiple market withdrawals and investigations in India and beyond.

== Timeline ==
- 3 June 2015 – The New Delhi Government banned the sale of Maggi in New Delhi stores for 15 days due to these findings. First Information Reports (FIRs) against Bollywood Maggi Brand Ambassadors Amitabh Bachchan, Madhuri Dixit, and Preity Zinta were lodged by Sudhir Kumar Ojha, a lawyer, at Muzaffarpur district court, asking the authorities to arrest them if required. He complained that he fell sick after eating Maggi, which he had purchased from a shop at Lenin Chowk on 30 May.
- 4 June 2015 – The Gujarat FDA banned the noodles for 30 days after 27 out of 39 samples were detected with objectionable levels of lead, among other things, and Assam banned sale, distribution, and storage of Maggi's "extra delicious chicken noodles" variety for 30 days after tests carried out at the state public health laboratory concluded that the particular variety contained added an excessively high amount of lead. On 4 June 2015 the government of Tamil Nadu banned Maggi foods due to an unacceptable amount of lead and other components.
- 5 June 2015 – The Andhra Pradesh Government also banned Maggi foods.
- Also on 5 June 2015, the Food Safety and Standards Authority of India (FSSAI) ordered a recall of all nine approved variants of Maggi instant noodles and oats masala noodles, suggesting that they were unsafe and hazardous for human consumption. On the same day, the Food Standards Agency of the United Kingdom launched an investigation into the level of lead in Maggi noodles.
- 6 June 2015 – The Central Government of India banned nationwide sales of Maggi noodles for an indefinite period.
- 26 June 2015 – During a press meeting, the Minister for Health and Family Welfare of Karnataka, U. T. Khader, stated that Maggi foods would not be banned.
- July 2015 – The Bombay High Court allowed the export of Maggi while the ban in India remained.
- August 2015 – Tests performed by the US health regulator FDA showed no dangerous lead levels in the products. On 13 August 2015, the nationwide ban was struck down by the Bombay high court. The court stated that proper procedure was not followed in issuing the ban and called into question the test results, as the samples were not tested at authorized laboratories accredited to the National Accreditation Board for Testing and Calibration Laboratories (NABL).

== Additional market bans ==
Some of India's biggest retailers (including Future Group's Big Bazaar, Easyday, and Nilgiris) imposed a nationwide ban on Maggi. In addition, multiple state authorities in India found an unacceptable amount of lead, leading to bans in more than five other states.

Nepal indefinitely banned Maggi over concerns about the lead levels in the product. Maggi noodles were subsequently withdrawn from the market of five African nations: Kenya, Uganda, Tanzania, Zimbabwe and South Sudan.

== Testing controversies ==
- Monosodium glutamate (MSG): Testing found some MSG in Maggi noodles. The packet stated "No added MSG"; however, MSG naturally occurs in hydrolyzed peanut protein, onion powder, and wheat flour (see: Glutamate flavoring § Natural occurrence). Maggi offered to remove the words "No added MSG" from the package to overcome the objection.
- Lead: Maggi noodles include flavouring packets named Tastemaker, which are intended to dissolve in water during cooking. Maggi insisted that testing should be done on the product as it is eaten; however, the FSSAI insisted that the powder itself should be tested. On 5 June 2015, the FSSAI said that the prescribed standards of 2.5 parts per million would have to apply to all components of the product. Out of the 13 samples tested by Delhi authorities, 10 of them had lead content exceeding this limit. The packets that initiated the investigation from Uttar Pradesh had 17.2 ppm of lead. Nestlé also questioned the reliability of the labs used. Results from testing outside of India (Singapore, US) reported that Maggi noodles were safe. In the later Bombay High Court judgment, the court agreed that the test results by earlier labs were unreliable. The court mandated testing to be done at three specific laboratories (Punjab, Hyderabad, and Jaipur) where Maggi was found safe. The lead may have been naturally occurring in plants and soil or from Indian spices, although within acceptable limits.

== Company response ==
Maggi always insisted that its noodle product is safe. Maggi recalled stock worth nearly ₹320 crore (₹3.2 Billion) from the shelves and paid ₹20 crores (₹200 million) to a cement factory to burn the product. In addition, the Corporate Affairs Ministry of India imposed a ₹640 crore (₹6.4 Billion) fine on Nestle India for the presence of MSG and lead beyond the permissible limit.

Following a consumer complaint in Kalyan in September 2026 alleging insects and worms in a packet of Maggi noodles, Nestle India said its Maggi products undergo multiple quality and food safety checks throughout production.

== Return to market ==
In India, Maggi products were returned to the shelves in November 2015, accompanied by a Nestlé advertising campaign to win back the trust of members of the Indian community. At this time, a satirical song on the incident "Maggi anthem" by Vir Das and Alien Chutney was released. Nestlé resumed production of Maggi at all five plants in India on 30 November 2015.
