= Maggie, Virginia =

Unincorporated community in Virginia, United States

- Unincorporated community
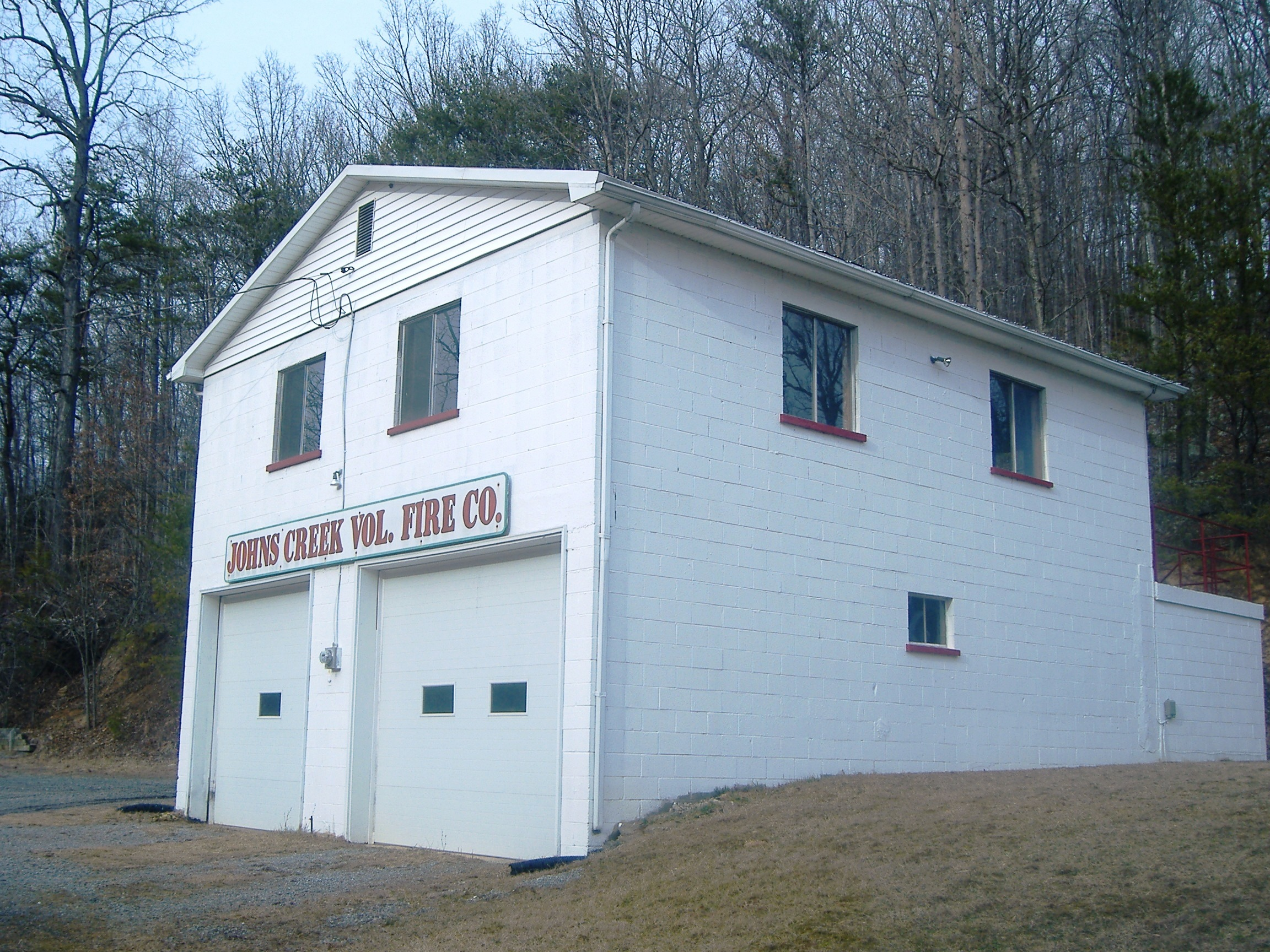
- Johns Creek Volunteer Fire Company in Maggie

- Location in Virginia Maggie (the United States)
- Coordinates: 37°25′24″N 080°22′55″W
- Country: United States
- State: Virginia
- County: Craig
- Elevation: 1,801 ft (549 m)
- Time zone: UTC-5 (Eastern (EST))
  - Summer (DST): UTC-4 (EDT)
- Area code: 540
- GNIS ID: 1485155
- FIPS code: 51-48648

Maggie is an unincorporated community in west-central Craig County, Virginia, United States. It lies along Dicks Creek Road.
