= Maggi =

International food brand

- Product type: Food
- Current owner: Nestlé
- Country: Switzerland
- Introduced: 1886; 140 years ago
- Ambassadors: Sharon Cuneta; Ernie Baron; Ai-Ai delas Alas; Kris Aquino; Kim Chiu; Judy Ann Santos; Ian Veneracion; Melai Cantiveros; Barbie Forteza; David Licauco; Kathryn Bernardo
- Website: Official website

Maggi (German: [ˈmaɡi], Swiss Standard German: ['maddʒi], Italian: [ˈmaddʒi]) is a Swiss brand of seasonings, instant soups, and noodles that originated in Switzerland in the late 19th century. In 1947, the Maggi brand was acquired by the Swiss giant Nestlé.

== History ==
=== Early history ===
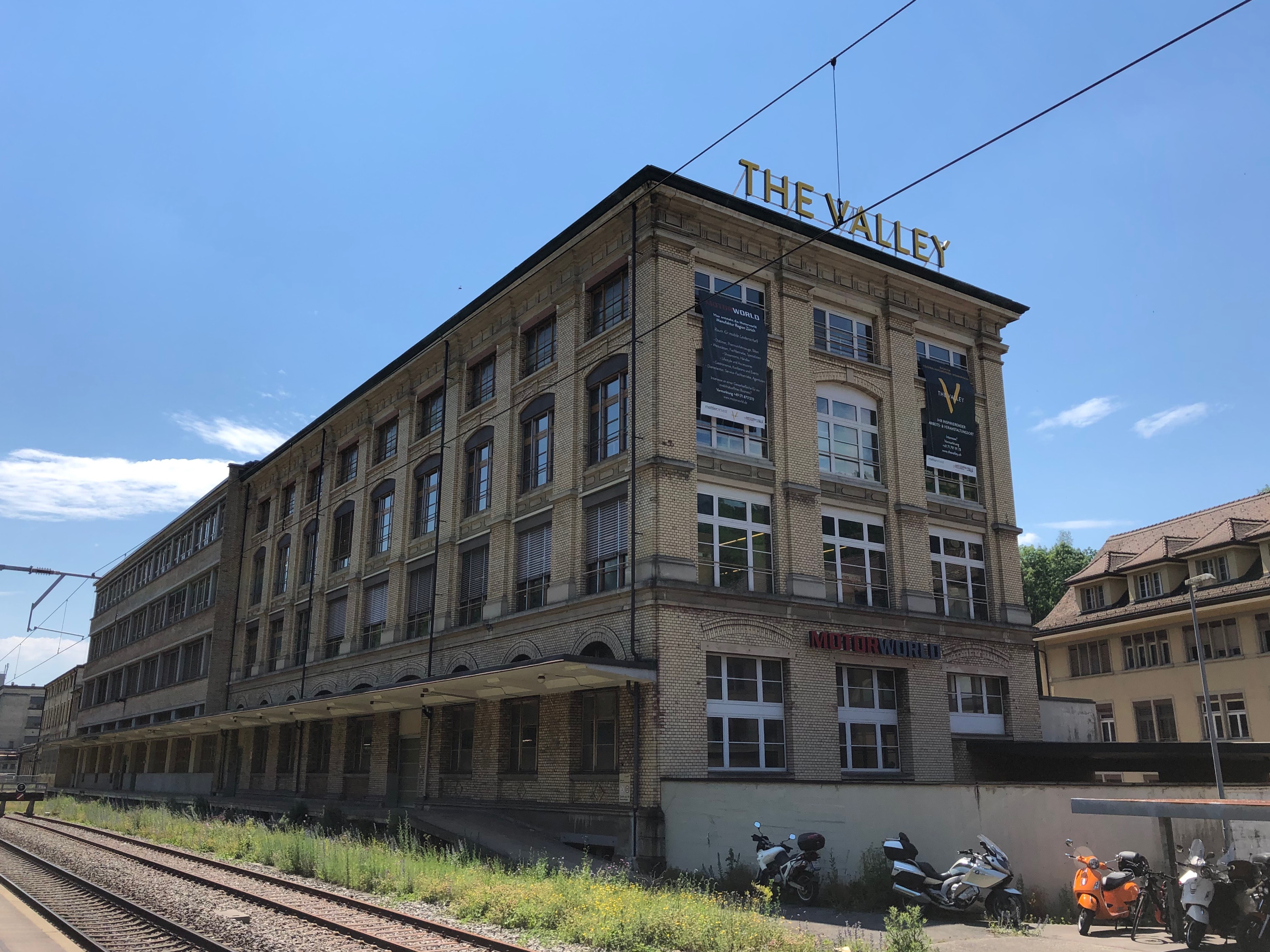
Former production building in Kemptthal (Zürich)

In 1869, Julius Maggi (1846–1912) took over his father's mill business in Kemptthal, Switzerland. Under his leadership, the business developed into one of the pioneers of industrial food production, with the aim of improving the diet of working-class families through better nutrient supply and faster preparation.

In 1882, at a meeting of the Swiss "Common Good Society" (Gemeinnützige Gesellschaft), the doctor and factory inspector Fridolin Schuler spoke about the miserable nutritional situation of the factory workers: women workers no longer had enough time to cook for their families; cold meals or alcohol often replaced warm meals; meals were served in factory canteens and were cheap but not sufficiently nutritious. The consequences were malnutrition, stomach diseases, and high infant mortality. Schuler advocated for diets based on high-protein, easily digestible pulses/legumes. He demanded that such meals should be offered to factory workers in a convenient form for quick preparation and at a low price. The society turned to the Maggi company, among others.

Julius Maggi experimented for two years with different methods of mechanical and chemical processing of legumes and different mixtures. The results were presented to the representatives of the Society on 19 November 1884. They approved the results and signed a contract to exclusively recommend Maggi's legumes for a period of three years. Maggi, in turn, guaranteed a fixed price and regular product controls for sales in Switzerland. However, the Society was accused of representing the interests of a private company. The Maggi company, on the other hand, had difficulties challenging other suppliers of soup powder on the market, despite support from the Society.

Since 1884, Maggi has been offering flour made from protein-rich legumes, which can be cooked quickly by being roasted beforehand. Maggi was the first to bring such legume meals to the market.

=== Expansion ===
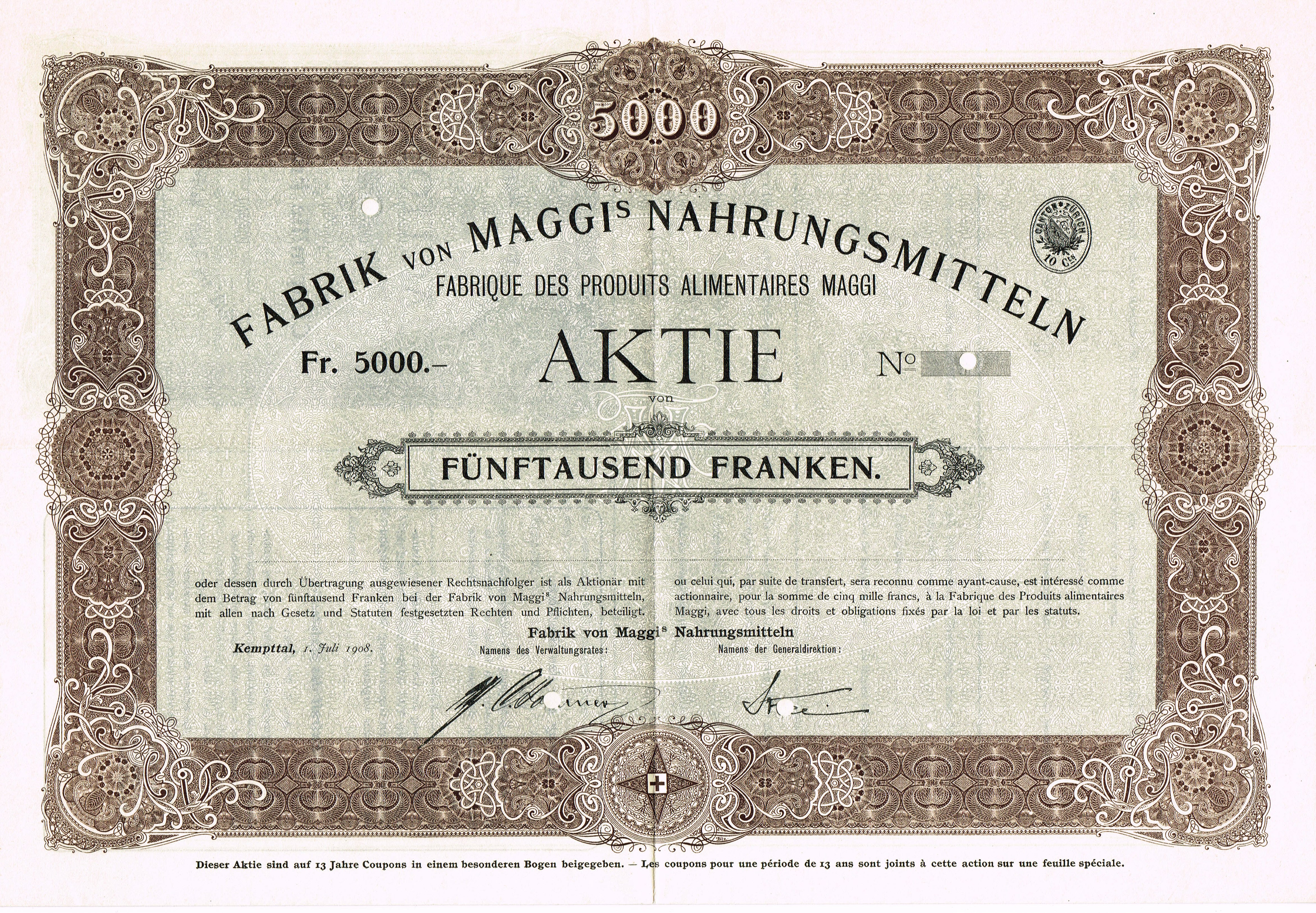
5,000-franc share of the Fabrik von Maggis Nahrungsmitteln, issued 1 July 1908

In 1885, Maggi brought nine industrially produced types of legume flour onto the market. In 1885, he received the "First Class Diploma" at the Swiss Culinary Art Exhibition in Zurich. In 1886, Maggi produced acid-hydrolyzed vegetable protein product industrially for the first time, producing the new "Maggi seasoning". The product combined with legume meals to make a ready-made soup as competition for the meat extract invented by Justus von Liebig. The first warehouses and branches abroad were founded, including Maggi GmbH in Singen, Germany in 1887. In order to obtain additional capital for the planned further expansion, the company was converted into a public limited company in 1889 with Julius Maggi as general director. In 1908, Maggi brought the bouillon cube onto the market, replacing the bouillon concentrate capsules.

Maggi introduced extensive social benefits that were unusual for the time, such as a canteen, workers' housing, company health insurance, widow's and old-age pensions, and no work on Saturdays, introduced in 1906. In a strike at the Singen plant in 1907, Maggi successfully mediated, accused the management of having lost "contact with the workforce" and suggested the establishment of a "workers' committee", an early form of the works council. In 1912, Maggi signed the first collective agreement in the German food industry.

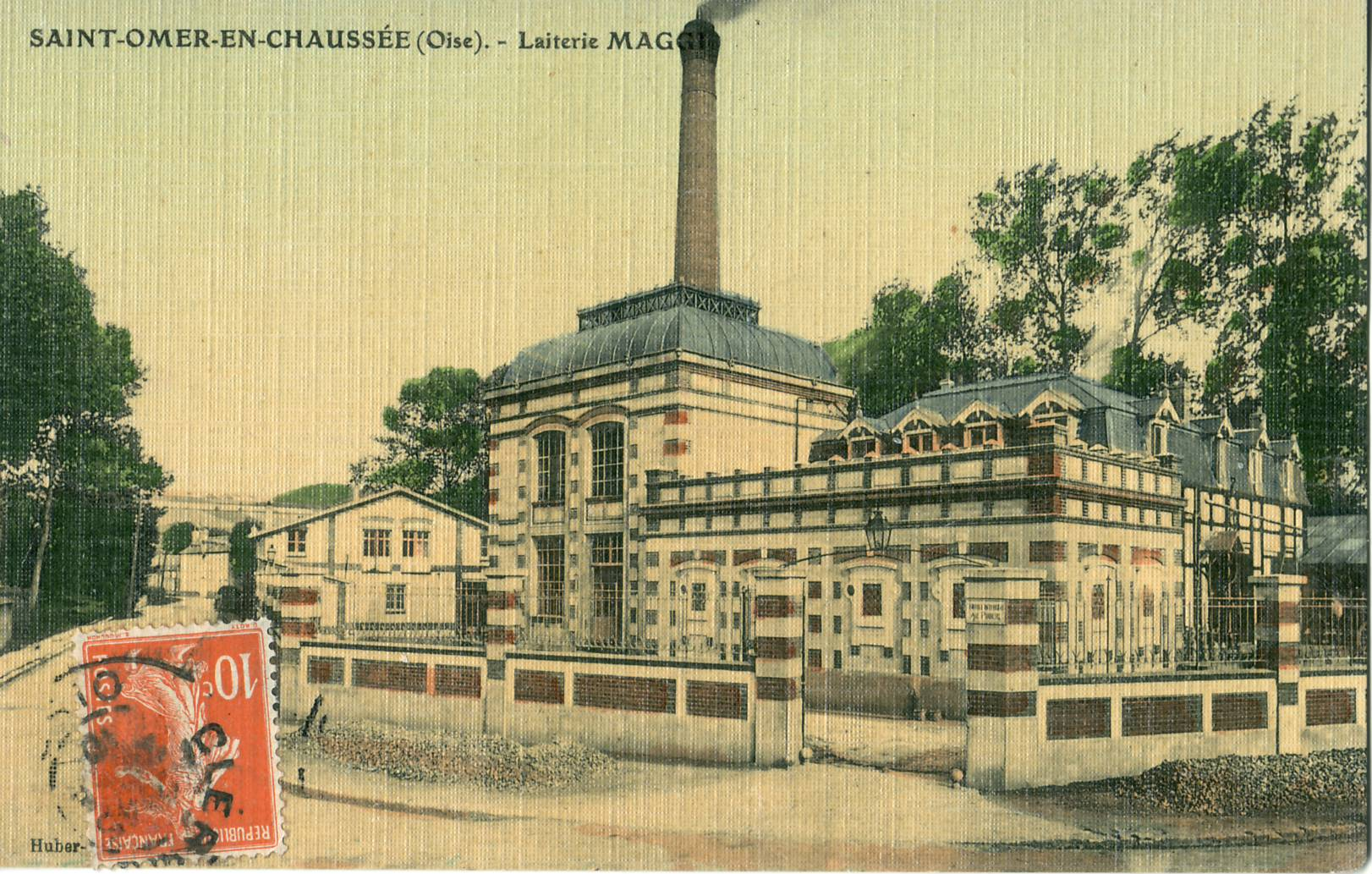
Maggi milk pasteurization factory in France

Maggi lived mainly in Paris from 1902 and led the company to great success with new products in France. The sales of pasteurized milk by the "Société laitière Maggi" amounted to 60 million liters in 1912, and the sales of bouillon cubes with the name KUB amounted to 6 million units a month in 1912.

Shortly after Julius Maggi's death in 1912, the company was converted into a holding company, the Allgemeine MAGGI-Gesellschaft.

In 1933, Maggi opened a new factory for sauce production in Le Blanc-Mesnil (France). In 1940, New Milford in the USA followed as the eleventh and last factory to be founded abroad.

=== World Wars ===
During World War I, Maggi was mistaken as a German company in France and accused of spying; it had to fight in public media and in court to correct this image. In 1919, the French branch was renamed SISA (Société industrielle des spécialités alimentaires).

During World War II, however, the German branch of Maggi allowed itself to be coopted into Nazi politics. In 1938, Maggi Berlin, and in 1940, Maggi Singen were awarded the title of "National Socialist Model Company," after the company had already had it officially certified in 1935 that "all shareholders" as well as "all managing directors, authorized signatories, and authorized representatives were of Aryan descent." This servility of Maggi towards National Socialism is ostensibly explained by the economic interest in doing business with state or municipal institutions. In order to get such orders, Maggi had to have it confirmed again and again that it was an "Aryan company." Maggi received an exclusive supply contract for the Wehrmacht, for which it even produced a special soup. Two-thirds of Maggi production went directly or indirectly to the Wehrmacht during the war years. The company was dependent on foreign labor during these years. The number of forced laborers from Eastern Europe varied between 170 (end of 1943) and 48 (May 1945).

After World War II, the German Maggi branch was saved from confiscation and dismantling only due to the intervention of the highest authorities of the Swiss Confederation in Bern and with the support of the Red Cross. The merger with Nestlé in 1947 also served to "de-Germanize" the image of Maggi.

=== Recent history ===
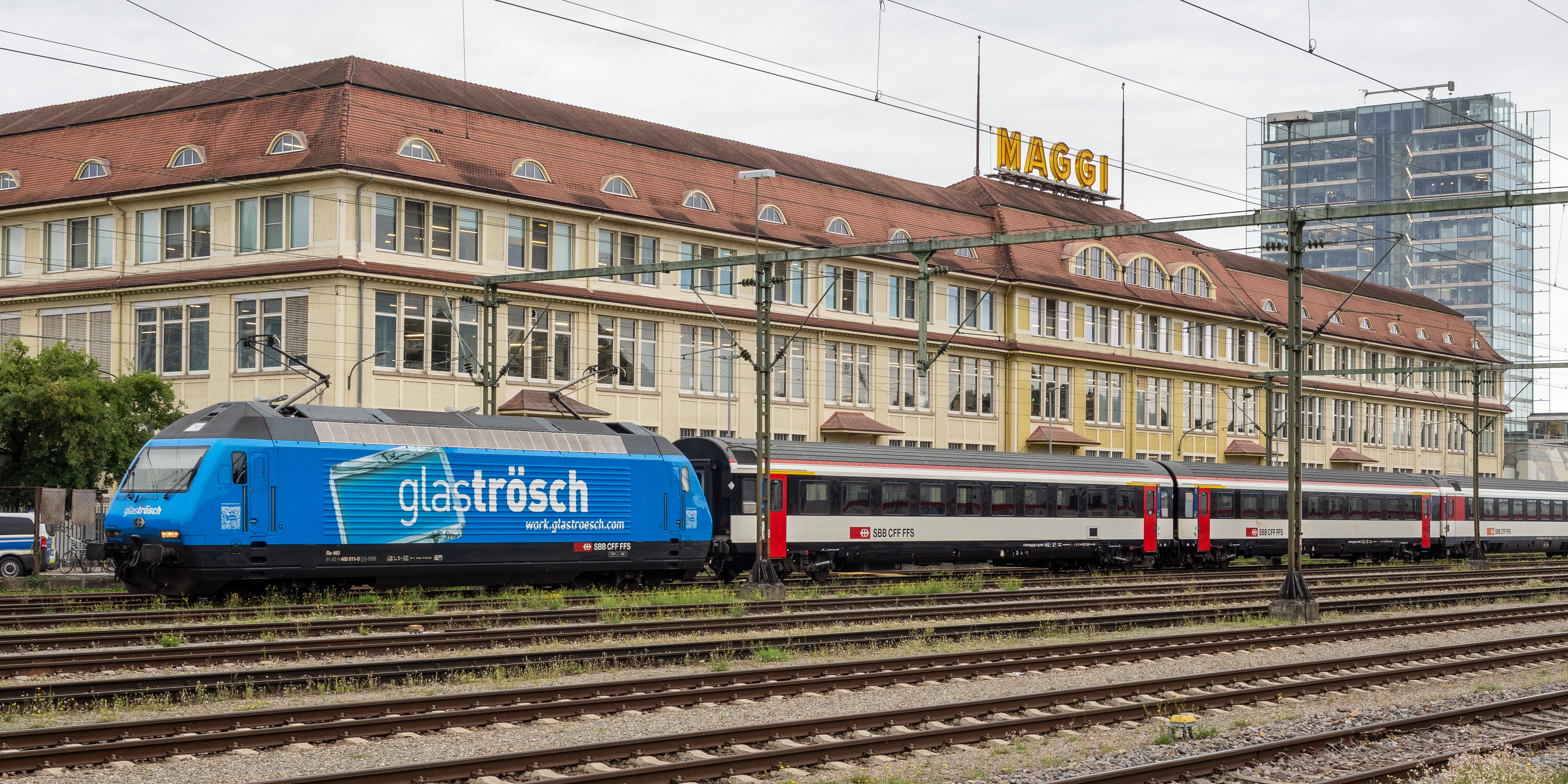
Maggi in Singen

In 1947, following several changes in ownership and corporate structure, Maggi's holding company merged with the Nestlé company to form Nestlé-Alimentana S.A., currently known in its francophone home base as Nestlé S.A.

The 1947 Maggi-Nestlé merger was not without its difficulties. There was strong animosity between the new management and the workforce. The negotiated wage at Maggi in Singen was questioned. Ludwig Erhard, who knew the then general director Riggenbach well, stated that "its economic policy would falter if Maggi continued to pay such high wages." The transfer of the commercial department from Berlin to Frankfurt in 1949 also triggered great skepticism among the workers' council.

The merger of Nestlé and Maggi took place over a period of several years and with the help of a specially created company called SOPAD (Société de produits alimentaires et diététiques). Completely different product ranges and distribution mechanisms had to be reconciled but ultimately proved complementary. As a new production site in Germany (in addition to Singen/Hohentwiel), Lüdinghausen in Münsterland was put into operation in 1964. In 1992, a production site was opened in Teutschenthal near Halle (Saale).

In 2002, Nestlé sold the Maggi site in Kemptthal, together with the flavouring production, to Givaudan.

== Marketing ==
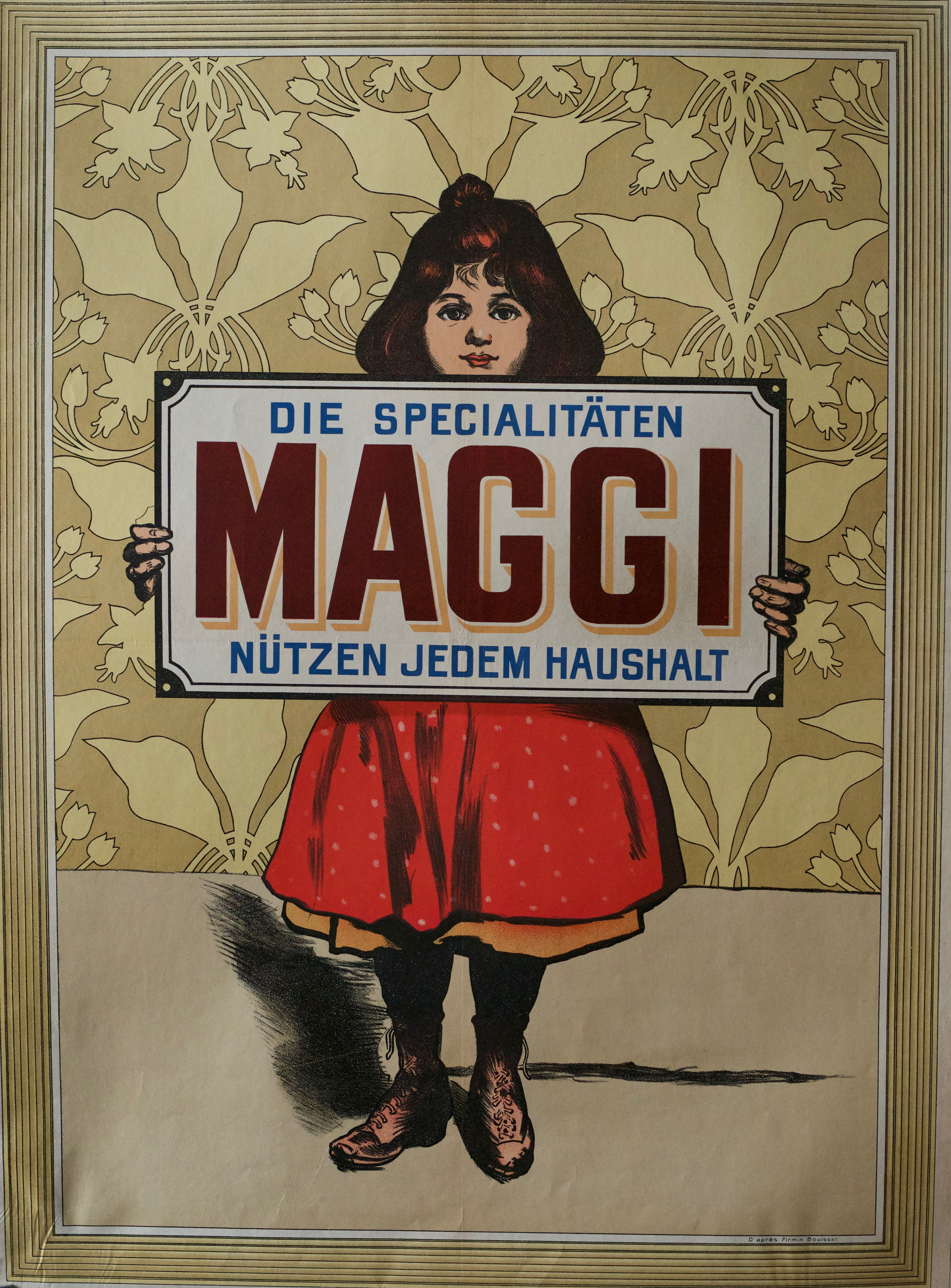
"The Maggi specialties benefit every household" advertising, c. 1900

By 2020, as part of the Simply Good initiative, the domestic Maggi range is to be geared more towards well-known and healthier ingredients and the salt content to be reduced.

== Products ==
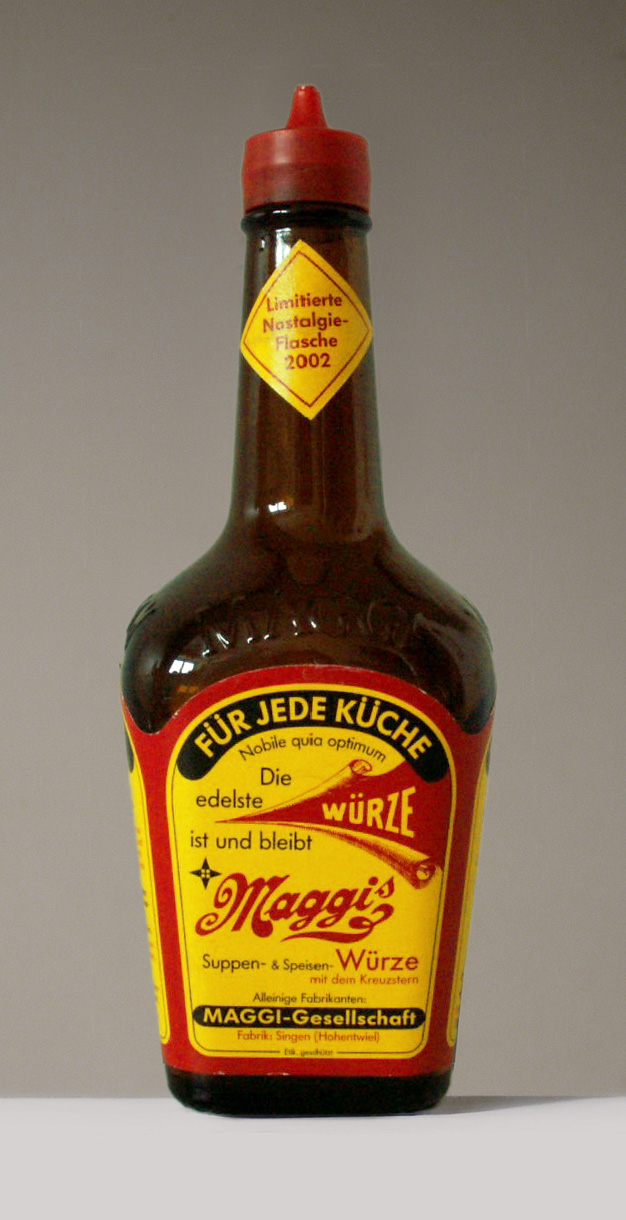
Maggi Seasoning sauce (replica of a historic bottle)

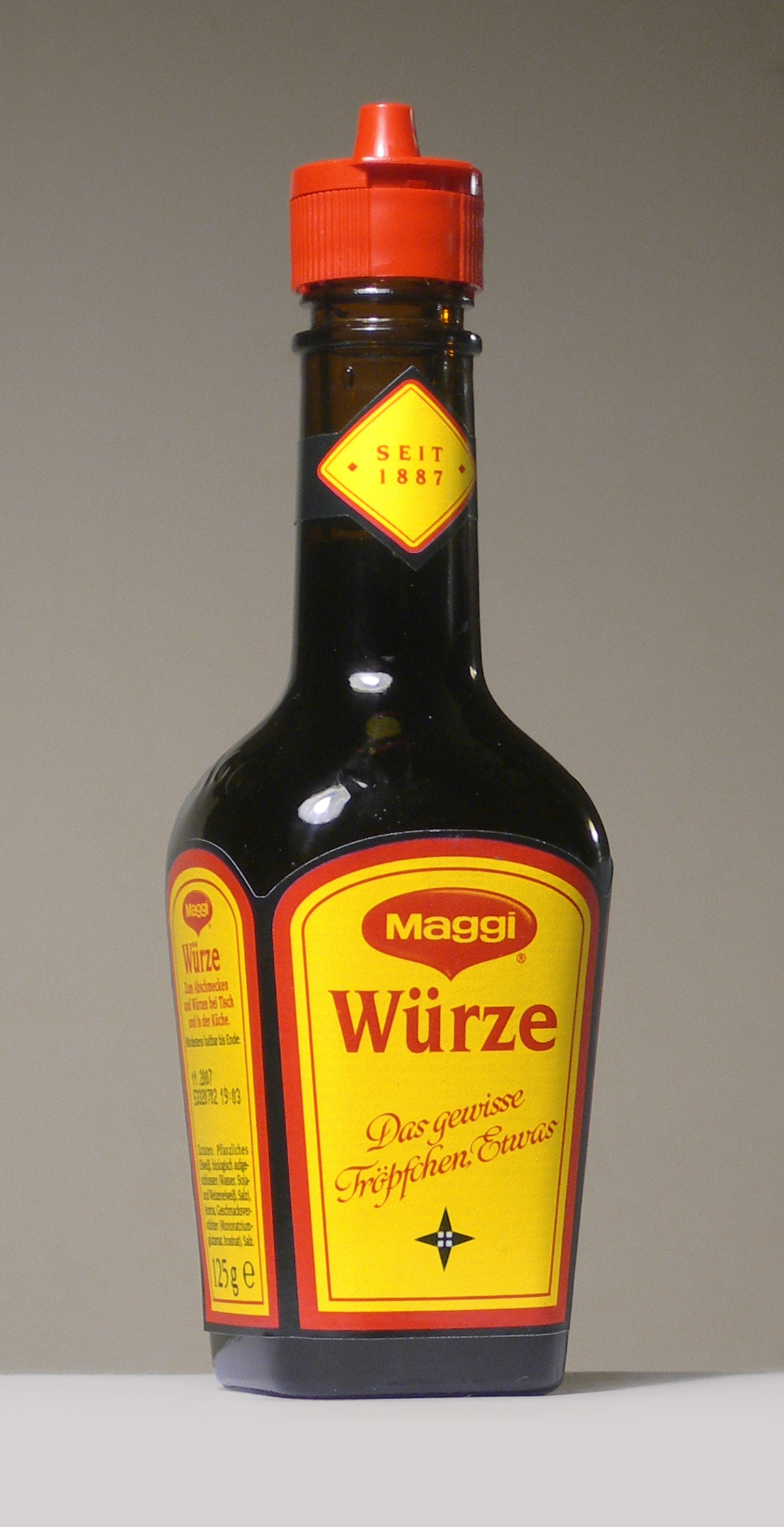
A bottle of Maggi sauce in 2006

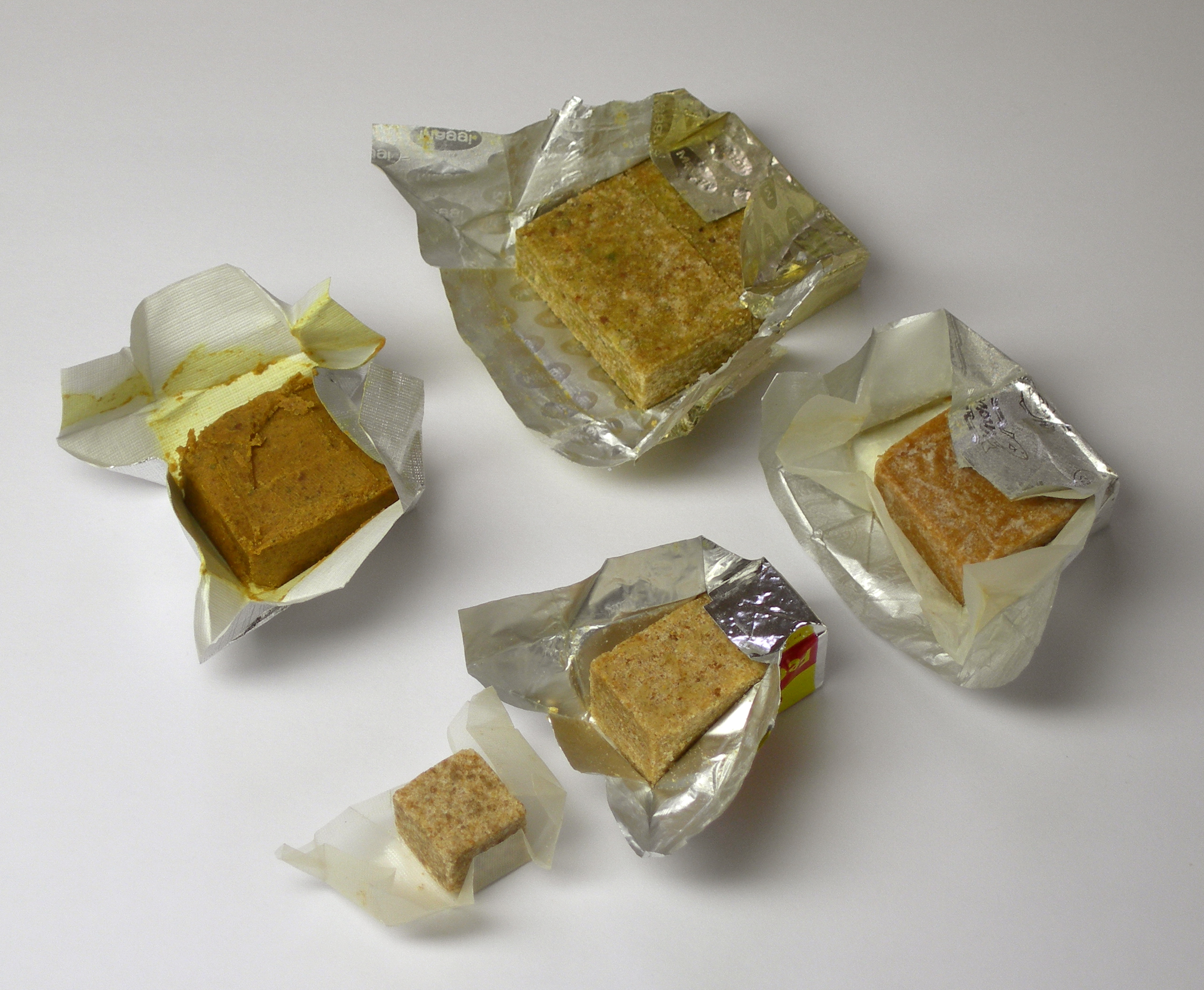
Bouillon cubes

=== Cube ===
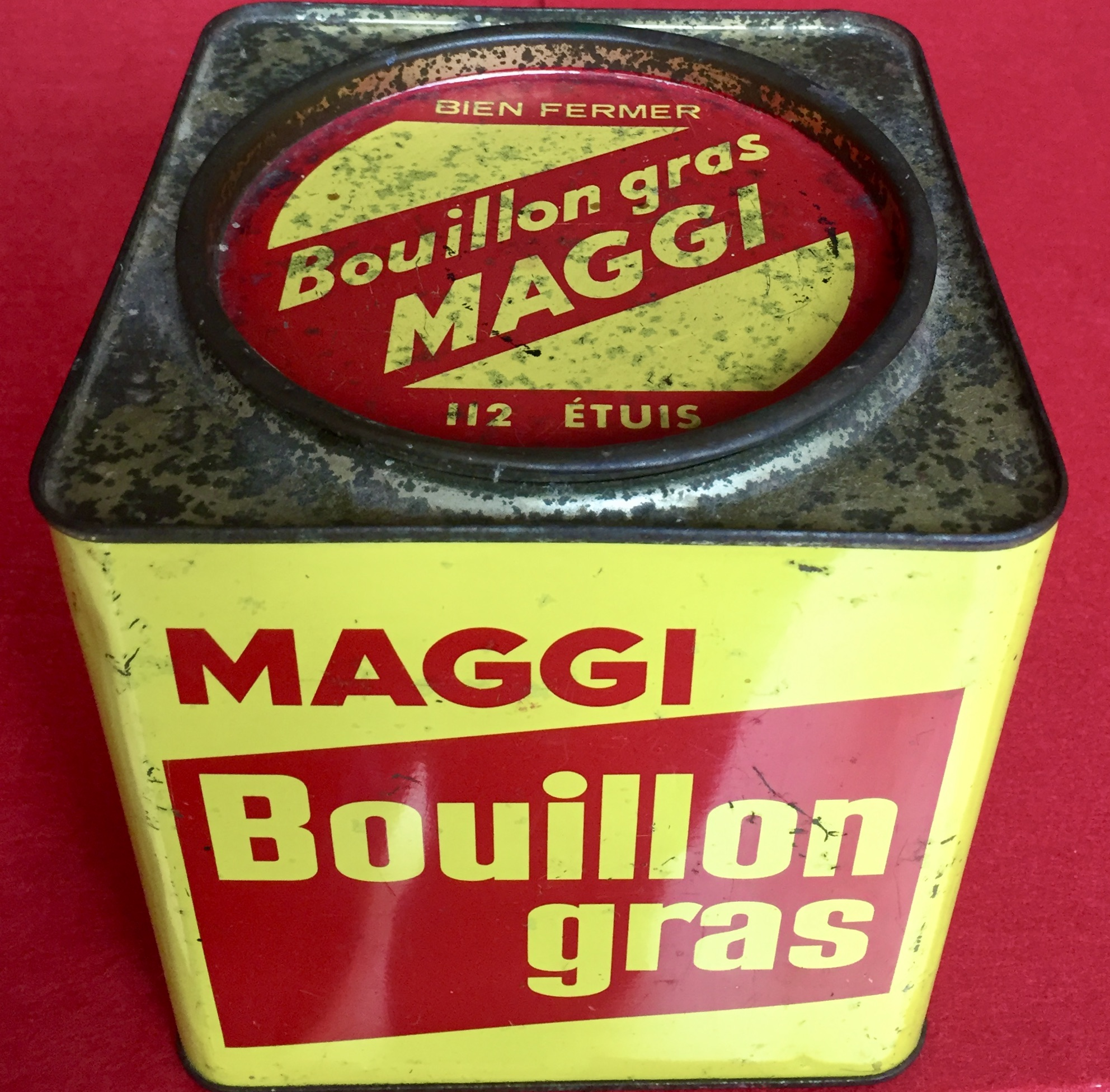
Maggi Bouillon gras

The bouillon cube or Maggi cube is a meat substitute product that was introduced in 1908.

In Germany, Cameroon, Côte d'Ivoire, Bénin, Gambia, Sénégal, Guinea, Nigeria, Ghana, Burkina Faso, Togo, Sierra Leone, Liberia, Mali, Niger, and Mauritania and parts of the Middle East, Maggi cubes are an integral part of the local cuisine. In Haiti and throughout Latin America, Maggi products, especially bouillon cubes, are widely sold with some repackaging to reflect local terminology.

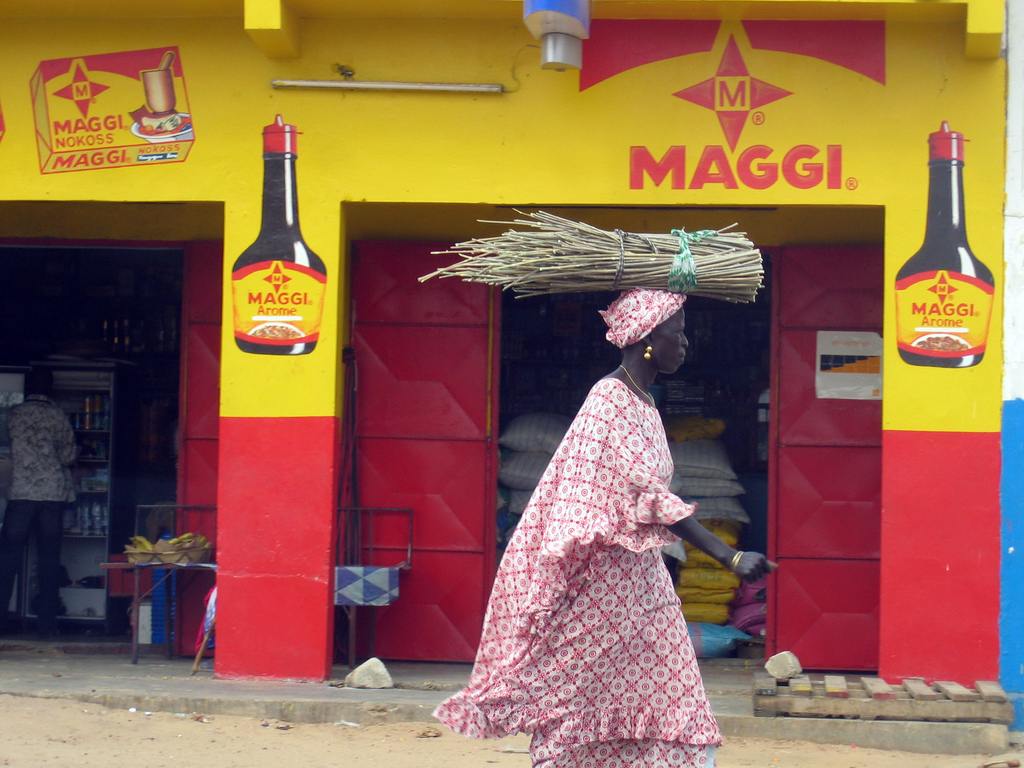
Maggi advertisement in Senegal

=== Seasoning sauce ===
In Mexico, German-speaking countries, the Netherlands, the Czech Republic, Slovakia, Slovenia, Poland and France, "Maggi" is still synonymous with Maggi-Würze (Maggi seasoning sauce), a dark, soy sauce-type hydrolysed vegetable protein-based condiment sauce. In Spain it is sold as Caldo Maggi, and in Mexico it is sold under the name Jugo Maggi.

There are a total of nine different formulations, which differ between nations and/or regions:

- Older German and Swiss Maggi use acid-hydrolyzed soy protein. Around 2006, the German product was reformulated to use enzyme-hydrolyzed wheat protein, which contains less salt. The other ingredients are monosodium glutamate, disodium inosinate, and food flavouring. European versions have generally similar taste profiles. All other versions described below are also wheat-based.
- The Chinese version, which is very common in North America, adds no MSG. Its flavour is described as more robust than the Swiss original.
- The Mexican Jugo is darker and thicker.
- Two Filipino versions exist. Maggi Savor is similar to other versions, while Maggi Savor Calamansi adds a pronounced citrus tartness.

In the German, Dutch, and Danish languages, lovage has come to be known as Maggi herb (Ger. Maggikraut, Du. maggikruid or maggiplant, Da. maggiurt), because it has an aroma similar to Maggi sauce, although lovage is not present in the sauce. This flavour of lovage is due to sotolon, whereas hydrolyzed vegetable protein contains 5-ethyl-sotolon (EHMF, "Maggi lactone").

=== Noodles ===
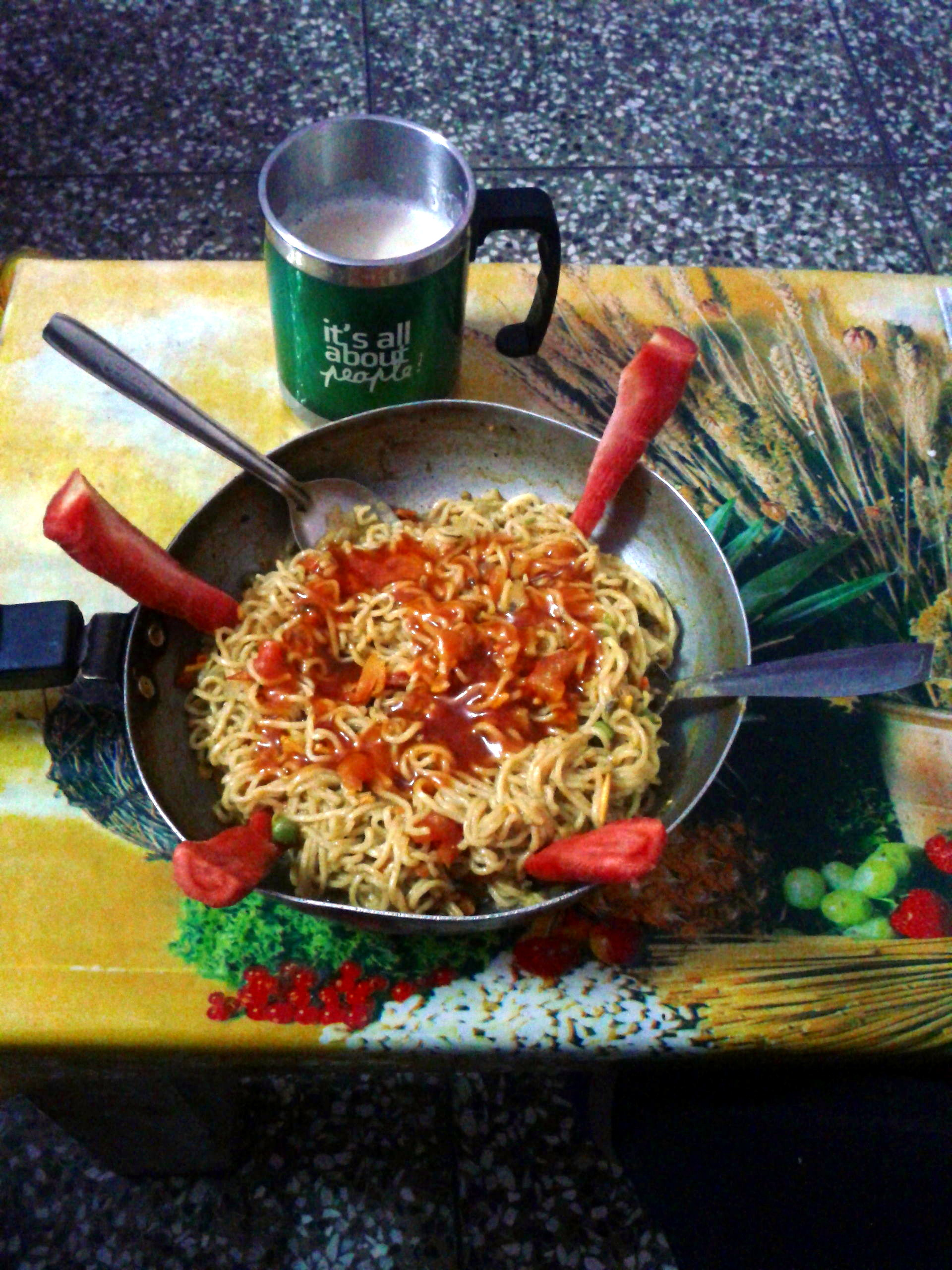
Boiled Maggi instant noodles with tea, served in India

Maggi instant noodles are popular in India, Bangladesh, South Africa, Pakistan, Singapore, Malaysia, Papua New Guinea, Australia, New Zealand, Sri Lanka, Nepal, Bhutan, and the Maldives. Nestlé has a 39% market share in Malaysia, and had 90% market share in India prior to a nationwide ban by the Food Safety and Standards Authority of India. The ban was later lifted, but market share diminished to 53%. In Malaysia and Singapore, fried noodles made from Maggi noodles are called Maggi goreng. Maggi Instant noodles are branded as "Maggi 2 Minute Noodles" in Australia, South Africa, New Zealand and India.

In India, Maggi Masala noodles carry a green dot, meaning they are specifically formulated to serve vegetarians. However, Maggi chicken noodles carry a red triangle, indicating that they are not vegetarian. This special formulation is not available in other countries, unless imported from India.

In the Philippines, localized versions of Maggi instant noodles were sold until 2011, when the product group was recalled for suspected Salmonella contamination. It did not return to market, while Nestlé continues to sell seasoning products including the popular Maggi Magic Sarap.

=== Recipe mixes ===
Recipe mixes or so-called Fixes were introduced in Germany in 1974. The product offers the consumers an idea and a recipe to cook with two or three fresh ingredients and a Maggi mix. These products were originally launched in Germany, where they became very popular, and some Western European countries. In the 1990s, recipe mixes were introduced in Eastern Europe, particularly in Russia and Poland (under the Winiary brand), where they became a big success. Nowadays, the portfolio of recipe mixes offers consumers more than a hundred recipe ideas across different European and African countries.

== Controversies ==
=== Heyne Verlag advertising ===
Heyne Verlag placed Maggi soup adverts in the body of various fictional works, including the German edition of Pyramids by Terry Pratchett. Pratchett switched publishers upon learning of this practice.

=== "Yo" lawsuit ===
In 2008, Maggi's Indian branch launched two flavors for a new "Cuppa Mania" product line, named "Masala Yo" and "Chilli Chow Yo". Moods Hospitality, which owns the "Yo! China" Chinese restaurant chain, sued Nestle for copyright infringement; Moods Hospitality initially won but Nestle appealed and was found to be not infringing in 2010, on the basis that the products were not similar enough for consumers to be confused.

=== Safety concerns ===
In May 2015, food safety regulators from Barabanki, a district of Uttar Pradesh, India reported that samples of Maggi 2 Minute Noodles had up to 17 times the permissible limit of lead, as well as unexpectedly high levels of monosodium glutamate (MSG). This finding led to multiple market withdrawals and investigations in India and beyond.

Nestlé maintained that the levels of MSG are naturally occurring, but agreed to remove the "No added MSG" label. Nestlé also questioned the reliability of the lead test, as no lead issues were found by health agencies in Singapore and the US. The Bombay High Court agreed that the test may be unreliable, and ordered a re-test in three separate laboratories. The noodles were found safe in October 2015. In addition, Nestlé insisted that testing should be done on the product as it is eaten (as opposed to testing the Tastemaker flavoring powder alone), but this argument was not accepted by the court.

In September 2026, a consumer in Kalyan, Maharashtra, alleged finding insects and worms in a packet of Maggi noodles while cooking. the packet was reported to have an expiry date of February 2027. The complaint prompted calls for the Maharashtra FDA to investigate and collect product samples for laboratory testing to determine whether the product was contaminated or otherwise affected. In response to the concerns, Nestle India said that Maggi products undergo multiple quality and food safety checks during sourcing, manufacturing and packaging, and reaffirmed its commitment to product safety and quality.

=== False advertising ===
Nestlé has faced criticism for its advertising not adhering to marketing regulations in developed countries, and for making misleading claims in developing countries. In October 2008, Nestlé aired a commercial meant for Bangladeshi television on British TV. The advert made false claims that the noodles are rich in protein and calcium and would "help to build strong muscles, bone, and hair". The British Advertising Standards Authority stated that the advertisement did not abide by the new EU consumer protection legislation, by which advertisers have to provide proof of health claims. The product in question also did not meet British Food Standards Agency thresholds for "rich in protein and calcium".

== See also ==
- List of instant noodle brands
- List of Nestlé brands
