= Bartolomeo Maggi =

Italian military surgeon

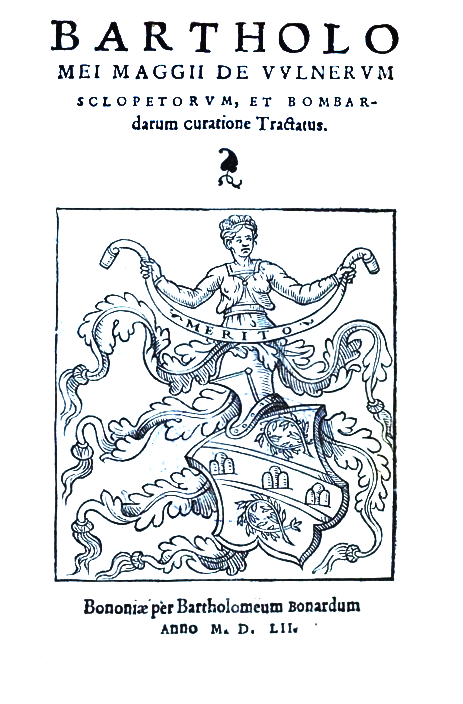
Title page of De Vulnerum Sclopetorum (1552)

Bartolomeo Maggi (Latinized as Bartholomeus Maggius) (August 1477 – 7 April 1552) was an Italian military surgeon who spent several years of his life on the battlefields treating, soothing, and healing the most desperate wounds. The experience he gained in this field lead him to write a work on surgeries in wartime De Vulnerum Sclopetorum, et Bombardarum Curatione Tractatus (1552) which was the first to deal with gunshot wounds. The Latin term Vulnus sclopetarium referring to gunshot wounds was first used by him. His work was published posthumously by his brother Giovanni Battista.

Maggi was born in Bologna, where he trained in surgery. He joined the papal army as a doctor at Rome under Pope Julius III. He served at the sieges of Parma and Mirandola and described treatments for bullet wounds and the management of amputations. Maggi noted that gunshot wounds were not damaged by gunpowder toxicity as was then held, but through damage to tissue. One of his nephews Julius Caesar Arantius (1530–1589) also became a notable surgeon.

== Life ==
According to Gaetano Marini, Bartolomeo Maggi was born in Bologna, presumably in 1476 and died in his native city in 1552, at the age of 76. There is not much certain information on his biography; in fact, there remain many doubts about his life, starting with his date of birth, for which we have very little and contradictory information.

=== Register Issue ===
Giovanni Nicolò Pasquali Aidosi reported the alleged inscription of Bartolomeo Maggi’s tombstone, located in the church of S. Francesco in Bologna, in his book ‘I dottori bolognesi di Teologia, Filosofia, Medicina e d’Arti liberali. Dall’anno 1000 per tutto Marzo del 1623’. Apparently, the tombstone states that he ‘lived seventy-five years, seven months and twenty-two days’, having died on 26 March 1552, and whose date of birth would therefore be the fourth/fifth of August. This inscription is also found in the influential work of Giovanni Alessandro Brambilla. Nicolas Eloy, a Belgian writer and physician, wrote in ‘Dizionario storico della Medicina’ that Maggi would have been born in 1477, which would coincide with the inscription of the tombstone reported by Pasquali Aidosi.

In 1858 unknown sources went directly to the site of the tombstone to verify the truthfulness of these assumptions and partly confirmed the information by the Bolognese baptismal books and wrote as follows:

‘All the most famous historians, Alidosi, Bumaldi, Orlandi, Mandosio, Astruc, Portal, Eloy and Fantuzzi, speaking of Bartolomeo Maggi, say that he was born in 1477 and died in April 1552 at the age of 75 years; and instead it has been discovered that he was baptised [in] St. Peter’s Cathedral on 26th August 1516, and since the time of his death is not in doubt, it emerges that he lived only a little over 35 years. This is […] more amply confirmed by the inscription on the grandiose sarcophagus that was erected for Maggi in the church of San Francesco, which clearly reads: qui vixit an[ni] XXXV mens[es] VII dies XXII and not an[ni] LXXV as reported by Portal, Brambilla and Fantuzzi; hence the error derived from the wrong copry of the inscription.’

Thus, the shift of the birth date forward to 1517 implies that Maggi had lived just a bit more than 35 years, and would also explain the lack of information about the doctor until 1541.

=== The Roman Period ===
According to Giovanni Fantuzzi, Bolognese historian, Bartolomeo Maggi 'had been appointed to the reading of surgery in the year 1541 and held this office until the year 1552, year in which he died'.

Most of the eighteenth and nineteenth-century biographers stated that Maggi sojourned in Rome at the papal court for a relatively short period of time. During this time Maggi 'acquired such a great reputation that Pope Julius the third' who made him his doctor, and was praised by Henry II, King of France.

As already mentioned Maggi's roman sojourn was apparently very short due to a future illness; it is indeed known that the physician 'was the doctor of Julius III, raised to the papacy in 1550 and died in his home town in 1552'.

In addition to being the pope's physician, Maggi met and treated Johannes Baptista Montanus during the siege of Parma. The man was leading the papal army and was the pope's nephew. Even if we are not convinced that Maggi was the pope's personal physician, we are certain that he was in contact with the papal familia.

== De Vulnerum Sclopetorum ==
Bartolomeo Maggi had been the founder of Italian military surgery thanks to his studies and numerous battlefield experiences despite his short life. The only work attributable to the Bolognese physician is the De Vulnerum Sclopetorum et Bombardarum curatione Tractatus, published posthumously in Bologna by his brother Giovanni Battista. The work can be seen as a key step in resolving the 16th century querelle on the poisonous potential of the firearms.

=== On The Nature of Gunpowder ===
With the complete novelty of gunpowder on the European military scene, the medicine of the time had to carefully analyse the actual nature of wounds caused by firearms in order to formulate a hypothesis for treatment. A large number of doctors were convinced that the lethality of these weapons was due to the heat concomitant to the shots. Following this hypothesis, the wounds should be treated as if they had been burns. Other doctors, however, identified traces of poison in the gunshot wounds: heated gunpowder was considered a dangerous toxicant. Maggi, who then proposed his own cure and effective drug for gunshot wounds, departed from the analogy-based beliefs of traditional medicine without experimental control.

Regarding the belief that gunshot wounds were harmful due to the heat potential of bullets, Maggi categorically denied that the injuries were similar to those caused by burns. During the siege of Mirandola in 1551, Maggi, who was called there to treat Johannes Baptista Montanus, nephew of Pope Julius III and praefectus of his militia, had the occasion to treat numerous wounds of papal soldiers. He himself wrote that he had found no one among the wounded 'who in the same blow said to have felt warmth, but well a certain contusion, as if from some beam, or other similar ruination had received a blow'. Moreover, in none of the cases that Maggi saw, did the bullets leave any trace of a burn but the only obvious effects of the wound consisted of a contusion, an ecchymosis. In addition to the Bolognese surgeon's experience, his justification for excluding the possibility that the exploded bullet carried its own heat capable of causing damage was the common experience that a bullet fired into the hay did not cause any fire. Despite the many other examples and references in the work, some physicians and intellectuals kept on believing in the burning potential of bullets, trying to justify the burns on the skin and the failure to burn clothes by relying on the Aristotelian physics of the Meteorology.

In addition to the deep-rooted belief that gunshot wounds were the result of damage due to burning flesh and the allegedly high temperature of the bullets, it was widely believed that such wounds were also poisonous and should be treated accordingly. Maggi, however, was in no way convinced of the possibility that the gunpowder injuries were poisonous. He placed the emphasis on the chemical composition of the gunpowder in the first place: none of the elements contained could be considered poisonous; how then could the whole become so? The components listed were sulphur, saltpeter and willow or hazel charcoal, with the addition of camphor, schnapps and vinegar. Many of these substances were already used in ancient times for a wide variety of curative purposes. Sulphur, for example, was favoured by Galen (2nd century AD) for the treatment of mange, leprosy and as an antidote for the bites of poisonous animals. Saltpeter used in the preparation of explosive powder, on the other hand, was not analyzed in ancient works because nitro was prepared in a different way, and yet Maggi reiterated that - after all - the starting material was the same, and from this he could confidently assert that this substance was harmless.

The belief that gunshot wounds were poisonous was, as we have seen, completely unfounded. However, it was undeniable that the outward appearance of the wounds could resemble the deleterious effects of poison.

The danger of these wounds was, however, to be found in the bruises and accumulations of dead flesh that could cause gangrene or putrefaction, altering (according to the Hippocratic-Galenic assumption) the balance of the body's internal humours.

== Bibliography ==
- Pandolfi, Simone (2016-09-12). La chirurgia militare nel Cinquecento: Fra tradizione e novità: Ambroise Parè e Bartolomeo Maggi (in Italian). Soldiershop Publishing. ISBN 978-88-9327-123-3.
- Partin, C (2018). "Vulnus sclopetarium (gunshot wound)". Proc (Bayl Univ Med Cent). 31: 231–234. doi:10.1080/08998280.2018.1444299. PMC 5914396. PMID 29706831..
- Nakayama, Don K (2020). "Vesalius: Surgeon to Monarchs". The American Surgeon. 86 (3): 173–175. doi:10.1177/000313482008600323.
- Bir, SC; Ambekar, S; Kukreja, S; Nanda, A (2015). "Julius Caesar Arantius (Giulio Cesare Aranzi, 1530-1589) and the hippocampus of the human brain: history behind the discovery". J Neurosurg. 122: 971–5. doi:10.3171/2014.11.JNS132402. PMID 25574573..
- Marini, Gaetano (1784). Degli archiatri pontificii... (in Italian). nella stamperia Pagliarini.
- Pandolfi, Simone (2016-02-14). Corti al vetriolo: Veleni e medici nel rinascimento italiano (in Italian). Soldiershop Publishing. ISBN 978-88-9327-036-6.
- Bullettino delle scienze mediche (in Italian). Società e Scuola medica chirurgica di Bologna. 1876.
- Orlandi, Pellegrino Antonio (1714). Notizie degli scrittori bolognesi e dell' opere loro stampate e manoscritte (in Italian). C. Pisarri.
- Eloy, Nicolas Francois Joseph (1761). Dizionario storico della medicina, che contiene l'origine, i progressi di quest'arte, le sette che vi sono sorte, i nomi de' medici, e scrittori più celebri, i loro sentimenti, e le scoperte ... Composto in francese dal signor Eloy e ora nell'italiana favella accresciuto di correzioni, di annotazioni, colla giunta di quantità di nuovi articoli. ... Tomo 1. [-7. ed ultimo]: 1 (in Italian). Per Benedetto Gessari.
- Gazzetta medica di Roma (in Italian). Armanni. 1889.
- Renzi, Salvatore de De (1845). Storia della medicina Italiana (in Italian). Filiatre-Sebezio.
