= Maggie (astronomy) =

Molecular cloud in the Milky Way galaxy

Nebula
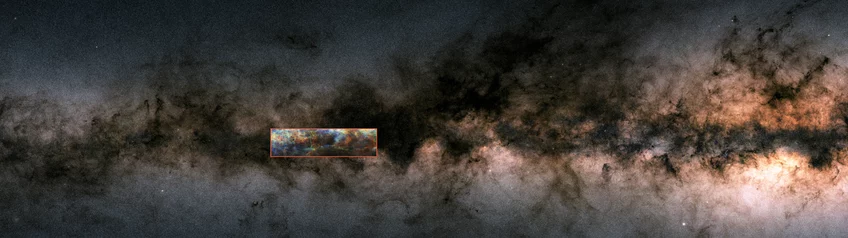
- Image of Maggie as seen by the Gaia satellite.

Observation data
- Distance: 55,000 ly

Physical characteristics
- Radius: 3,900 ly

Maggie is a vast cloud of hydrogen gas observed within our own Milky Way galaxy. It is a filament of hydrogen 3,900 light-years long and 130 light-years wide. It is a single coherent structure with all parts showing similar velocity with respect to the local standard of rest. It is one of the biggest structures within the Milky Way. "Maggie" is located about 55,000 light-years away (on the other side of the Milky Way). Maggie contains eight percent molecular hydrogen by mass fraction; the rest being atomic hydrogen. It is hoped the cloud will provide clues to one of the earliest stages of star formation.

It was first named by Colombian astronomer Juan D. Soler, an astrophysicist affiliated with the Istituto Nazionale di Astrofisica in Rome, Italy. He named it after the longest river in his native country, the Río Magdalena (Anglicized: Margaret, or "Maggie"). Astronomers discovered the cloud as part of The HI/OH/Recombination line survey of the Milky Way (THOR). It was first described in December 2021 in the journal Astronomy & Astrophysics.
