= Margaret W. Weston =

Margaret Woodward Weston, known as "Maggi", is an American photography collector and promoter who started one of the first commercial art galleries in the United States devoted solely to photography.

== Biography ==
Weston was born Margaret Woodward in England and raised in South Africa. In 1956 she came to New York City to pursue a career in singing, and soon thereafter she moved to Los Angeles because of the growing theatrical scene in that city. By chance she took a trip to Big Sur and fell in love with the area. She moved there and became involved in the amateur theater productions at the State Theater in Monterey. It was there that she met her future husband Cole Weston, who directed her in a play. Cole was the son of famed photographer Edward Weston and was responsible for making authorized prints of Edward's photographs after his death. Maggi is quoted as saying "Edward's prints drove me to tears, and I knew photography was my calling."

The two married in 1963. At the time photography had a limited value in the art market, but over the next decade Weston watched the market slowly grow while learning the intricacies of what makes a quality photograph. Through her husband she met and became friends with a wide circle of important photographers that included Ansel Adams, Wynn Bullock and Imogen Cunningham.

Her marriage ended in 1975, and although she had benefited from the knowledge and experience she gained as part of the Weston household she received only a few Weston prints as part of the divorce. Needing a job to support herself, she made the then risky decision to open a gallery that would sell only photography. She asked Adams to provide her with some of his prints to launch her collection, and he both honored her request and helped her find a gallery space in the nearby small town of Carmel-by-the-Sea, California. His prints became her opening exhibit, which was described as "a sell-out, with lines stretching for blocks."

That same year Adams decided to stop making new prints from his old negatives, and Weston took out a bank loan to secure one last batch of prints for her gallery. Her timing was opportune, for soon after the market for fine art photography began to rise. In 1980 Weston and Adams together came up with the idea for a "Museum Set" of Adams' photographs. She mortgaged her house to come up with money to help finance the project, but as a result she added a large number of Adams' prints to her collection. Their individual and collective value rose significantly during the next 20 years, and she sold many at substantial profits.

Over the years Weston became a shrewd and obsessive collector, buying both then little-known prints from 19th century photographers and important images from 20th century masters of the art. She was an early collector of Jerry Uelsmann, Ralph Gibson, Michael Kenna, Joel-Peter Witkin and Adam Fuss, and she helped build their reputations by placing their work in important corporate collections like the Gilman Paper Company, Pacific Bell, Mitsubishi, and the Southland Corporation. She also advised the curators at the Museum of Modern Art, San Francisco Museum of Modern Art and the Victoria and Albert Museum.

In 2007 Weston sold the bulk of her private collection at Sotheby's in New York. Included in the sale was one of only two known prints of Edward Weston's The Ascent of Attic Angles (1923), which sold for $824,000. Maggi Weston originally bought the print at Sotheby's in 1979 for $2,500. Other important prints that sold that evening included Carleton Watkins' The Garrison, Columbia River (1867) - $492,000, Man Ray's Noire et Blanche (1926, printed c1935) - $396,000, Imogen Cunningham's Amphitheatre No. 2 (1920s) - $348,000, Edward Weston's The White Iris (1921 ) - $340,000, and Paul Strand's Boat Houses, Wolf River, Gaspe Quebec (1936) - $336,000. Overall the sale realized $7,819,700, including the buyer's premium.
