= Julius Maggi =

Swiss businessman; founder of Maggi

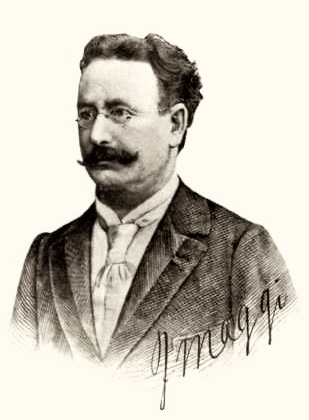
Julius Maggi around 1900

Julius Michael Johannes Maggi (9 October 1846 – 19 October 1912) was a Swiss entrepreneur, inventor of precooked soups and Maggi sauce. He is best known for founding Maggi, which was merged with Nestlé in 1947.

== Biography ==
Julius was born in Frauenfeld, Switzerland on 9 October 1846. In 1869, he inherited his father's hammer mill.

He died on 19 October 1912 at the age of 66.

== Career ==
In the early 1880s, Julius began experimenting to invent a new type of flour. In 1882, he finally began selling flour and founded Maggi. In 1886, he launched Maggi seasoning.

In 1886, Julius invented the first instant soup in the world. It was invented in his Kemptthal factory.

By 1888, he began selling to countries all around Europe, including Germany, France, and Italy.

== Gallery ==
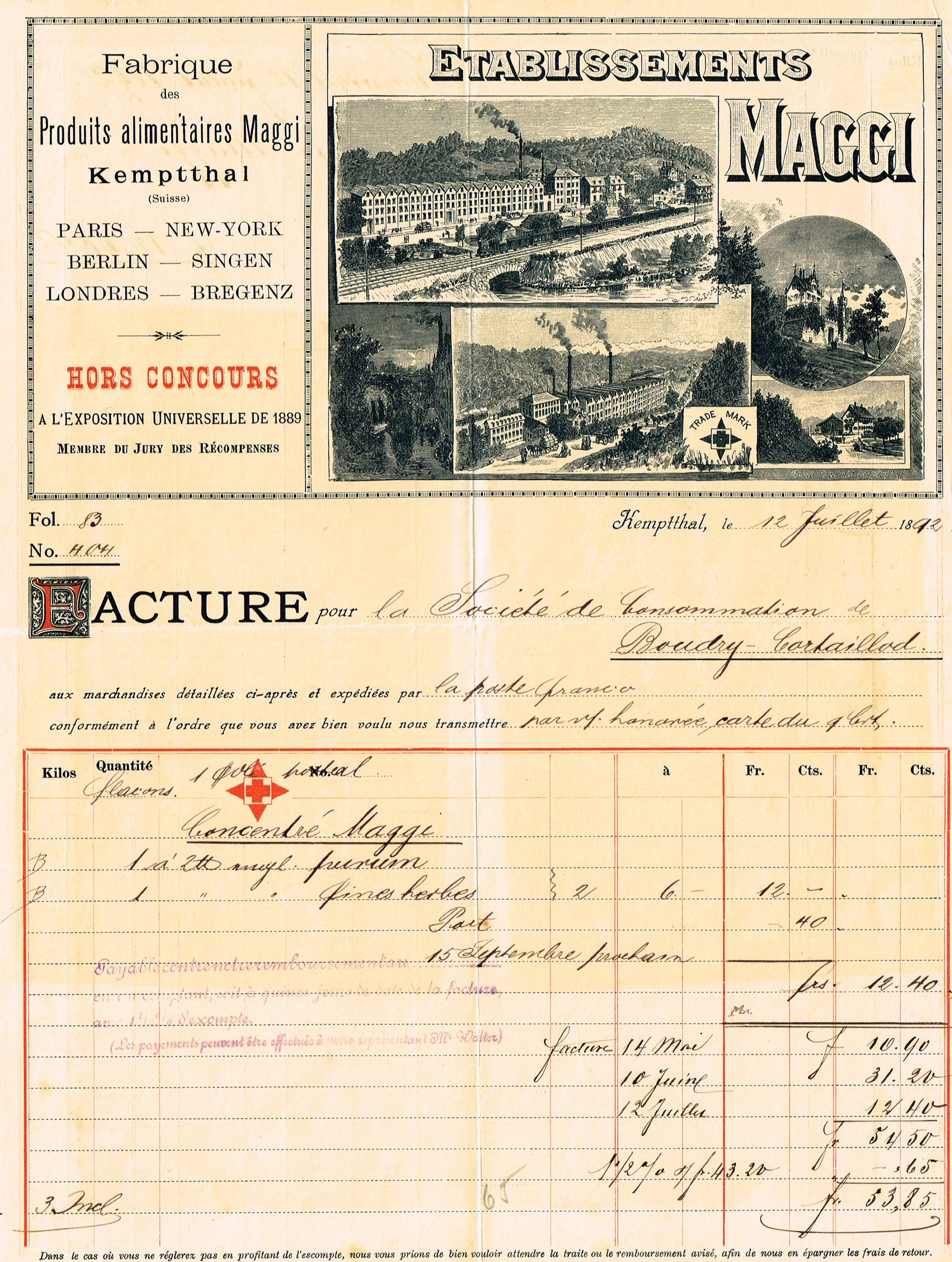
Bill of the Fabrik von Maggi's Nahrungsmitteln AG, issued 12. July 1892; exposed by Julius Maggi

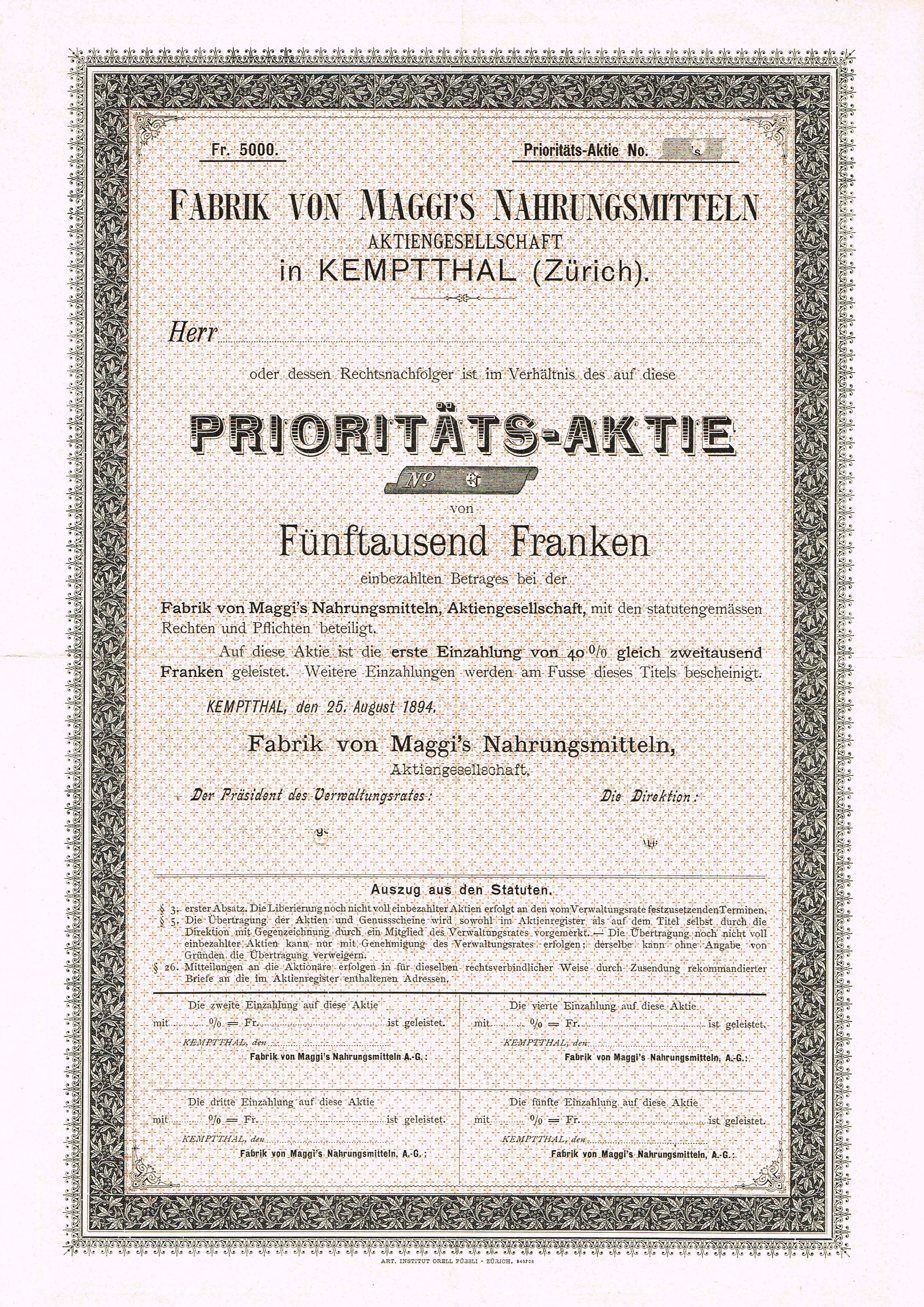
Share of the Fabrik von Maggi's Nahrungsmitteln AG, issued 25. August 1894; oldest known share of this company

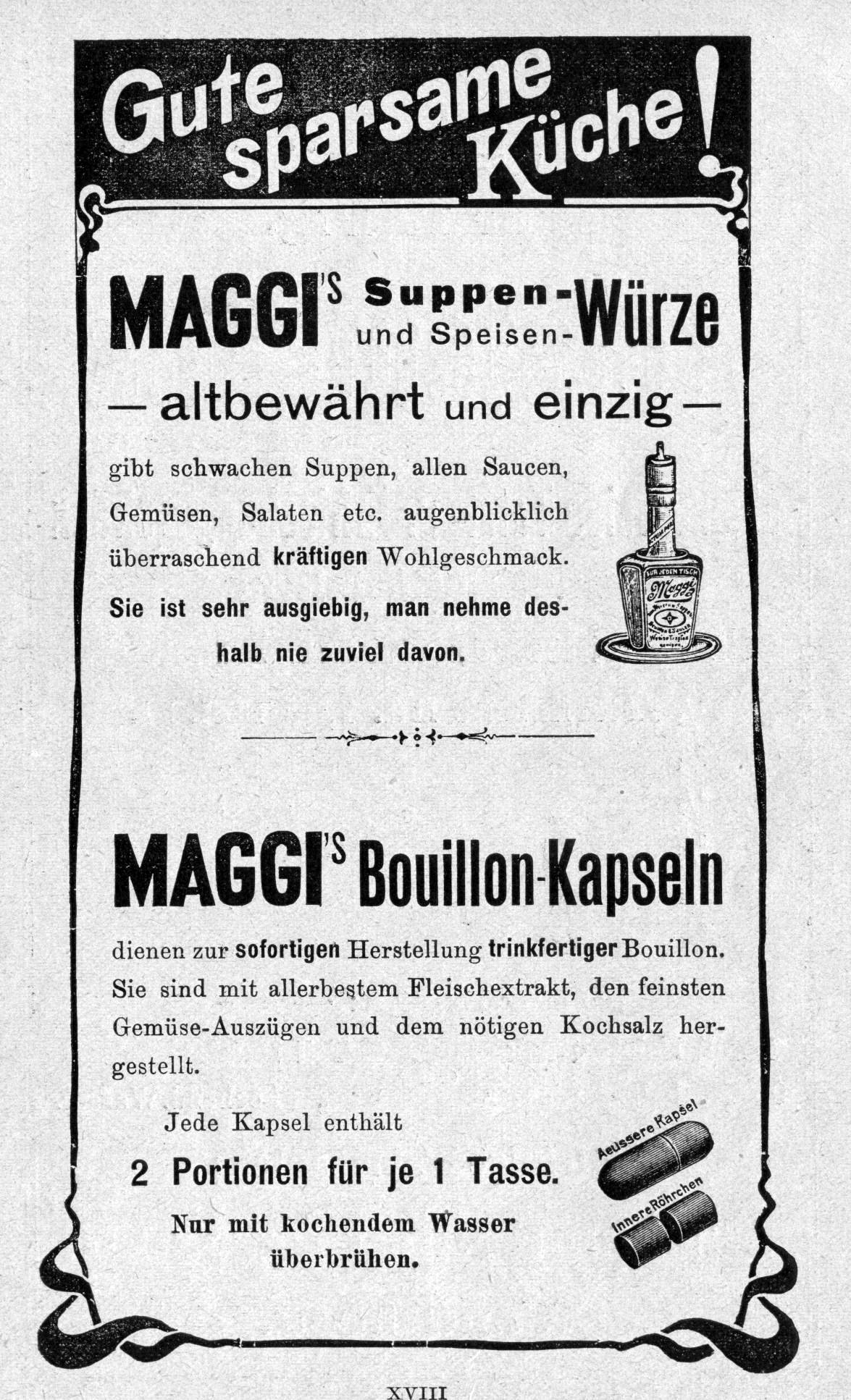
Advertisement for Maggi 1903

== See also ==
- Portable soup
