= Glutamate dehydrogenase (NAD(P)+) =

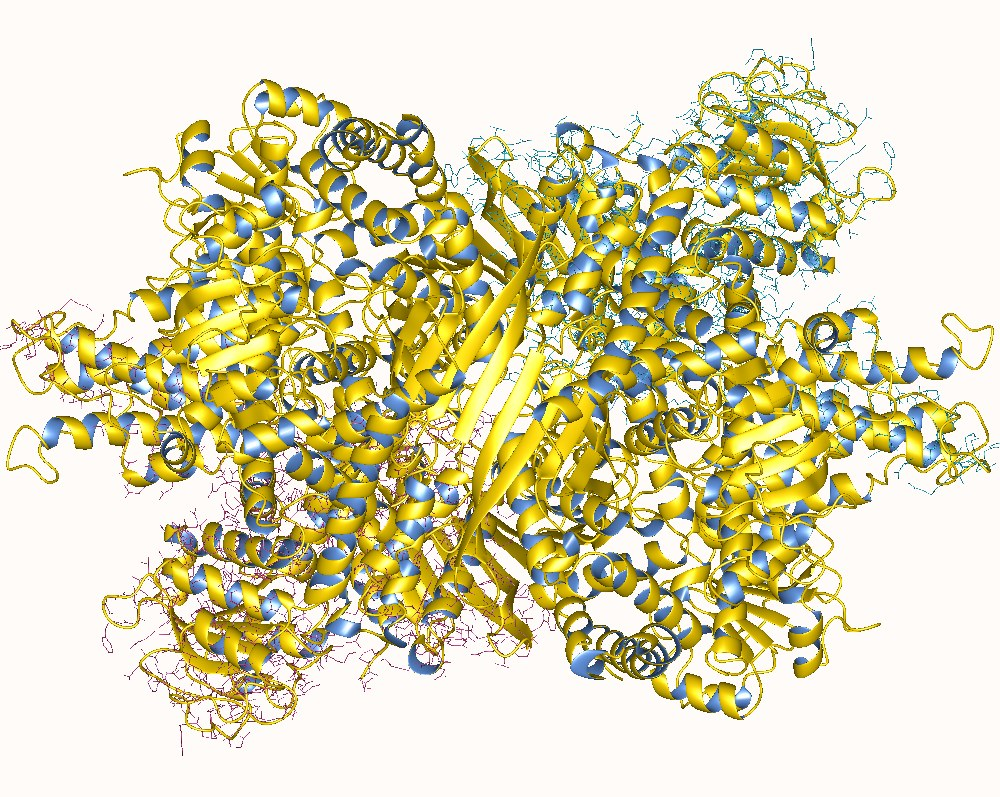
- glutamate dehydrogenase hexamer, Human

Identifiers
- EC no.: 1.4.1.3
- CAS no.: 2604152

Databases
- BRENDA: enzyme data
- ExPASy: NiceZyme view
- KEGG: enzyme entry
- MetaCyc: metabolic pathway
- Rhea: reactions
- PDB structures: RCSB PDB PDBe PDBsum
Search
- PMC: articles
- PubMed: articles
- NCBI: proteins

Glutamate dehydrogenase (NAD(P)+) (EC 1.4.1.3, glutamic dehydrogenase, glutamate dehydrogenase [NAD(P)+]) is an enzyme with systematic name L-glutamate:NAD(P)+ oxidoreductase (deaminating). This enzyme is a type of glutamate dehydrogenase that is distinguished from other types by being able to use either NAD+/NADH or NADP+/NADPH as a cofactor. It is found in the mitochondria of humans encoded by the genes GLUD1 and GLUD2. It catalyses the following chemical reaction

L-Glutamic acid
+ NAD^{+}
H_{2}O
H^{+}
H_{2}O
H^{+}
α-Ketoglutaric acid
+ NADH + NH_{3}

The enzyme converts L-glutamic acid to α-ketoglutaric acid, with loss of ammonia, using oxidised nicotinamide adenine dinucleotide as its cofactor. It can also use nicotinamide adenine dinucleotide phosphate.
