= Glutamate flavoring =

Generic name for flavor-enhancing compounds based on glutamic acid and its salts

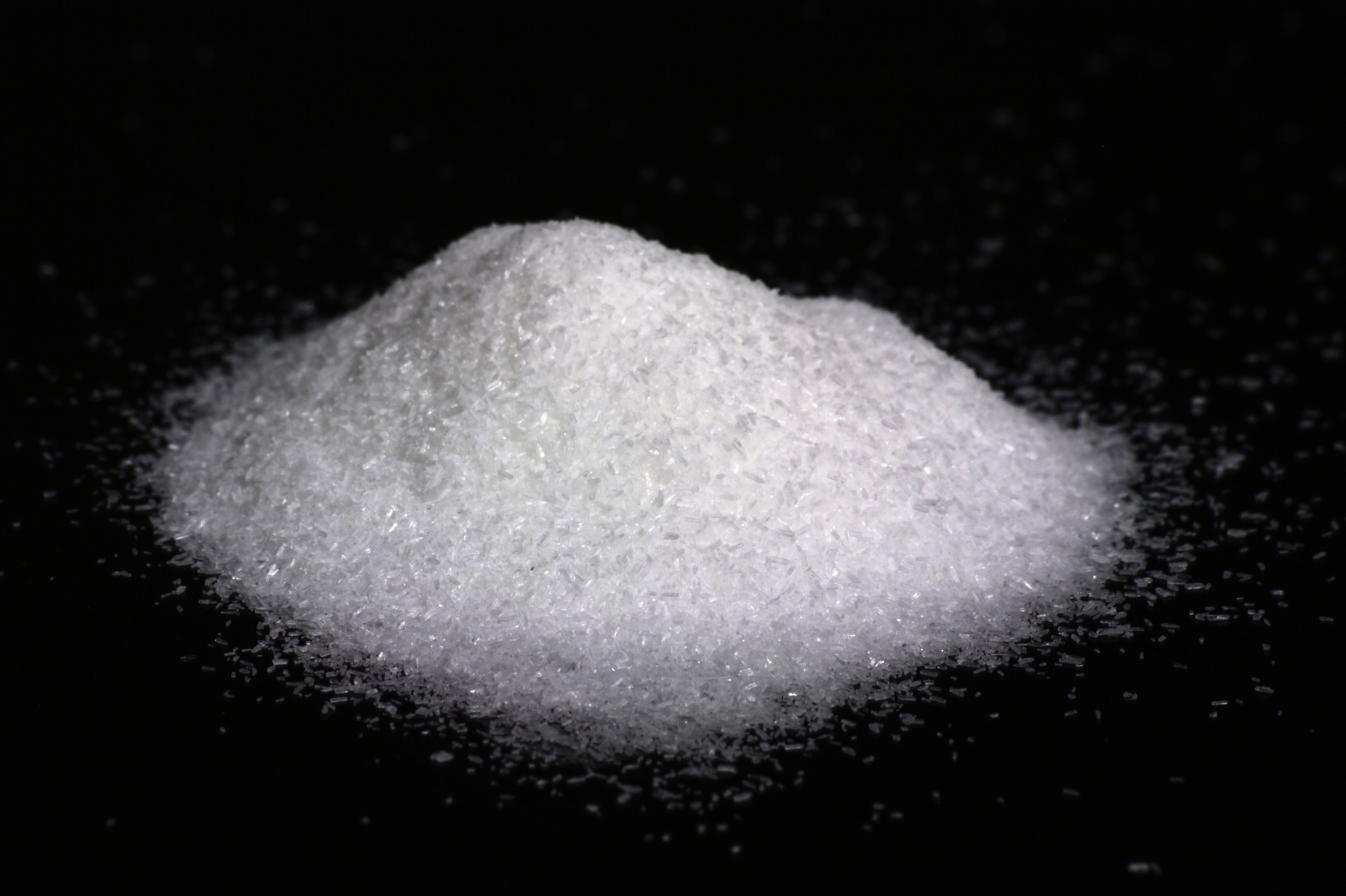
Crystalline monosodium glutamate (MSG)

Glutamate flavoring is the generic name for flavor-enhancing compounds based on glutamic acid and its salts (glutamates). These compounds provide a savory taste to food.

Glutamic acid and glutamates are natural constituents of many fermented or aged foods, including soy sauce, fermented bean paste, and cheese. They can also be found in hydrolyzed proteins such as yeast extract. The sodium salt of glutamic acid, monosodium glutamate (MSG), is manufactured on a large scale and widely used in the food industry.

== Glutamic acid versus glutamates ==
When glutamic acid or any of its salts are dissolved in water, they form a solution of separate negative ions, called glutamates, and positive ions like H_{3}O^{+} or Na^{+}. The result is a chemical equilibrium among several ionized forms, including zwitterions, that depends on the pH (acidity) of the solution. Within the common pH range of foods, the prevailing ion can be described as ^{−}OOC-C(NH^{+}_{3})-(CH_{2})_{2}-COO^{−}, which has an electric charge of −1.

Only the glutamate ion is responsible for the umami flavor, so the effect does not depend significantly on the starting compound. However, some crystalline salts such as monosodium glutamate dissolve much better and faster than crystalline glutamic acid. This has proven to be an important factor in the implementation of substances as flavor enhancers.

== Discovery ==
Although they occur naturally in many foods, glutamic acid and other amino acid flavor contributions were not scientifically identified until the early twentieth century. In 1866, the German chemist Karl Heinrich Ritthausen discovered and identified the compound. In 1907, Japanese researcher Kikunae Ikeda of the Tokyo Imperial University identified brown crystals left behind after the evaporation of a large amount of kombu broth as glutamic acid. These crystals, when tasted, reproduced a flavor detected in many foods, especially seaweed. Professor Ikeda coined the term umami for this flavor. He then patented a method of mass-producing the crystalline salt of glutamic acid known as monosodium glutamate.

== Isomers ==
Further research into the compound has found that only the L-glutamate enantiomer has flavor-enhancing properties. Manufactured monosodium glutamate consists to over 99.6% of the naturally predominant L-glutamate form, which is a higher proportion of L-glutamate than can be found in the free glutamate ions of fermented naturally occurring foods. Fermented products such as soy sauce, steak sauce, and Worcestershire sauce have levels of glutamate similar to those in foods with added monosodium glutamate. However, 5% or more of the glutamate may be the D-enantiomer. Nonfermented naturally occurring foods have lower relative levels of D-glutamate than fermented products do.

== Taste perception ==
Structures of inosine-5'-monophosphate (top) and guanosine-5'-monophosphate (bottom).

Glutamic acid stimulates specific receptors located in taste buds such as the amino acid receptor T1R1/T1R3 or other glutamate receptors like the metabotropic receptors (mGluR4 and mGluR1), which induce the flavor known as umami. This is classified as one of the five basic tastes (the word "umami" is a loanword from Japanese; it is also referred to as "savory" or "meaty").

The flavoring effect of glutamate comes from its free form, in which it is not bound to other amino acids in protein. Nonetheless, glutamate by itself does not elicit an intense umami taste. The mixing of glutamate with nucleotides inosine-5'-monophosphate (IMP) or guanosine-5'-monophosphate (GMP) enhances the taste of umami; T1R1 and T1R3 respond primarily to mixtures of glutamate and nucleotides. While research has shown that this synergism occurs in some animal species with other amino acids, studies of human taste receptors show that the same reaction only occurs between glutamate and the selected nucleotides. Moreover, sodium in monosodium glutamate may activate glutamate to produce a stronger umami taste.

Two hypotheses for the explanation of umami taste transduction have been introduced: the first posits that the umami taste is transduced by an N-methyl-D-aspartate (NMDA) type glutamate ion channel receptor; the second posits that the taste is transduced by a metabotropic type glutamate receptor (taste-mGluR4). The metabotropic glutamate receptors such as mGluR4 and mGluR1 can be easily activated at glutamate concentration levels found in food.

=== Perceptual independence from salty and sweet taste ===
Since umami taste compounds are frequently sodium salts, the perceptual differentiation of salty and umami tastes has been difficult in taste tests and studies have found as much as 27% of certain populations may be umami "hypotasters".

Furthermore single glutamate (glutamic acid) with no table salt ions (Na+) elicits sour taste and in psychophysical tests, sodium or potassium salt cations seem to be required to produce a perceptible umami taste.

Sweet and umami tastes both utilize the taste receptor subunit T1R3, with salt taste blockers reducing discrimination between monosodium glutamate and sucrose in rodents.

If umami lacks perceptual independence, it could be classified with other tastes like fat, carbohydrate, metallic, and calcium, which can be perceived at high concentrations but may not offer a prominent taste experience.

== Sources ==
=== Natural occurrence ===
Glutamate is ubiquitous in biological life. It is found naturally in all living cells, primarily in the bound form as a constituent of proteins. Only a fraction of the glutamate in foods is in its "free" form, and only free glutamate produces an umami flavor in foods. The savory flavor of tomatoes, fermented soy products, yeast extracts, certain sharp cheeses, and fermented or hydrolyzed protein products (such as soy sauce and fermented bean paste) is partially due to the presence of free glutamate ions.

==== Asia ====
Japanese cuisine originally used broth made from kombu (kelp) to produce the umami taste in soups.

==== Rome ====
In the Roman Empire, glutamic acid was present in a sauce called garum, made from fermenting fish in saltwater. The flavor-enhancing properties of glutamic acid allowed Romans to reduce the use of expensive salt.

=== Concentration in foods ===
The following table illustrates the glutamate content of some selected common foods. Free glutamate is the form directly tasted and absorbed whereas glutamate bound in protein is not available until further breakdown by digestion or cooking. In general, vegetables contain more free glutamate but less protein-bound glutamate.

Food	Free glutamate (mg/100 g)	Protein glutamate (mg/100 g)
Monosodium glutamate	87720	
Makombu (kelp)	3190	
Rausu kombu (kelp)	2286	
Rishiri kombu (kelp)	1985	
Marmite	1960	
Hidaka kombu (kelp)	1344	
Nori (seaweed)	1378	
Vegemite	1431	
Japanese fish sauce	1383	
Roquefort cheese	1280	
Parmesan cheese	1200	9847
Korean soy sauce	1264	
Chinese soy sauce	926	
Japanese soy sauce	782	
Oyster sauce	900	
Green tea	668	
Cured ham	337	
Sardine	280	
Grape juice	258	
Clam	208	
Peas	200	5583
Scallop	159	
Squid	146	
Tomatoes	140	238
Oyster	137	
Corn	130	1765
Mussel	105	
Potatoes	102	
Duck	69	3636
Chicken	44	3309
Beef	33	2846
Pork	23	2325
Eggs	23	1583
Human milk	22	229
Salmon	20	2216
Cow milk	2	819

=== Hydrolyzed protein ===
Hydrolyzed proteins, or protein hydrolysates, are acid- or enzymatically treated proteins from certain foods. One example is yeast extract. Hydrolyzed protein contains free amino acids, such as glutamate, at levels of 5% to 20%. Hydrolyzed protein is used in the same manner as monosodium glutamate in many foods, such as canned vegetables, soups, and processed meats.

=== Pure salts ===
Manufacturers, such as Ajinomoto, use selected strains of Corynebacterium glutamicum bacteria in a nutrient-rich medium. The bacteria are selected for their ability to excrete glutamic acid, which is then separated from the nutrient medium and processed into its sodium salt, monosodium glutamate.

== Risks of oversupply ==
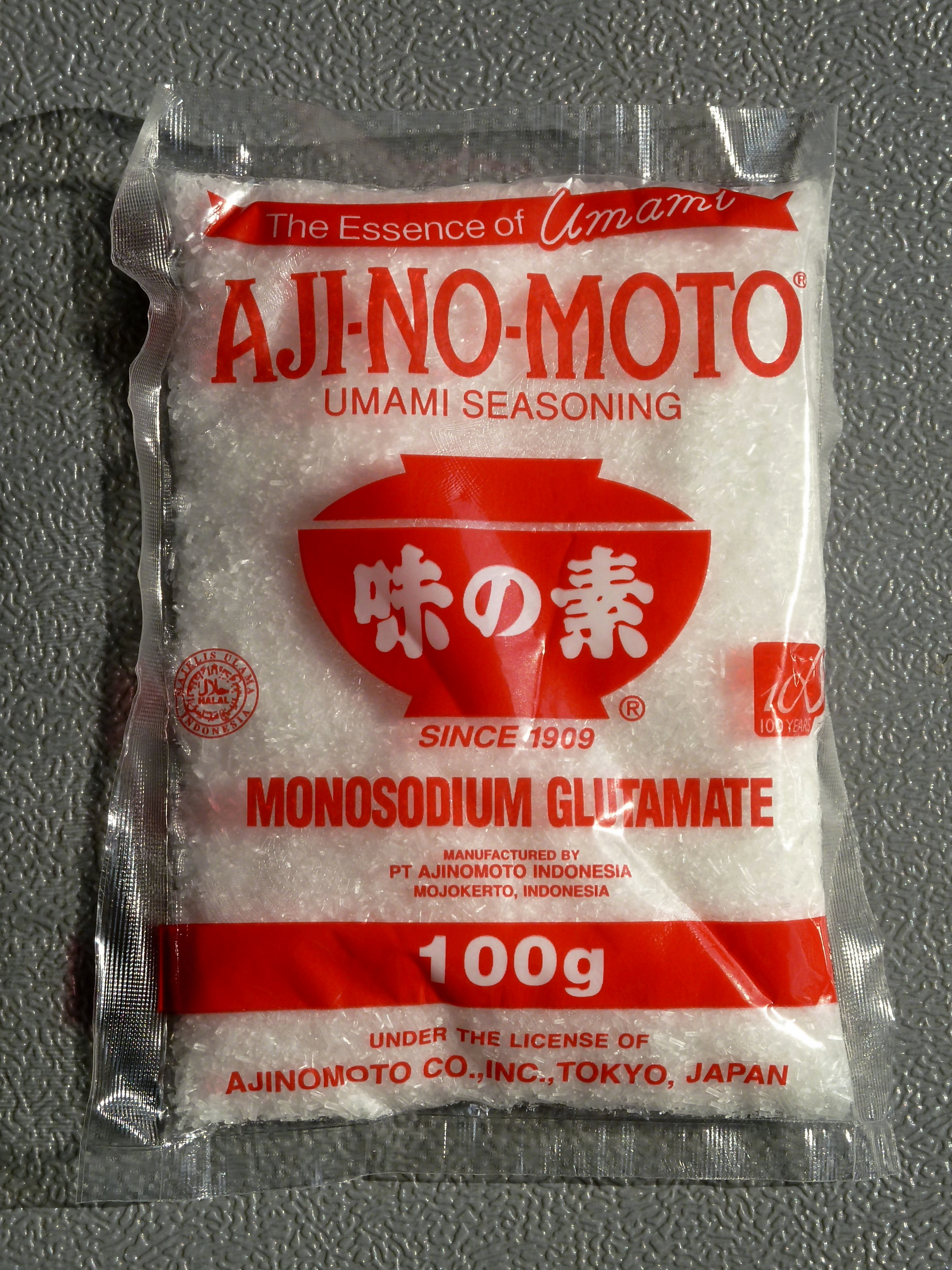
Monosodium glutamate sold as an umami flavor enhancer

=== Medical studies ===
Glutamate is the most important excitatory neurotransmitter in the central nervous system of vertebrates. Several complex mechanisms in the brain provide a protection against a possible oversupply of glutamate there, because this can cause neurotoxicity even leading to the death of nerve cells.

There are certain groups of persons, however, where these protection mechanisms in the brain against a glutamate oversupply are damaged. This was observed, for example, in cases of post-traumatic stress disorder (PTSD) or depression. Accordingly, it was shown in preclinical trials that the decrease of glutamate in the brain by administration of pyruvate led to a decline of anxiety and depression.

The additional consumption of glutamate, for example monosodium glutamate (MSG), as a flavor enhancer was associated with an increased probability to develop a metabolic syndrome in a large sample of a rural population in Thailand.

=== Social perceptions ===
==== Origin ====
The controversy surrounding the safety of MSG started with the publication of Robert Ho Man Kwok's correspondence letter titled "Chinese-Restaurant Syndrome" in the New England Journal of Medicine on 4 April 1968. In his letter, Kwok suggested several possible causes for symptoms that he experienced before he nominated MSG. This letter was initially met with insider satirical responses, often using race as prop for humorous effect, within the medical community. During the discursive uptake in media, the conversations were recontextualized as legitimate while the race-based motivations of the humor were not parsed, which replicated historical racial prejudices.

Despite the resulting public backlash, the Food and Drug Administration (FDA) did not remove MSG from their Generally Recognized as Safe list. In 1970, a National Research Council under the National Academy of Sciences, on behalf of the FDA, investigated MSG but concluded that MSG was safe for consumption.

==== Reactions ====
The controversy about MSG is tied to racial stereotypes against East Asian societies. Herein, specifically East Asian cuisine was targeted, whereas the widespread usage of MSG in Western processed food does not generate the same stigma. These kind of perceptions, such as the rhetoric of the so-called Chinese restaurant syndrome, have been attributed to xenophobic or racist biases.

Food historian Ian Mosby wrote that fear of MSG in Chinese food is part of the United States' long history of viewing the "exotic" cuisine of Asia as dangerous and dirty. In 2016, Anthony Bourdain stated in Parts Unknown that "I think [MSG] is good stuff. I don't react to it – nobody does. It's a lie... You know what causes Chinese restaurant syndrome? Racism."

In 2020, Ajinomoto, the leading manufacturer of MSG, and others launched the #RedefineCRS campaign, in reference to the term "Chinese restaurant syndrome", to combat the misconceptions about MSG, saying they intended to highlight the xenophobic prejudice against East Asian cuisine and the scientific evidence. Following the campaign, Merriam-Webster announced it would review the term.

== Regulations ==
=== Regulation timeline ===
In 1959, the U.S. Food and Drug Administration (FDA) classified monosodium glutamate as generally recognized as safe (GRAS). This action stemmed from the 1958 Food Additives Amendment to the Federal Food, Drug, and Cosmetic Act that required premarket approval for new food additives and led the FDA to promulgate regulations listing substances, such as monosodium glutamate, which have a history of safe use or are otherwise GRAS.

Since 1970, FDA has sponsored extensive reviews on the safety of monosodium glutamate, other glutamates, and hydrolyzed proteins, as part of an ongoing review of safety data on GRAS substances used in processed foods. One such review was by the Federation of American Societies for Experimental Biology (FASEB) Select Committee on GRAS Substances. In 1980, the committee concluded that monosodium glutamate was safe at current levels of use but recommended additional evaluation to determine monosodium glutamate's safety at significantly higher levels of consumption. Additional reports attempted to look at this.

In 1986, FDA's Advisory Committee on Hypersensitivity to Food Constituents concluded that monosodium glutamate poses no threat to the general public but that reactions of brief duration might occur in some people. Other reports have given the following findings:

- The 1987 Joint Expert Committee on Food Additives of the United Nations Food and Agriculture Organization and the World Health Organization placed monosodium glutamate in the safest category of food ingredients.
- A 1991 report by the European Community's (EC) Scientific Committee for Foods reaffirmed monosodium glutamate's safety and classified its "acceptable daily intake" as "not specified", the most favorable designation for a food ingredient. In addition, the EC Committee said, "Infants, including prematures, have been shown to metabolize glutamate as efficiently as adults and therefore do not display any special susceptibility to elevated oral intakes of glutamate." Legislation in effect since June 2013 classifies glutamic acid and glutamates as salt substitutes, seasonings, and condiments with a maximum level of consumption of 10g/kg expressed as glutamic acid.

=== European Union ===
Following the compulsory EU-food labeling law the use of glutamic acid and its salts has to be declared, and the name or E number of the salt has to be listed. Glutamic acid and its salts as food additives have the following E numbers: glutamic acid: E620, monosodium glutamate: E621, monopotassium glutamate: E622, calcium diglutamate: E623, monoammonium glutamate: E624, and magnesium diglutamate: E625. In the European Union, these substances are regarded as "flavor enhancers" and are not allowed to be added to milk, emulsified fat and oil, pasta, cocoa/chocolate products and fruit juice. The EU has not yet published an official NOAEL (no observable adverse effect level) for glutamate, but a 2006 consensus statement of a group of German experts drawing from animal studies was that a daily intake of glutamic acid of 6 grams per kilogram of body weight (6 g/kg/day) is safe. From human studies, the experts noted that doses as high as 147g/day produced no adverse effects in males when given for 30 days; in a 70 kg (150 lb) male, this amount corresponds to 2.1 g per kg of body weight.

=== United States ===
In 1959, the Food and Drug Administration classified MSG as a "generally recognized as safe" (GRAS) food ingredient under the Federal Food, Drug, and Cosmetic Act. In 1986, FDA's Advisory Committee on Hypersensitivity to Food Constituents also found that MSG was generally safe, but that short-term reactions may occur in some people. To further investigate this matter, in 1992 the FDA contracted the Federation of American Societies for Experimental Biology (FASEB) to produce a detailed report, which was published in 1995. The FASEB report reaffirmed the safety of MSG when it is consumed at usual levels by the general population, and found no evidence of any connection between MSG and any serious long-term reactions.

Under 2003 U.S. Food and Drug Administration regulations, when monosodium glutamate is added to a food, it must be identified as "monosodium glutamate" in the label's ingredient list. Because glutamate is commonly found in food, primarily from protein sources, the FDA does not require foods and ingredients that contain glutamate as an inherent component to list it on the label. Examples include tomatoes, cheeses, meats, hydrolyzed protein products such as soy sauce, and autolyzed yeast extracts. These ingredients are to be declared on the label by their common or usual names. The term 'natural flavor' is now used by the food industry when using glutamic acid. Because of lack of regulation, it is impossible to determine what percentage of 'natural flavor' is actually glutamic acid.

The food additives disodium inosinate and disodium guanylate are usually used in synergy with monosodium glutamate-containing ingredients, and provide a likely indicator of the addition of glutamate to a product.

As of 2002, the National Academy of Sciences Committee on Dietary Reference Intakes had not set a NOAEL or LOAEL for glutamate.

=== Australia and New Zealand ===
Standard 1.2.4 of the Australia New Zealand Food Standards Code requires the presence of monosodium glutamate as a food additive to be labeled. The label must bear the food additive class name (such as "flavor enhancer"), followed by either the name of the food additive (such as "MSG") or its International Numbering System (INS) number (e.g., "621").

=== Canada ===
The Canada Food Inspection Agency considers claims of "no MSG" or "MSG free" to be misleading and deceptive when other sources of free glutamates are present.

== Ingredients ==
Forms of glutamic acid that can be added to food include:

- Monosodium glutamate
- Glutamic acid (E620), glutamate (E620)
- Monopotassium glutamate (E622)
- Calcium glutamate (E623)
- Monoammonium glutamate (E624)
- Magnesium glutamate (E625)
- Sodium glutamate (E621)

The following are also rich sources of glutamic acid, and may be added for umami flavor:

- Hydrolyzed vegetable protein
- Autolyzed yeast, yeast extract, yeast food, and nutritional yeast
- Cheese products, e.g. parmesan (1200 mg / 100 g)
- Various savory fermented seasonings, including soy sauce and worcestershire sauce
- (See § Sources for more examples.)

== See also ==
- Adenosine monophosphate
- Disodium glutamate
- Guanosine monophosphate
- Inosinic acid
- List of food additives
- Tien Chu Ve-Tsin
