= CDG =

CDG may refer to:

== People ==
- Charles de Gaulle (CdG; 1890–1970), French general and President

== Places ==
- Charles de Gaulle Airport (CdG; IATA code CDG), Paris, France
- Chandigarh railway station (station code CDG), Chandigarh. Punjab and Haryana, India
- CDG Express, a rail line between Gare de l'Est train station and Charles de Gaulle airport, in Paris, France

== Groups, organizations ==
- Shandong Airlines (ICAO code CDG), based in Shandong, China
- CDG Books, a subsidiary of Wiley and parent of Macmillan of Canada
- CDG Group (from: Control Data Group), formerly Thai subsidiary of Control Data, a group of tech companies in Thailand
- CDMA Development Group, the industrial association for CDMA telecommunications
- Caisse de dépôt et de gestion, Moroccan pension fund
- Gulf Cartel (CDG; Spanish: Cartel del Golfo), a criminal syndicate and drug trafficking organization in Mexico
- Casual Dining Group, a hospitality company of restaurant chains
- Cave Diving Group, a UK-based diver training organization focused on cave diving
- ComfortDelGro, a Singaporean multinational land transport company
- Comédie de Genève, a Swiss theatre
- Comme des Garçons, a Japanese fashion company
- Costume Designers Guild, an international professional labor union
- Council for a Democratic Germany, a US-based WW2 German exile organization for the reformation of Germany

== Specifications, protocols, standards ==
- CD+G or CD+Graphics, a format of Compact Disc including both audio and video graphics
- CAIA Delay-Gradient, in computer networking, a congestion control algorithm
- Carriage of Dangerous Goods, associated with ADR (treaty)

== Other uses ==
- Calcium diglutamate (CDG; Ca(C_{5}H_{8}NO_{4})_{2}), a calsium salt of glutamic acid
- Card-driven game, a type of wargaming
- Chamari language (ISO 639 language code cdg), language of the Chamar caste in India
- French aircraft carrier Charles de Gaulle (R91) (CdG), a nuclear-powered aircraft carrier of France
- Congenital disorder of glycosylation, an inborn error of metabolism, also known as CDG Syndrome
