= Glutamate dehydrogenase (NADP+) =

Identifiers
- EC no.: 1.4.1.4
- CAS no.: 2604121

Databases
- BRENDA: enzyme data
- ExPASy: NiceZyme view
- KEGG: enzyme entry
- MetaCyc: metabolic pathway
- Rhea: reactions
- PDB structures: RCSB PDB PDBe PDBsum
Search
- PMC: articles
- PubMed: articles
- NCBI: proteins

Glutamate dehydrogenase (NADP+) (EC 1.4.1.4, glutamic dehydrogenase, dehydrogenase, glutamate (nicotinamide adenine dinucleotide (phosphate)), glutamic acid dehydrogenase, L-glutamate dehydrogenase, L-glutamic acid dehydrogenase, NAD(P)+-glutamate dehydrogenase, NAD(P)H-dependent glutamate dehydrogenase, glutamate dehydrogenase (NADP+)) is an enzyme with systematic name L-glutamate:NADP+ oxidoreductase (deaminating). This enzyme is a type of glutamate dehydrogenase that is distinguished from other types by only using NADP+/NADPH as a cofactor, and is found in certain fungi like yeast and bacteria like E. coli. It catalyses the following chemical reaction

L-glutamate + H_{2}O + NADP+ $\rightleftharpoons$ 2-oxoglutarate + NH_{3} + NADPH + H^{+}
