= C5H12N2O4 =

The molecular formula C_{5}H_{12}N_{2}O_{4} (molar mass: 164.161 g/mol) may refer to:

- Monoammonium glutamate
- Ammonium itaconate
