= Disodium guanylate =

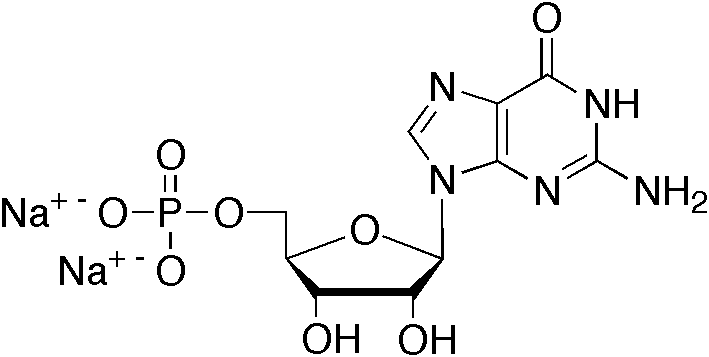

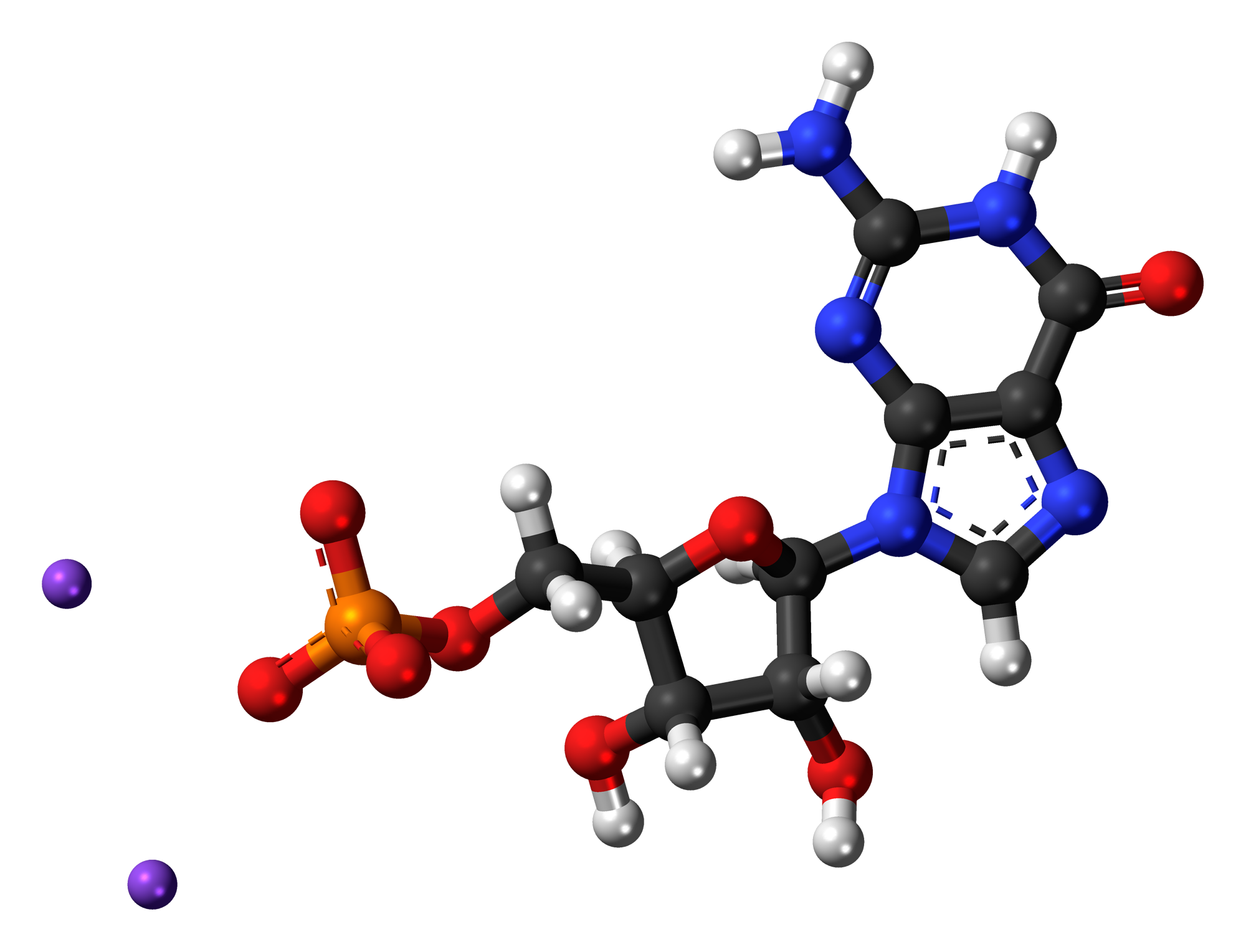

Names
- IUPAC name Disodium 5′-guanylate
- Systematic IUPAC name Disodium [(2R,3S,4R,5R)-5-(2-amino-4-oxo-2,3-dihydro-9H-purin-9-yl)-3,4-dihydroxyoxolan-2-yl]methyl phosphate
- Other names: Sodium 5'-guanylate

Identifiers
CAS Number	5550-12-9
3D model (JSmol)	Interactive image
ChEBI	CHEBI:132932
ChemSpider	20407
ECHA InfoCard	100.024.468
EC Number	226-914-1
E number	E627 (flavour enhancer)
PubChem CID	21712
UNII	B768T44Q8V
CompTox Dashboard (EPA)	DTXSID9044245
- InChI: InChI=1S/C10H14N5O8P.2Na/c11-10-13-7-4(8(18)14-10)12-2-15(7)9-6(17)5(16)3(23-9)1-22-24(19,20)21;;/h2-3,5-6,9,16-17H,1H2,(H2,19,20,21)(H3,11,13,14,18);;/q;2*+1/p-2/t3-,5-,6-,9-;;/m1../s1 Key: PVBRXXAAPNGWGE-LGVAUZIVSA-L
- SMILES: C1=NC2=C(N1C3C(C(C(O3)COP(=O)([O-])[O-])O)O)NC(=NC2=O)N.[Na+].[Na+]

Properties
Chemical formula	C_{10}H_{12}N_{5}Na_{2}O_{8}P
Molar mass	407.186 g·mol^{−1}
- Except where otherwise noted, data are given for materials in their standard state (at 25 °C [77 °F], 100 kPa). verify (what is ?) Infobox references

Disodium guanylate, also known as sodium 5'-guanylate and disodium 5'-guanylate, is a natural sodium salt of the flavor enhancing nucleotide guanosine monophosphate (GMP). Disodium guanylate is a food additive with the E number E627. It is a common flavor enhancer often used in combination with monosodium glutamate (MSG) and disodium inosinate in processed foods.

As it is a fairly expensive additive, it is usually not used independently of glutamic acid; if disodium guanylate is present in a list of ingredients but MSG does not appear to be, it is likely that glutamic acid is provided as part of another ingredient such as a processed soy protein complex. It is often added to foods in conjunction with disodium inosinate; the combination is known as disodium 5'-ribonucleotides.

Owing to the sufficient availability and stable quality of raw materials, large-scale production of disodium guanylate is currently predominantly realized via bio-fermentation processes of Corynebacterium stationis and Escherichia coli. Major disodium guanylate manufacturers include Ajinomoto, CJ CheilJedang, as well as some Chinese enterprises like Sinofi. It is often added to instant noodles, potato chips and other snacks, savory rice, tinned vegetables, cured meats, and packaged soup.

== See also ==
- Acceptable daily intake
- Glutamate flavoring
- Kikunae Ikeda
- Umami
- Ajinomoto
- Tien Chu Ve-Tsin
- Glutamic acid
- Disodium glutamate
- Monopotassium glutamate
- Disodium inosinate
- Inosinic acid
- Guanosine monophosphate
- Adenosine monophosphate
- Hypoxanthine-guanine phosphoribosyltransferase
- Ribonucleoside
