= Disodium inosinate =

Names
- IUPAC name Disodium 5′-inosinate
- Systematic IUPAC name Disodium [(2R,3S,4R,5R)-3,4-dihydroxy-5-(4-oxo-2,3-dihydro-9H-purin-9-yl)oxolan-2-yl]methyl phosphate
- Other names: Sodium 5′-inosinate; Disodium inosin 5′-monophosphate; Inosine 5′-(disodium phosphate); Sodium inosinate

Identifiers
| CAS Number | 4691-65-0 |
| 3D model (JSmol) | Interactive image; Interactive image |
| ChemSpider | 19594 |
| ECHA InfoCard | 100.022.860 |
| E number | E631 (flavour enhancer) |
| PubChem CID | 20819 |
| UNII | T2ZYA7KC05 |
| CompTox Dashboard (EPA) | DTXSID4044242 |
- InChI: InChI=1S/C10H13N4O8P.2Na/c15-6-4(1-21-23(18,19)20)22-10(7(6)16)14-3-13-5-8(14)11-2-12-9(5)17;;/h2-4,6-7,10,15-16H,1H2,(H,11,12,17)(H2,18,19,20);;/q;2*+1/p-2/t4-,6-,7-,10-;;/m1../s1 Key: AANLCWYVVNBGEE-IDIVVRGQSA-L; InChI=1/C10H13N4O8P.2Na/c15-6-4(1-21-23(18,19)20)22-10(7(6)16)14-3-13-5-8(14)11-2-12-9(5)17;;/h2-4,6-7,10,15-16H,1H2,(H,11,12,17)(H2,18,19,20);;/q;2*+1/p-2/t4-,6-,7-,10-;;/m1../s1 Key: AANLCWYVVNBGEE-IMCBXCBXBI
- SMILES: C1=NC(=O)C2=C(N1)N(C=N2)C3C(C(C(O3)COP(=O)([O-])[O-])O)O.[Na+].[Na+]; [Na+].[Na+].[O-]P([O-])(=O)OC[C@H]3O[C@@H](n1cnc2c1N\C=N/C2=O)[C@H](O)[C@@H]3O

Properties
| Chemical formula | C_{10}H_{11}N_{4}Na_{2}O_{8}P |
| Molar mass | 392.171 g·mol^{−1} |
- Except where otherwise noted, data are given for materials in their standard state (at 25 °C [77 °F], 100 kPa). verify (what is ?) Infobox references

Disodium inosinate (E631) is the disodium salt of inosinic acid with the chemical formula C_{10}H_{11}N_{4}Na_{2}O_{8}P. It is used as a food additive and often found in instant noodles, potato chips, and a variety of other snacks.

Commercial disodium inosinate may either be obtained from bacterial fermentation of sugars or prepared from animal products. The Vegetarian Society reports that production from meat or fish is more widespread, but the Vegetarian Resource Group reports that all three "leading manufacturers" say that they use fermentation.

== Use as a food additive ==
Disodium inosinate is used as a flavor enhancer, in synergy with monosodium glutamate (MSG) to provide the umami taste. It is often added to foods in conjunction with disodium guanylate; the combination is known as disodium 5′-ribonucleotides.

As a relatively expensive product, disodium inosinate is usually not used independently of glutamic acid; if disodium inosinate is present in a list of ingredients, but MSG does not appear to be, it is possible that glutamic acid is provided as part of another ingredient or is naturally occurring in another ingredient like tomatoes, Parmesan cheese, or yeast extract.

== Origin ==
Inosinate is naturally found in meat and fish at levels of 80–800 mg/100 g. It can also be made by fermentation of sugars such as tapioca starch.

Some sources say that industrial levels of production are achieved by extraction from animal products, making E631 non-vegetarian. However, owing to the sufficient availability and stable quality of raw materials, large-scale production of disodium inosinate is currently predominantly realized via bio-fermentation processes of Corynebacterium Stationis. Major disodium inosinate manufacturers include Ajinomoto, CJ CheilJedang, as well as some Chinese companies such as Sinofi. An interview by the Vegetarian Resource Group reports that all three "leading manufacturers" (one being Ajinomoto) say that they use an all-vegetarian fermentation process. Producers are generally open to providing information on the origin. E631 is in some cases labeled as "vegetarian" in ingredients lists when produced from plant sources.

== Toxicology and safety ==
In the United States, consumption of added 5′-ribonucleotides averages 4 mg per day, compared to 2 g per day of naturally occurring purines. A review of literature by an FDA committee found no evidence of carcinogenicity, teratogenicity, or adverse effects on reproduction.

In 2004, disodium inosinate was proposed to be removed from the food additive list by Codex Alimentarius Commission. This change did not go through: it is still present in the 2009 Codex Alimentarius list.

== See also ==
- Acceptable daily intake
- Disodium guanylate
- Guanosine monophosphate
- Glutamate flavoring
- Kikunae Ikeda
- Umami
- Ajinomoto
- Tien Chu Ve-Tsin
- Glutamic acid
- Disodium glutamate
- Monopotassium glutamate
- Inosinic acid
- Adenosine monophosphate
- Hypoxanthine-guanine phosphoribosyltransferase
- Ribonucleoside
