= Calcium diglutamate =

Names
- IUPAC name Calcium bis[(2S)- 2-amino-4-carboxy-butyrate]
- Other names: Calcium biglutamate; L-Glutamic acid calcium salt

Identifiers
CAS Number	anhydrous: 5996-22-5; tetrahydrate: 69704-19-4
3D model (JSmol)	anhydrous: Interactive image
Abbreviations	CDG, CBG
Beilstein Reference	11158966
ChemSpider	anhydrous: 2766261
ECHA InfoCard	100.025.307
E number	E623 (flavour enhancer)
PubChem CID	anhydrous: 3527266; tetrahydrate: 71310219
UNII	anhydrous: 9FA5OTO85L; tetrahydrate: IPW75840KB
CompTox Dashboard (EPA)	anhydrous: DTXSID00894986
- InChI: anhydrous: InChI=1/2C5H9NO4.Ca.2H/c2*6-3(5(9)10)1-2-4(7)8;;;/h2*3H,1-2,6H2,(H,7,8)(H,9,10);;;/p-4/t2*3-;;;/m00.../s1/r2C5H9NO4.CaH2/c2*6-3(5(9)10)1-2-4(7)8;/h2*3H,1-2,6H2,(H,7,8)(H,9,10);1H2/p-4/t2*3-;/m00./s1 Key: ZKUDDWCZGPUNQH-VDEFSOALBX
- SMILES: anhydrous: C(CC(=O)[O-])C(C(=O)[O-])N.C(CC(=O)[O-])C(C(=O)[O-])N.[Ca+2]

Properties
Chemical formula	C_{10}H_{16}CaN_{2}O_{8}
Molar mass	332.322 g·mol^{−1}
- Except where otherwise noted, data are given for materials in their standard state (at 25 °C [77 °F], 100 kPa). Infobox references

Calcium diglutamate, sometimes abbreviated CDG and also called calcium biglutamate, is a compound with formula Ca(C_{5}H_{8}NO_{4})_{2}. It is a calcium acid salt of glutamic acid. CDG is a flavor enhancer (E number E623)—it is the calcium analog of monosodium glutamate (MSG). Because the glutamate is the actual flavor-enhancer, CDG has the same flavor-enhancing properties as MSG but without the increased sodium content. Notably, only the L isomer is used in flavouring as D-glutamate does not have an umami/savoury flavour.

As a soluble source of calcium ions, this chemical is also used as a first-aid treatment for exposure to hydrofluoric acid.

== Synthesis and reactions ==
Calcium di-glutamate can be prepared by reacting calcium carbonate with two molar equivalents of glutamic acid:

CaCO_{3} + 2 HOOC(CH_{2})_{2}CH(NH_{2})COOH → Ca(OOC(CH_{2})_{2}CH(NH_{3})COO)_{2} + H_{2}O + CO_{2}↑

Concentration of the solution to a syrup under reduced pressure, followed by gradual crystallisation, affords the monohydrate. Structurally, the glutamate anion is zwitterionic, with the amino group protonated (pK_{a} = 9.47) and both carboxylic-acid groups (pK_{a} = 2.10, 4.07) in their deprotonated carboxylate form.

Calcium di-L-glutamate can be used to prepare other glutamates through metathesis with a soluble sulfate, carbonate or hydroxide salt. For example, manganese(II) di-L-glutamate can be prepared through metathesis with manganese(II) sulphate:

Ca(OOC(CH_{2})_{2}CH(NH_{3})COO)_{2} + MnSO_{4} → Mn(OOC(CH_{2})_{2}CH(NH_{3})COO)_{2} + CaSO_{4}↓
