= Disodium ribonucleotides =

Flavor enhancer

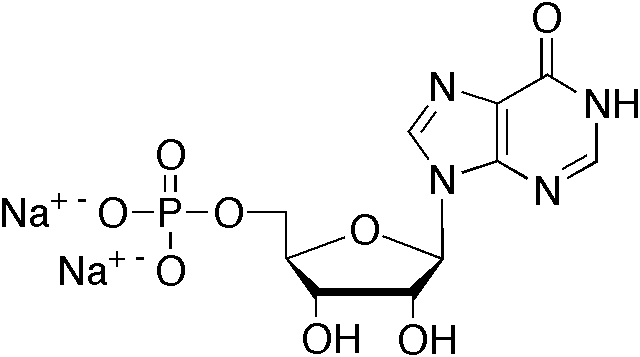
Disodium inosinate

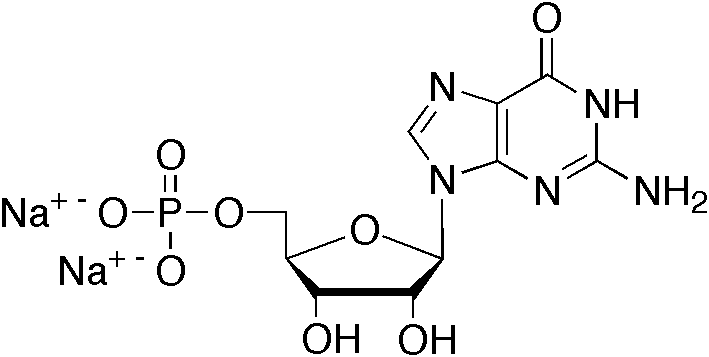
Disodium guanylate

Disodium 5'-ribonucleotides or I+G, E number E635, is a flavor enhancer which is synergistic with glutamates in creating the taste of umami. It is a mixture of disodium inosinate (IMP) and disodium guanylate (GMP) and is often used where a food already contains natural glutamates (as in meat extract) or added monosodium glutamate (MSG). It is primarily used in flavored noodles, snack foods, chips, crackers, sauces and fast foods. It is produced by combining the sodium salts of the natural compounds guanylic acid (E626) and inosinic acid (E630).

A mixture composed of 98% monosodium glutamate and 2% E635 has four times the flavor enhancing power of monosodium glutamate (MSG) alone. Due to the sufficient availability and stable quality of raw materials, bulk production of disodium ribonucleotides is currently predominantly carried out via bio-fermentation of Corynebacterium stationis and Escherichia coli. Major disodium ribonucleotide manufacturers include Ajinomoto, CJ CheilJedang, and some Chinese companies like Sinofi.

== Side effects and safety ==
Disodium 5'-ribonucleotides were first assessed in 1974 by the Joint FAO/WHO Expert Committee on Food Additives based on all available scientific literature. This assessment resulted in a new specification prepared and an "ADI Not Specified". This essentially means that this additive shows no toxicology at any level and acceptable daily limits do not need to be set. The definition is as follows:

This statement means that, on the basis of available data (chemical, biochemical, and toxicological), the total daily intake of the substance arising from its use or uses at levels necessary to achieve the desired effect and from its acceptable background in food, does not, in the opinion of the Committee, represent a hazard to health. For this reason, and for reasons stated in the individual evaluations, the establishment of an acceptable daily intake (ADI) expressed in mg per kg of body weight is not deemed necessary.

In 1993, the Joint FAO/WHO Expert Committee on Food Additives considered several more studies on this food additive and retained the "ADI not specified" safety classification.

== See also ==
- List of food additives
- Ribonucleotide
