= Magnesium diglutamate =

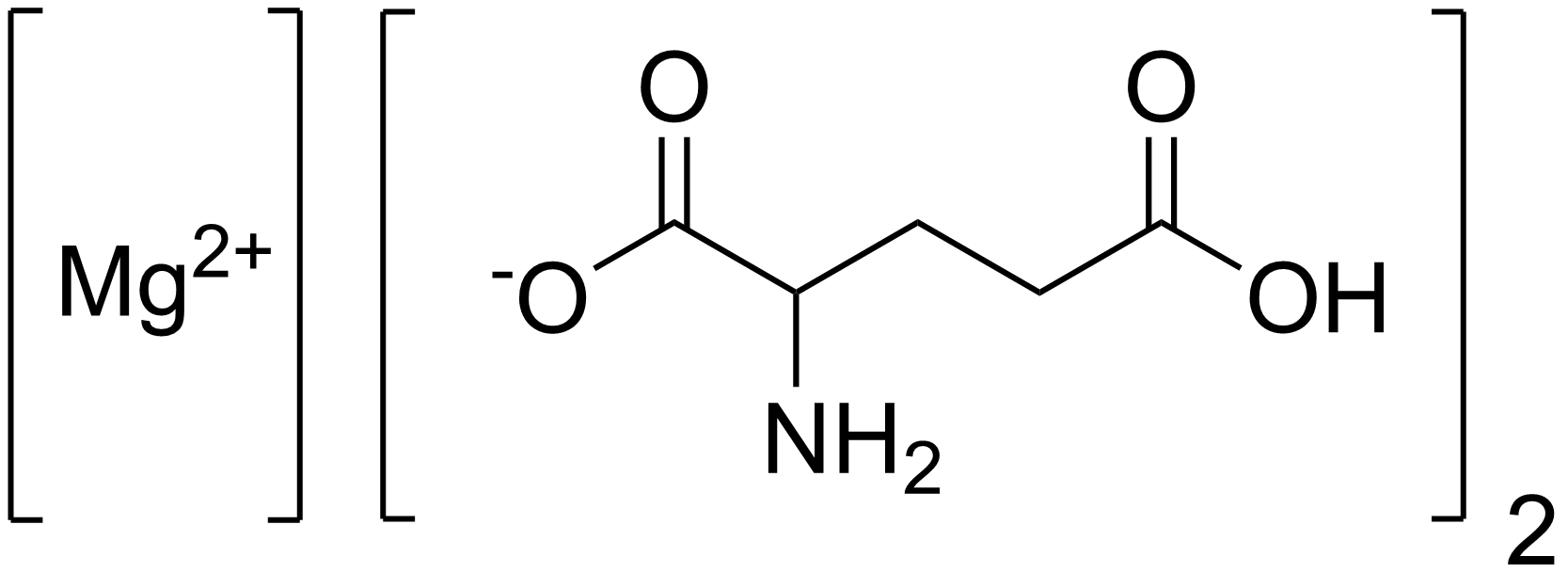

Names
- IUPAC name Magnesium diglutamate(1−)
- Systematic IUPAC name Magnesium bis(4-amino-4-carboxybutanoate)
- Other names: Magnesium glutamate; E625; Glutamic acid hemimagnesium salt

Identifiers
CAS Number	18543-68-5
3D model (JSmol)	Interactive image
ChemSpider	3306947
ECHA InfoCard	100.038.542
E number	E625 (flavour enhancer)
PubChem CID	4092622
UNII	U515Z7SI3O
- InChI: InChI=1S/2C5H9NO4.Mg/c2*6-3(5(9)10)1-2-4(7)8;/h2*3H,1-2,6H2,(H,7,8)(H,9,10);/q;;+2/p-2 Key: MYUGVHJLXONYNC-UHFFFAOYSA-L; InChI=1/2C5H9NO4.Mg/c2*6-3(5(9)10)1-2-4(7)8;/h2*3H,1-2,6H2,(H,7,8)(H,9,10);/q;;+2/p-2 Key: MYUGVHJLXONYNC-NUQVWONBAS
- SMILES: [Mg+2].O=C([O-])CCC(N)C(=O)O.[O-]C(=O)CCC(N)C(=O)O

Properties
Chemical formula	C_{10}H_{16}MgN_{2}O_{8}
Molar mass	316.549 g·mol^{−1}
Melting point	Tetrahydrate: 130 to 135 °C (266 to 275 °F; 403 to 408 K) (decomposes)
- Except where otherwise noted, data are given for materials in their standard state (at 25 °C [77 °F], 100 kPa). verify (what is ?) Infobox references

Magnesium diglutamate is a compound with formula Mg(C_{5}H_{8}NO_{4})_{2}. It is a magnesium acid salt of glutamic acid.

It has the E number E625 and is used in foods as a flavor enhancer. However, it is found to be a genotoxic compound, and has been found to increase the frequency of chromosomal aberrations at sufficiently high concentrations.
