= Glutamic acid (data page) =

Chemical data page

The complete data for Glutamic acid
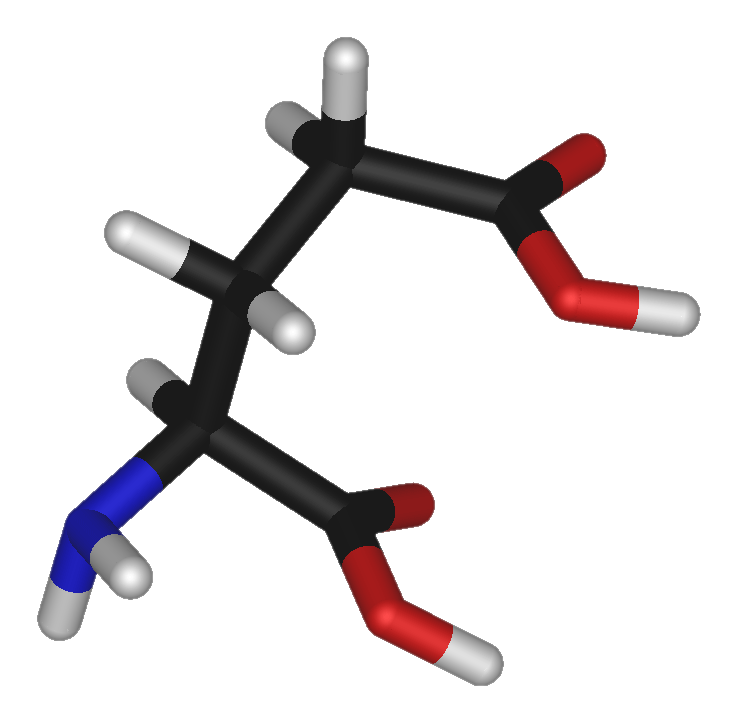
General information
Chemical formula: C_{5}H_{9}NO_{4}
Molar mass: 147.13 g·mol^{−1}
Systematic name:
(2S)-2-aminopentanedioic acid
Abbreviations: E, Glu
Synonyms:
2-amino-glutaric acid
Glutacid
Glutaminic acid
Database data
SMILES: OC(=O)CCC(N)C(=O)O
InChI=1/C5H9NO4/c6-3(5(9)10)1-2-4(7)8/h3H,1-2,6H2,(H,7,8)(H,9,10)/t3-/m0/s1/f/h7,9H - (L)

ATC: N/A	CAS: [56-86-0]	DrugBank: N/A	EINECS: 200-293-7	PubChem: 23327 (D) ^{a}, 33032 (L) ^{a}

Physical properties

Structure	Crystal data	Spectral data: UV-Vis / IR / NMR / MS: Masses of main fragments: GMD MS Spectrum

Phase behavior	Solid properties ρ_{solid}: 1.538 g.cm^{−3} T_{m}: 247-249 °C	Liquid properties	Gas properties

Hazard properties

MSDS N/A	Main hazards: N/A	NFPA 704	Flash point: N/A	RTECS number: N/A

Chemical properties

XLogP: -3.386	pI: 3.22	pK_{a}: 2.16, 4.15, 9.58	Tautomers: 0	Hydrogen bond: donor - 3; acceptor - 5

Pharmacological properties

This box:
- Except where noted otherwise, data relate to Standard temperature and pressure.
- Reliability of data general note.
