= Alkali salt =

Type of chemical compound

Alkali salts or base salts are salts that are the product of incomplete neutralization of a strong base and a weak acid.

Rather than being neutral (as some other salts), alkali salts are bases as their name suggests. What makes these compounds basic is that the conjugate base from the weak acid hydrolyzes to form a basic solution. In sodium carbonate, for example, the carbonate from the carbonic acid hydrolyzes to form a basic solution. The chloride from the hydrochloric acid in sodium chloride does not hydrolyze, though, so sodium chloride is not basic.

The difference between a basic salt and an alkali is that an alkali is the soluble hydroxide compound of an alkali metal or an alkaline earth metal. A basic salt is any salt that hydrolyzes to form a basic solution.

Another definition of a basic salt would be a salt that contains amounts of both hydroxide and other anions. White lead is an example. It is basic lead carbonate, or lead carbonate hydroxide.

These materials are known for their high levels of dissolution in polar solvents.

These salts are insoluble and are obtained through precipitation reactions.

== Examples ==
- Sodium carbonate
- Sodium acetate
- Potassium cyanide
- Sodium sulfide
- Sodium bicarbonate

== Alkaline salts ==
'Alkaline salts' are often the major component of alkaline dishwasher detergent powders.

These salts may include:

- alkali metasilicates
- alkali metal hydroxides
- Sodium carbonate
- Sodium Bicarbonate

Examples of other strongly alkaline salts, include:

- Sodium percarbonate
- Sodium persilicate (?)
- Potassium metabisulfite

== See also ==
- Alkali
- Acid salt
