= Monoammonium glutamate =

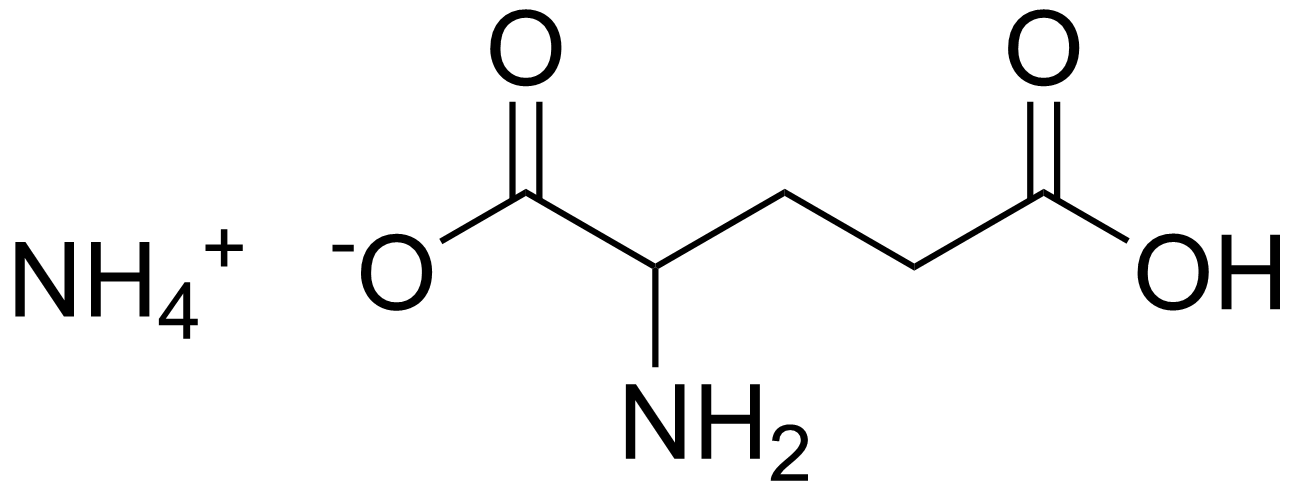

Names
- IUPAC name Azanium 4-amino-5-hydroxy-5-oxopentanoate
- Other names: Ammonium glutamate

Identifiers
CAS Number	15673-81-1
3D model (JSmol)	Interactive image
ChemSpider	22622
ECHA InfoCard	100.028.589
E number	E624 (flavour enhancer)
PubChem CID	24200
CompTox Dashboard (EPA)	DTXSID001350161 DTXSID3047714, DTXSID001350161
- InChI: InChI=1S/C5H9NO4.H3N/c6-3(5(9)10)1-2-4(7)8;/h3H,1-2,6H2,(H,7,8)(H,9,10);1H3 Key: PHKGGXPMPXXISP-UHFFFAOYSA-N; InChI=1/C5H9NO4.H3N/c6-3(5(9)10)1-2-4(7)8;/h3H,1-2,6H2,(H,7,8)(H,9,10);1H3 Key: PHKGGXPMPXXISP-UHFFFAOYAV
- SMILES: O=C([O-])CCC(N)C(=O)O.[NH4+]

Properties
Chemical formula	C_{5}H_{12}N_{2}O_{4}
Molar mass	164.161 g·mol^{−1}
- Except where otherwise noted, data are given for materials in their standard state (at 25 °C [77 °F], 100 kPa). verify (what is ?) Infobox references

Monoammonium glutamate is a compound with formula NH_{4}C_{5}H_{8}NO_{4}. It is an ammonium acid salt of glutamic acid.

It has the E number E624 and is used as a flavor enhancer.

== See also ==
- Monopotassium glutamate
- Monosodium glutamate
