= Auxigro =

Growth enhancer

Auxigro is a growth-enhancer that is approved in the United States by the United States Environmental Protection Agency for spray on fruits, vegetables, and grains. It is a mixture of equal parts gamma-aminobutyric acid (GABA), casein hydrolysate and glutamic acid dissolved in water.

Auxigro contains monosodium glutamate (MSG). It increases yield of potato if applied soon after emergence but not later, and has been shown to affect the growth and quality of beans, onions, and other crop plants.
