= CDG Group =

Group of Information technology companies in Thailand

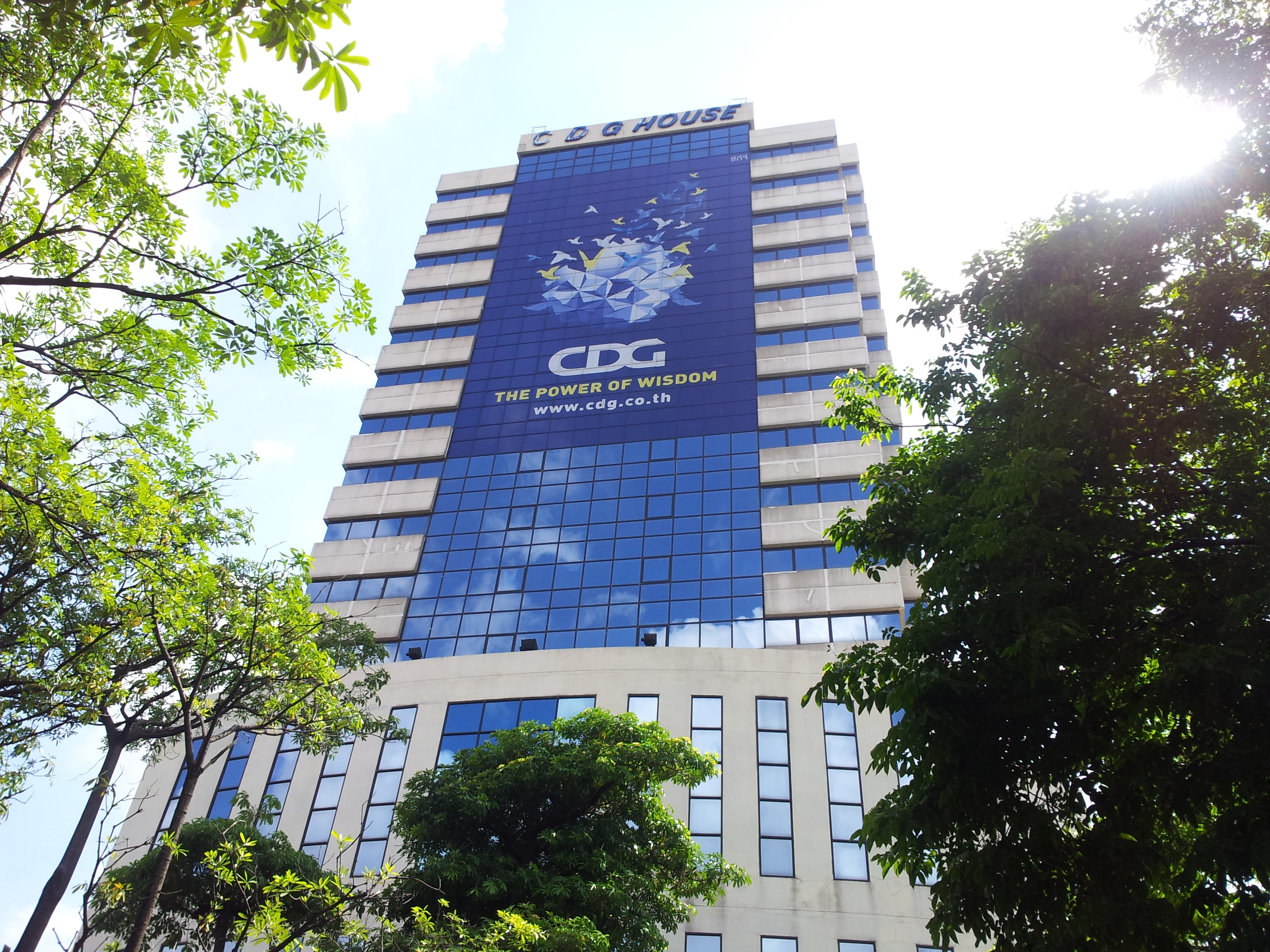
- CDG House Building
- Company type: Public
- Industry: Computer hardware and software IT services and consulting
- Founded: 1968 (Yingyong Lieuchareon)
- Headquarters: Bangkok, Thailand
- Key people: Nart Liuchareon (CEO)
- Website: www.cdg.co.th

The CDG Group is group of Information technology companies in Thailand. Their first affiliate, Control Data (Thailand) Ltd., was initially a subsidiary of Control Data (US), which had been established during the Vietnam War to serve the US army as the data backup center in Thailand. After the war, Yingyong Liuchareon acquired the business and registered it as a local Thai company in 1968.

CDG Group consists of five affiliates: Control Data (Thailand) Ltd., CDGS System Ltd., Computer Peripherals & Supplies Ltd., ESRI (Thailand) Co., Ltd., GlobeTech Co. Ltd., employing over 1,000 employees and handling 8 key fields.
