= GLUD2 =

Protein-coding gene in humans

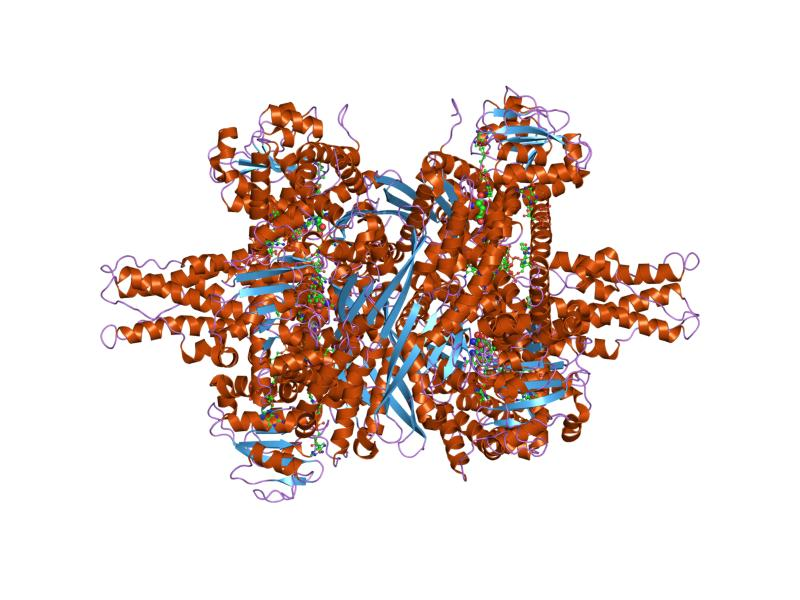

Identifiers
- Aliases: GLUD2, GDH2, GLUDP1, glutamate dehydrogenase 2
- External IDs: OMIM: 300144; GeneCards: GLUD2
Enzyme activity
EC #	BRENDA	ExPASy	KEGG	MetaCyc
1.4.1.3	↗	↗	↗	↗

Gene location (Human)
Chr.	X chromosome (human)
Band	Xq24	Start	121,047,610 bp
Band	Xq24	End	121,050,094 bp
RNA expression pattern
Bgee	Human / Mouse (ortholog); Top expressed in: right testis; left testis; testicle; placenta; right adrenal gland; right adrenal cortex; liver; right lobe of liver; human kidney; left adrenal gland / n/a; More reference expression data
BioGPS	n/a
Gene ontology
Molecular function	ADP binding; oxidoreductase activity; GTP binding; leucine binding; glutamate dehydrogenase [NAD(P)+ activity]; glutamate dehydrogenase (NAD+) activity; oxidoreductase activity, acting on the CH-NH2 group of donors, NAD or NADP as acceptor
Cellular component	cytoplasm; mitochondrion
Biological process	cellular amino acid metabolic process; glutamate metabolic process; glutamate catabolic process; glutamate biosynthetic process
Sources:Amigo / QuickGO
Orthologs
Databases	NCBI: entry; OMA: entry
Species	Human	Mouse
Entrez	2747	n/a
Ensembl	ENSG00000182890; ENSG00000288118	n/a
UniProt	P49448	n/a
RefSeq (mRNA)	NM_012084	n/a
RefSeq (protein)	NP_036216	n/a
Location (UCSC)	Chr X: 121.05 – 121.05 Mb	n/a
PubMed search		n/a
- Wikidata
View/Edit Human

Glutamate dehydrogenase 2, mitochondrial, also known as GDH 2, is an enzyme that in humans is encoded by the GLUD2 gene. This dehydrogenase is one of the family of glutamate dehydrogenases that are ubiquitous in life.

== Function ==
Glutamate dehydrogenase 2 is localized to the mitochondrion and acts as a homohexamer to recycle glutamate during neurotransmission. The encoded enzyme catalyzes the reversible oxidative deamination of glutamate to alpha-ketoglutarate.
