= Ammonium itaconate =

Names
- IUPAC name diazanium;2-methylidenebutanedioate

Identifiers
3D model (JSmol)	Interactive image
PubChem CID	17885752
- InChI: InChI=1S/C5H6O4.2H3N/c1-3(5(8)9)2-4(6)7;;/h1-2H2,(H,6,7)(H,8,9);2*1H3 Key: FRKMZLXCWXPBOB-UHFFFAOYSA-N
- SMILES: C=C(CC(=O)[O-])C(=O)[O-].[NH4+].[NH4+]

Properties
Chemical formula	C_{5}H_{12}N_{2}O_{4}
Molar mass	164.161 g·mol^{−1}
- Except where otherwise noted, data are given for materials in their standard state (at 25 °C [77 °F], 100 kPa). Infobox references

Ammonium itaconate is a chemical compound with the chemical formula C_{5}H_{12}N_{2}O_{4}.This is an organic ammonium salt of itaconic acid.

== Synthesis ==
The compound is synthesized through neutralization reactions between itaconic acid and ammonia or ammonium hydroxide.

== Uses ==
Itaconic acid derivatives, including ammonium salts, serve as precursors for polymers, adhesives, and biofuels. For example, itaconate-based polymers are used to produce superabsorbents and synthetic rubbers.
