= Delay-gradient congestion control =

In computer networking, delay-gradient congestion control refers to a class of congestion control algorithms, which react to the differences in round-trip delay time (RTT), as opposed to classical congestion control methods, which react to packet loss or an RTT threshold being exceeded. Such algorithms include CAIA Delay-Gradient (CDG) and TIMELY.

== See also ==
- TCP congestion control
