= Monopotassium glutamate =

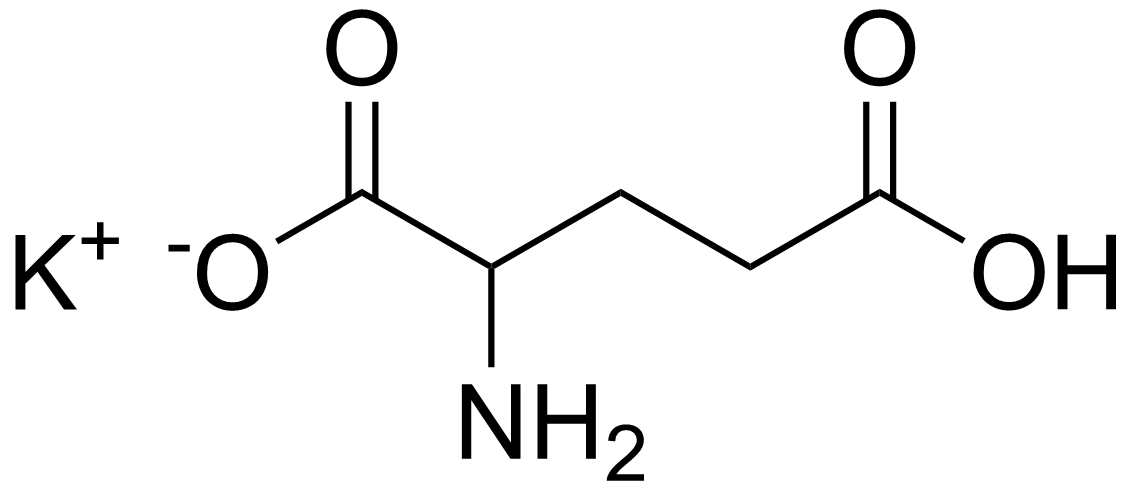

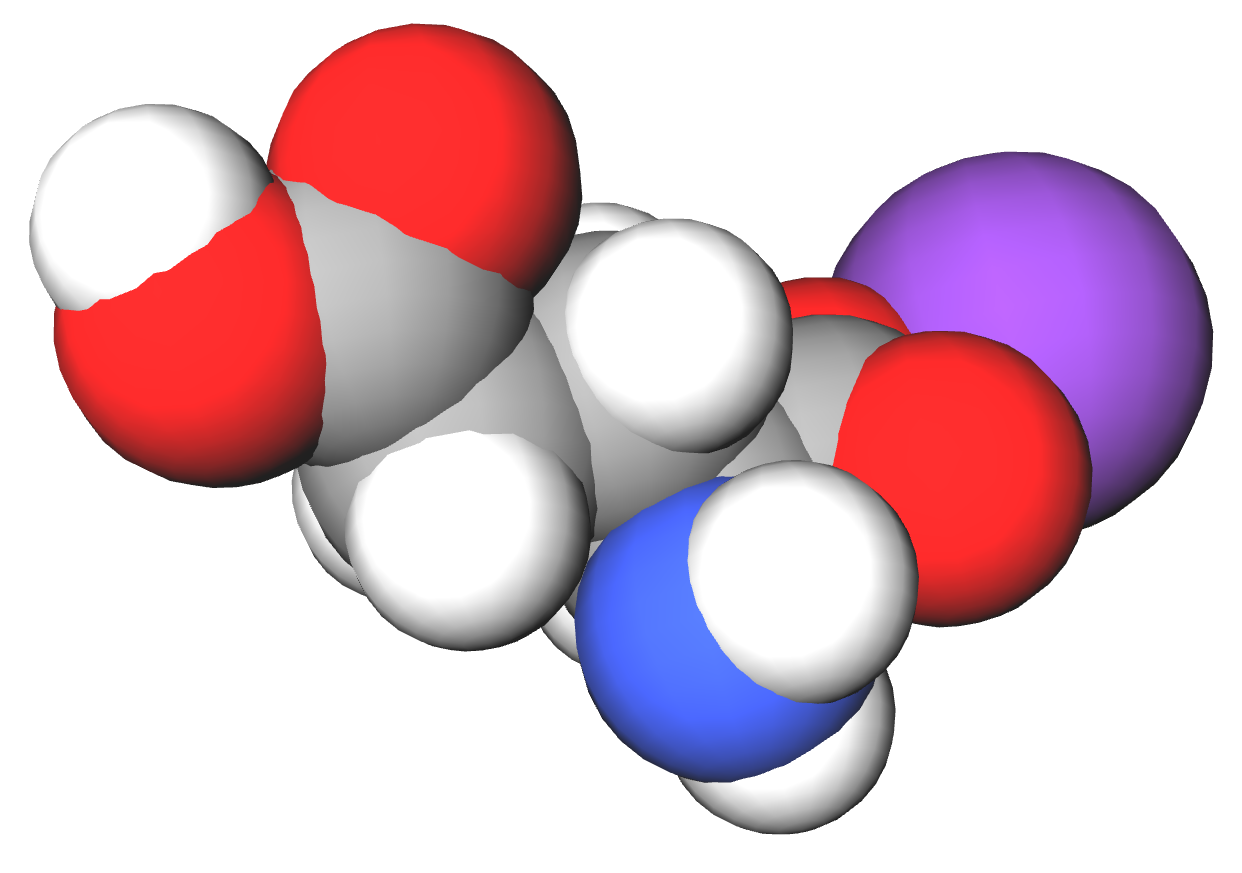

Names
- IUPAC name Potassium 2-amino-5-hydroxy-5-oxopentanoate
- Other names: Potassium glutamate; E622; Glutamic acid potassium salt

Identifiers
CAS Number	6382-01-0
3D model (JSmol)	Interactive image
ChemSpider	13228
ECHA InfoCard	100.039.161
E number	E622 (flavour enhancer)
PubChem CID	23669634
UNII	B5ZC7FHO6O
CompTox Dashboard (EPA)	DTXSID6044228
- InChI: InChI=1S/C5H9NO4.K/c6-3(5(9)10)1-2-4(7)8;/h3H,1-2,6H2,(H,7,8)(H,9,10);/q;+1/p-1 Key: HQEROMHPIOLGCB-UHFFFAOYSA-M; InChI=1/C5H9NO4.K/c6-3(5(9)10)1-2-4(7)8;/h3H,1-2,6H2,(H,7,8)(H,9,10);/q;+1/p-1 Key: HQEROMHPIOLGCB-REWHXWOFAL
- SMILES: [K+].O=C([O-])C(N)CCC(=O)O

Properties
Chemical formula	C_{5}H_{8}KNO_{4}
Molar mass	185.220 g·mol^{−1}
- Except where otherwise noted, data are given for materials in their standard state (at 25 °C [77 °F], 100 kPa). verify (what is ?) Infobox references

Monopotassium glutamate (MPG) is the compound with formula KC_{5}H_{8}NO_{4}. It is a potassium salt of glutamic acid.

It has the E number E622 and is used in foods as a flavor enhancer. It is a non-sodium MSG alternative. It is generally recognized as safe in the EU and in the USA.

== See also ==
- Monosodium glutamate
- Monoammonium glutamate
