= Glutamate dehydrogenase =

Hexameric enzyme

glutamate dehydrogenase (NAD+)

Identifiers
- EC no.: 1.4.1.2
- CAS no.: 9001-46-1

Databases
- BRENDA: enzyme data
- ExPASy: NiceZyme view
- KEGG: enzyme entry
- MetaCyc: metabolic pathway
- Rhea: reactions
- PDB structures: RCSB PDB PDBe PDBsum
- Gene Ontology: AmiGO / QuickGO
Search
- PMC: articles
- PubMed: articles
- NCBI: proteins

glutamate dehydrogenase [NAD(P)+]

Identifiers
- EC no.: 1.4.1.3
- CAS no.: 9029-12-3

Databases
- BRENDA: enzyme data
- ExPASy: NiceZyme view
- KEGG: enzyme entry
- MetaCyc: metabolic pathway
- Rhea: reactions
- PDB structures: RCSB PDB PDBe PDBsum
- Gene Ontology: AmiGO / QuickGO
Search
- PMC: articles
- PubMed: articles
- NCBI: proteins

glutamate dehydrogenase (NADP+)

Identifiers
- EC no.: 1.4.1.4
- CAS no.: 9029-11-2

Databases
- BRENDA: enzyme data
- ExPASy: NiceZyme view
- KEGG: enzyme entry
- MetaCyc: metabolic pathway
- Rhea: reactions
- PDB structures: RCSB PDB PDBe PDBsum
- Gene Ontology: AmiGO / QuickGO
Search
- PMC: articles
- PubMed: articles
- NCBI: proteins

Glutamate dehydrogenase (GLDH, GDH) is a type of enzyme observed in both prokaryotes and eukaryotic mitochondria. The aforementioned reaction also yields ammonia, which in eukaryotes is canonically processed as a substrate in the urea cycle. Typically, the α-ketoglutarate to glutamate reaction does not occur in mammals, as glutamate dehydrogenase equilibrium favours the production of ammonia and α-ketoglutarate. Glutamate dehydrogenase also has a very low affinity for ammonia (high Michaelis constant $K_m$ of about 1 mM), and therefore toxic levels of ammonia would have to be present in the body for the reverse reaction to proceed (that is, α-ketoglutarate and ammonia to glutamate and NAD(P)+). In the brain, the NAD+/NADH ratio in brain mitochondria encourages oxidative deamination (i.e. glutamate to α-ketoglutarate and ammonia). In bacteria, the ammonia is assimilated to amino acids via glutamate and aminotransferases. In plants, the enzyme can work in either direction depending on environment and stress. Transgenic plants expressing microbial GLDHs are improved in tolerance to herbicide, water deficit, and pathogen infections. They are more nutritionally valuable.

The enzyme represents a key link between catabolic and anabolic pathways, and is, therefore, ubiquitous in eukaryotes. In humans the relevant genes are called GLUD1 (glutamate dehydrogenase 1) and GLUD2 (glutamate dehydrogenase 2), and there are also at least five GLDH pseudogenes in the human genome as well.

== Function ==
The enzyme catalyses the reversible reaction:

L-Glutamic acid
+ NADP^{+}
H_{2}O
NH_{3}
H_{2}O
NH_{3}
α-Ketoglutaric acid
+ NADPH

== Clinical application ==
GLDH can be measured in a medical laboratory to evaluate the liver function. Elevated blood serum GLDH levels indicate liver damage and GLDH plays an important role in the differential diagnosis of liver disease, especially in combination with aminotransferases. GLDH is localised in mitochondria, therefore practically none is liberated in generalised inflammatory diseases of the liver such as viral hepatitides. Liver diseases in which necrosis of hepatocytes is the predominant event, such as toxic liver damage or hypoxic liver disease, are characterised by high serum GLDH levels. GLDH is important for distinguishing between acute viral hepatitis and acute toxic liver necrosis or acute hypoxic liver disease, particularly in the case of liver damage with very high aminotransferases. In clinical trials, GLDH can serve as a measurement for the safety of a drug.

Enzyme immunoassay (EIA) for glutamate dehydrogenase (GDH) can be used as screening tool for patients with Clostridioides difficile infection. The enzyme is expressed constitutively by most strains of C.diff, and can thus be easily detected in stool. Diagnosis is generally confirmed with a follow-up EIA for C. Diff toxins A and B.

== Cofactors ==
NAD^{+} (or NADP^{+}) is a cofactor for the glutamate dehydrogenase reaction, producing α-ketoglutarate and ammonium as a byproduct.

Based on which cofactor is used, glutamate dehydrogenase enzymes are divided into the following three classes:

- EC 1.4.1.2: L-glutamate + H_{2}O + NAD^{+} $\rightleftharpoons$ 2-oxoglutarate + NH_{3} + NADH + H^{+}
- EC 1.4.1.3: L-glutamate + H_{2}O + NAD(P)^{+} $\rightleftharpoons$ 2-oxoglutarate + NH_{3} + NAD(P)H + H^{+}
- EC 1.4.1.4: L-glutamate + H_{2}O + NADP^{+} $\rightleftharpoons$ 2-oxoglutarate + NH_{3} + NADPH + H^{+}

== Role in flow of nitrogen ==
Ammonia incorporation in animals and microbes occurs through the actions of glutamate dehydrogenase and glutamine synthetase. Glutamate plays the central role in mammalian and microbe nitrogen flow, serving as both a nitrogen donor and a nitrogen acceptor.

== Regulation of glutamate dehydrogenase ==
In humans, the activity of glutamate dehydrogenase is controlled through ADP-ribosylation, a covalent modification carried out by the gene sirt4. This regulation is relaxed in response to caloric restriction and low blood glucose. Under these circumstances, glutamate dehydrogenase activity is raised in order to increase the amount of α-ketoglutarate produced, which can be used to provide energy by being used in the citric acid cycle to ultimately produce ATP.

In microbes, the activity is controlled by the concentration of ammonium and or the like-sized rubidium ion, which binds to an allosteric site on GLDH and changes the K_{m} (Michaelis constant) of the enzyme.

The control of GLDH through ADP-ribosylation is particularly important in insulin-producing β cells. Beta cells secrete insulin in response to an increase in the ATP:ADP ratio, and, as amino acids are broken down by GLDH into α-ketoglutarate, this ratio rises and more insulin is secreted. SIRT4 is necessary to regulate the metabolism of amino acids as a method of controlling insulin secretion and regulating blood glucose levels.

Bovine liver glutamate dehydrogenase was found to be regulated by nucleotides in the late 1950s and early 1960s by Carl Frieden. In addition to describing the effects of nucleotides like ADP, ATP and GTP he described in detail the different kinetic behavior of NADH and NADPH. As such it was one of the earliest enzymes to show what was later described as allosteric behavior.

The activation of mammalian GDH by L-leucine and some other hydrophobic amino acids has also been long known, however localization of the binding site was not clear. Only recently the new allosteric binding site for L-leucine was identified in a mammalian enzyme.

Mutations which alter the allosteric binding site of GTP cause permanent activation of glutamate dehydrogenase, and lead to hyperinsulinism-hyperammonemia syndrome.

== Regulation ==
Allosteric regulation:

This protein may use the morpheein model of allosteric regulation.

Allosteric inhibitors:

- Guanosine triphosphate (GTP)
- Adenosine triphosphate (ATP)
- Palmitoyl-CoA
- Zn^{2+}

Activators:

- Adenosine diphosphate (ADP)
- Leucine
- l-isoleucine
- l-valine
- Guanosine diphosphate

Other Inhibitors:

- EGCG

Additionally, Mice GLDH shows substrate inhibition by which GLDH activity decreases at high glutamate concentrations.

== Isozymes ==
Humans express the following glutamate dehydrogenase isozymes:

glutamate dehydrogenase 1

Identifiers
- Symbol: GLUD1
- Alt. symbols: GLUD
- NCBI gene: 2746
- HGNC: 4335
- OMIM: 138130
- RefSeq: NM_005271
- UniProt: P00367

Other data
- EC number: 1.4.1.3
- Locus: Chr. 10 q21.1-24.3
Search for
- Structures: Swiss-model
- Domains: InterPro

glutamate dehydrogenase 2

Identifiers
- Symbol: GLUD2
- Alt. symbols: GLUDP1
- NCBI gene: 2747
- HGNC: 4336
- OMIM: 300144
- RefSeq: NM_012084
- UniProt: P49448

Other data
- EC number: 1.4.1.3
- Locus: Chr. X q25
Search for
- Structures: Swiss-model
- Domains: InterPro

== See also ==
- Anaplerotic reactions
