= Acid salt =

Salts that produce acidic solutions

Acid salts are a class of salts that produce an acidic solution after being dissolved in a solvent. Its formation as a substance has a greater electrical conductivity than that of the pure solvent. An acidic solution formed by acid salt is made during partial neutralization of diprotic or polyprotic acids. A half-neutralization occurs due to the remaining of replaceable hydrogen atoms from the partial dissociation of weak acids that have not been reacted with hydroxide ions (OH^{−}) to create water molecules.

== Formation ==
Structure of ammonium chloride

Acid–base property of the resulting solution from a neutralization reaction depends on the remaining salt products. A salt containing reactive cations undergo hydrolysis by which they react with water molecules, causing deprotonation of the conjugate acids.

For example, the acid salt ammonium chloride is the main species formed upon the half neutralization of ammonia in aqueous solution of hydrogen chloride:

NH_{3}(aq) + HCl(aq) → [NH_{4}]^{+}Cl^{−}(aq)

== Examples of acid salts ==
Example of acid salts
Name	Sodium bisulfate	Monosodium phosphate
Structural formula		
Chemical formula	NaHSO_{4}	NaH_{2}PO_{4}
IUPAC name	Sodium hydrogen sulfate	Sodium dihydrogen phosphate
Other name	Sodium acid sulfate; Bisulfate of soda	Monobasic sodium phosphate; Sodium acid phosphate; Sodium biphosphate
Molecular weight	120.054 g/mol	119.976 g/mol
Formal charge	zero	zero
Odour	Odourless	Odourless
Appearance	White crystals or granules	White crystalline powder
Structure	triclinic (anhydrous); monoclinic (monohydrate)	Monoclinic crystals
Solubility	Soluble in water; Insoluble in ammonia	Soluble in water; Insoluble in ethanol or ether
Density	2.742 g/cm^{3} (anhydrous); 1.8 g/cm^{3} (monohydrate)	0.5–1.2 g/cm^{3}
Decomposition (through heating)		Emits toxic fumes of phosphoxides and sodium oxide
Uses	Bleaching agents; Plating agents and surface treating agents; Cleaning and Furnishing Care Products	Treat constipation; Clean the bowel before a colonoscopy; Bleaching agents

== Use in food ==
Acid salts are often used in foods as part of leavening agents. In this context, the acid salts are referred to as leavening acids. Common leavening acids include cream of tartar and monocalcium phosphate.

An acid salt can be mixed with certain base salts (such as sodium bicarbonate (baking soda)) to create baking powders which release carbon dioxide. Leavening agents can be slow-acting (e.g. sodium aluminum phosphate) which react when heated, or fast-acting (e.g., cream of tartar) which react immediately at low temperatures. Double-acting baking powders contain both slow- and fast-acting leavening agents and react at low and high temperatures to provide even rising throughout the baking process.

Disodium phosphate, Na_{2}HPO_{4}, is used in foods and monosodium phosphate, NaH_{2}PO_{4}, is used in animal feed, toothpaste and evaporated milk.

== Intensity of acid ==
An acid with higher K_{a} value dominates the chemical reaction. It serves as a better contributor of protons (H^{+}). A comparison between the K_{a} and K_{b} indicates the acid–base property of the resulting solution by which:

1. The solution is acidic if K_{a} > K_{b}. It contains a greater concentration of H^{+} ions than concentration of OH^{−} ions due to more extensive cation hydrolysis compared to that of anion hydrolysis.
2. The solution is alkaline if K_{a} < K_{b}. Anions hydrolyze more than cations, causing an exceeding concentration of OH^{−} ions.
3. The solution is expected to be neutral only when K_{a} = K_{b}.

Other possible factors that could vary pH level of a solution are the relevant equilibrium constants and the additional amounts of any base or acid.

For example, in ammonium chloride solution, NH^{+}_{4} is the main influence for acidic solution. It has greater K_{a} value compared to that of water molecules; K_{a} of NH^{+}_{4} is 5.6×10^{−10}, and K_{w} of H_{2}O is 1.0×10^{−14}. This ensures its deprotonation when reacting with water, and is responsible for the pH below 7 at room temperature. Cl^{−} will have no affinity for H^{+} nor tendency to hydrolyze, as its K_{b} value is very low (K_{b} of Cl^{−} is 7.7×10^{−21}).

Hydrolysis of ammonium at room temperature produces:

$$\ce{NH4+_{(aq)}\ + H2O_{(aq)} <=> NH3_{(aq)}\ + H3O+_{(aq)}}$$
$$K_\mathrm{a} = \frac{\mathrm{[NH_3][H_3O^+]}}{\mathrm{[NH_4^+]}} = \frac{K_\mathrm{w}}{K_\mathrm{b}}$$
$$K_\mathrm{a} = \frac{[1.0 \times 10^{-14}]}{[1.8 \times 10^{-5}]} = {5.6} \times 10^{-10}$$

== See also ==
- Base salt
- Salt (chemistry)
- Oxoacid
- Sodium bicarbonate
- Sodium bisulfate: an example of acid salt
- Disodium phosphate: an example of acid salt
- Monosodium phosphate: an example of acid salt
