= Glutamic acid =

Amino acid and neurotransmitter

- Glutamic acid in non-ionic form Skeletal formula of L-glutamic acid

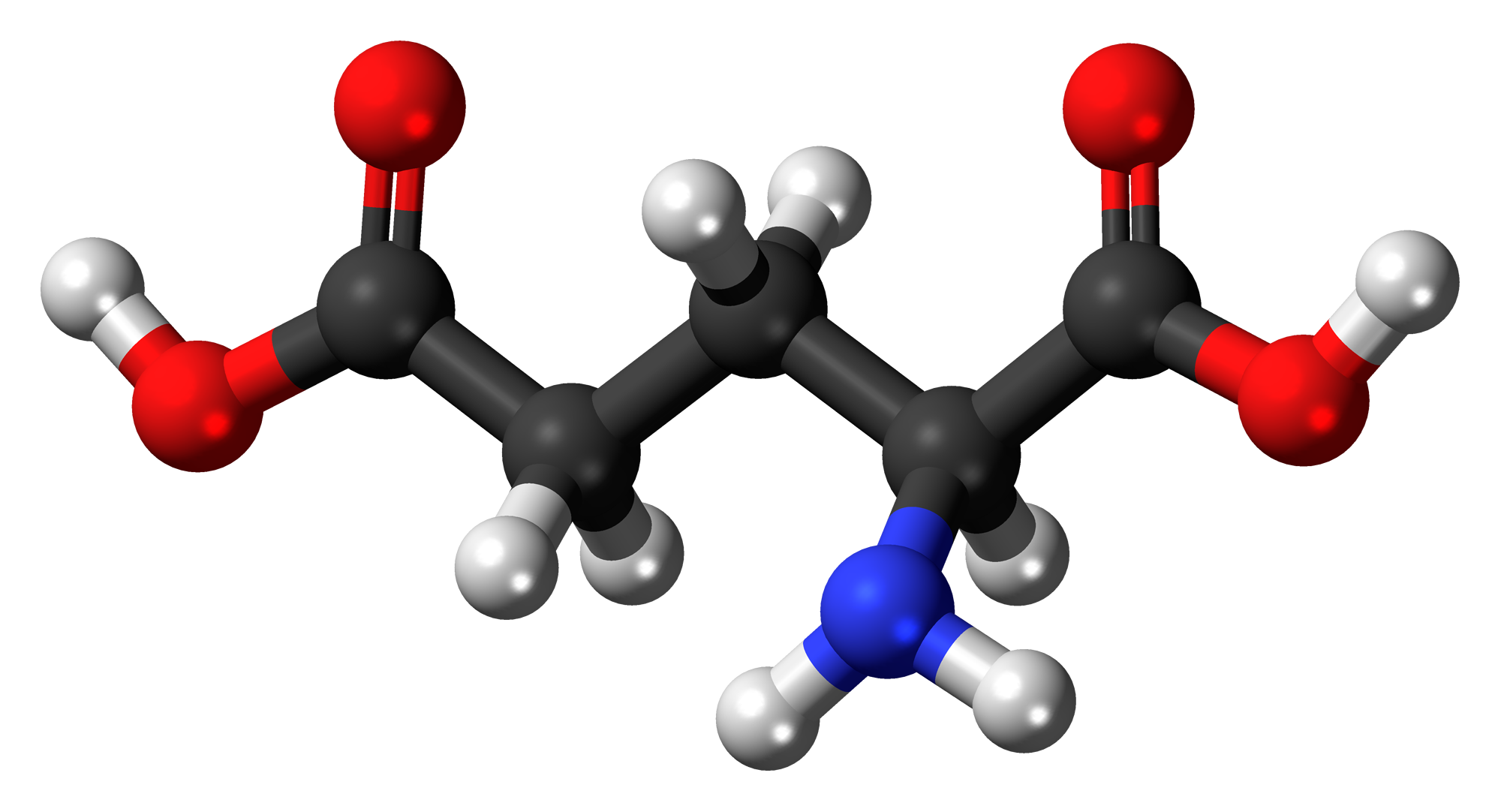
Ball-and-stick model
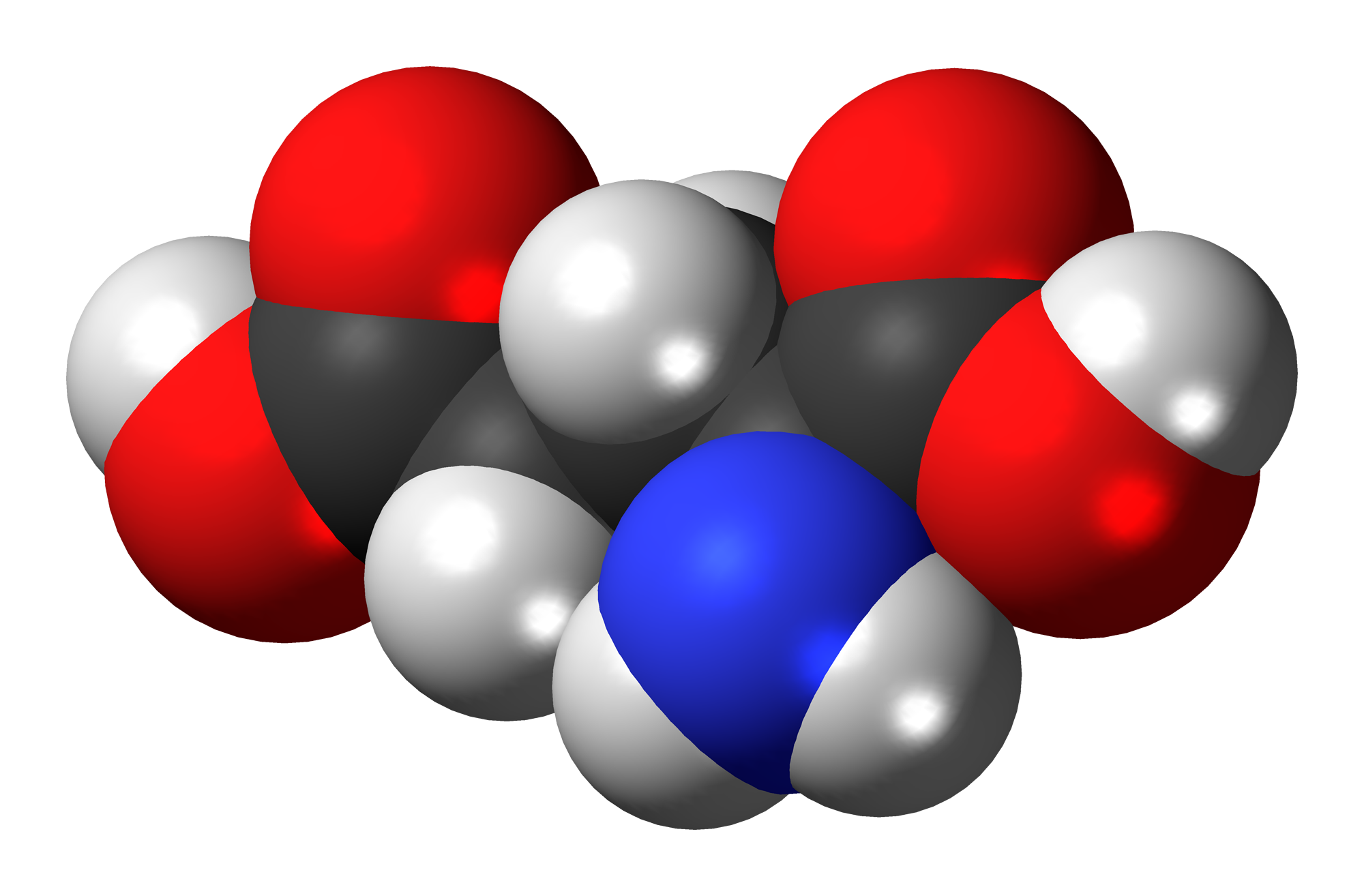
Space-filling model
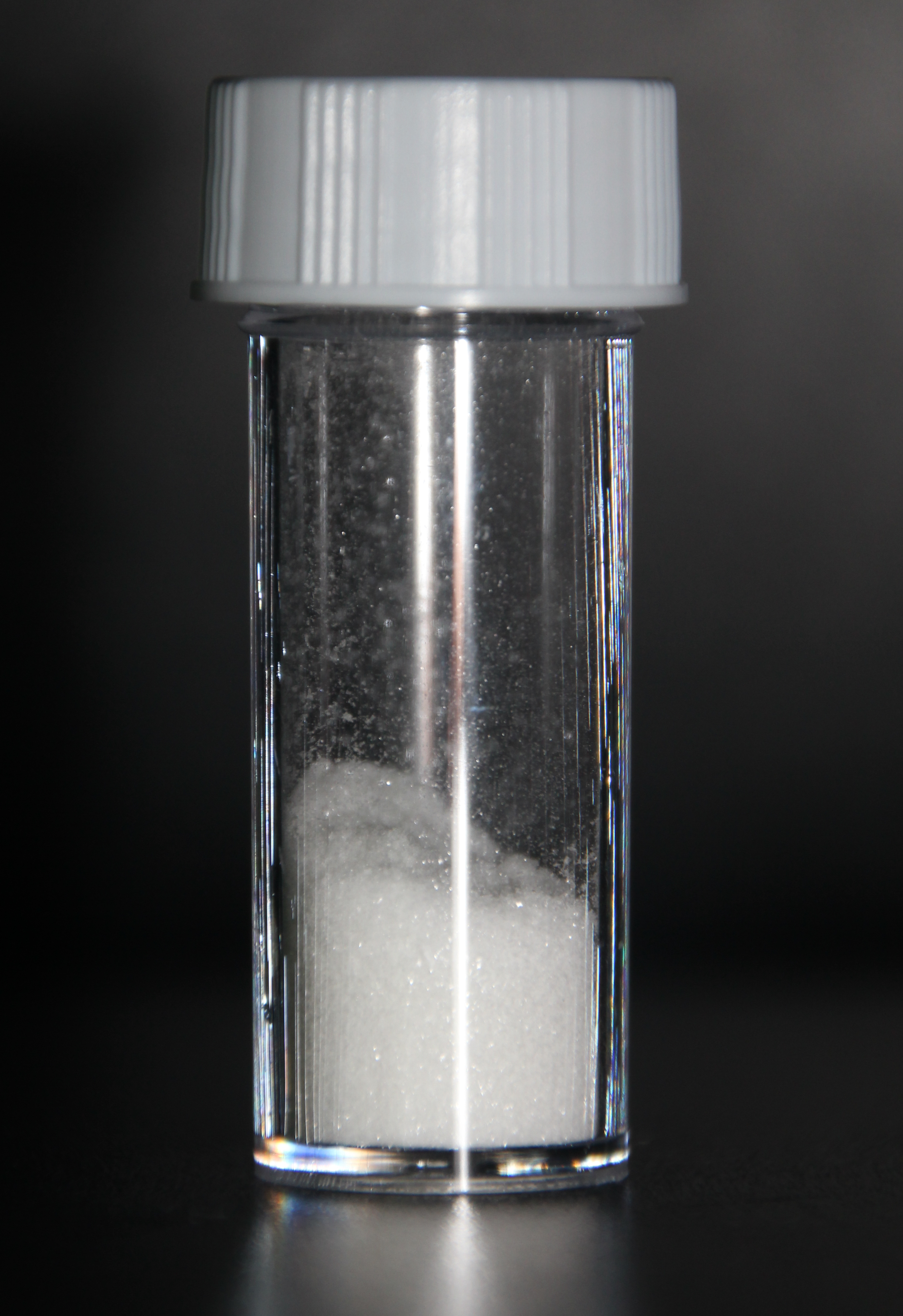

Names
- IUPAC name Glutamic acid
- Systematic IUPAC name 2-Aminopentanedioic acid
- Other names: 2-Aminoglutaric acid

Identifiers
CAS Number	l isomer: 56-86-0; racemate: 617-65-2; d isomer: 6893-26-1
3D model (JSmol)	l isomer: Interactive image; d isomer: Interactive image; Zwitterion: Interactive image; Deprotonated zwitterion: Interactive image
Beilstein Reference	1723801 (L) 1723799 (rac) 1723800 (D)
ChEBI	l isomer: CHEBI:16015; racemate: CHEBI:18237; d isomer: CHEBI:15966
ChEMBL	l isomer: ChEMBL575060
ChemSpider	l isomer: 30572
DrugBank	l isomer: DB00142; d isomer: DB02517
ECHA InfoCard	100.009.567
EC Number	l isomer: 200-293-7
E number	E620 (flavour enhancer)
Gmelin Reference	3502 (L) 101971 (rac) 201189 (D)
KEGG	l isomer: C00025; d isomer: C00217
PubChem CID	l isomer: 33032; d isomer: 23327
UNII	l isomer: 3KX376GY7L; racemate: 61LJO5I15S; d isomer: Q479989WEA
CompTox Dashboard (EPA)	l isomer: DTXSID0046987
- InChI: InChI=1S/C5H9NO4/c6-3(5(9)10)1-2-4(7)8/h3H,1-2,6H2,(H,7,8)(H,9,10) Key: WHUUTDBJXJRKMK-UHFFFAOYSA-N; l isomer: InChI=1/C5H9NO4/c6-3(5(9)10)1-2-4(7)8/h3H,1-2,6H2,(H,7,8)(H,9,10) Key: WHUUTDBJXJRKMK-UHFFFAOYAD
- SMILES: l isomer: C(CC(=O)O)[C@@H](C(=O)O)N; d isomer: C(CC(=O)O)[C@H](C(=O)O)N; Zwitterion: C(CC(=O)O)C(C(=O)[O-])[NH3+]; Deprotonated zwitterion: C(CC(=O)[O-])C(C(=O)[O-])[NH3+]

Properties
Chemical formula	C_{5}H_{9}NO_{4}
Molar mass	147.130 g·mol^{−1}
Appearance	White crystalline powder
Density	1.4601 (20 °C)
Melting point	199 °C (390 °F; 472 K) decomposes
Solubility in water	8.57 g/L (25 °C)
Solubility	Ethanol: 350 μg/100 g (25 °C)
Acidity (pK_{a})	2.10 (α-carboxyl; H_{2}O); 4.07 (side chain; H_{2}O); 9.47 (α-amino; H_{2}O)
Magnetic susceptibility (χ)	−78.5·10^{−6} cm^{3}/mol

Hazards
- GHS labelling
Pictograms	(GHS07: Exclamation mark)
Signal word	Warning
Hazard statements	H315, H319, H335
Precautionary statements	P261, P264, P271, P280, P302+P352, P304+P340, P305+P351+P338, P312, P321, P332+P313, P337+P313, P362, P403+P233, P405, P501
NFPA 704 (fire diamond)	2 1 0

Supplementary data page
- Glutamic acid (data page)
- Except where otherwise noted, data are given for materials in their standard state (at 25 °C [77 °F], 100 kPa). Infobox references

Glutamic acid ball and stick model spinning

Glutamic acid (symbol Glu or E; known as glutamate in its anionic form), molecular formula C_{5}H_{9}NO_{4}, is an α-amino acid that is used by almost all organisms for the biosynthesis of proteins. It is a conditionally essential amino acid, meaning that the body can generally synthesize it intrinsically, but under certain circumstances needs to procure it through food. It is also the most abundant excitatory neurotransmitter in the vertebrate nervous system. It serves as the precursor for the synthesis of the inhibitory gamma-aminobutyric acid (GABA) in GABAergic neurons.

Glutamic acid exists in two optically isomeric forms; the dextrorotary L-form is usually obtained by hydrolysis of gluten, from the waste waters of beet-sugar manufacturing, or by fermentation. Its molecular structure could be idealized as HOOC−CH(NH_{2})−(CH_{2})_{2}−COOH, with two carboxyl groups −COOH and one amino group −NH_{2}. However, in the solid state and mildly acidic water solutions, the molecule assumes an electrically neutral zwitterion structure ^{−}OOC−CH(NH^{+}_{3})−(CH_{2})_{2}−COOH. It is encoded by the codons GAA or GAG.

The acid can lose one proton from its second carboxyl group to form the conjugate base, the singly-negative anion glutamate ^{−}OOC−CH(NH^{+}_{3})−(CH_{2})_{2}−COO^{−}. This form of the compound is prevalent in neutral solutions. The glutamate neurotransmitter plays the principal role in neural activation. This anion creates the savory umami flavor of foods and is found in glutamate flavorings such as monosodium glutamate (MSG). In Europe, it is classified as food additive E621 [for monosodium glutamate] and E620 [for glutamic acid itself]. In highly alkaline solutions the doubly negative anion ^{−}OOC−CH(NH_{2})−(CH_{2})_{2}−COO^{−} prevails. The radical corresponding to glutamate is called glutamyl.

The one-letter symbol E for glutamate was assigned as the letter following D for aspartate, as glutamate is larger by one methylene –CH_{2}– group.

== Chemistry ==
=== Ionization ===
The glutamate monoanion

When glutamic acid is dissolved in water, the amino group (−NH_{2}) may gain a proton (H^{+}), and/or the carboxyl groups may lose protons, depending on the acidity of the medium.

In sufficiently acidic environments, both carboxyl groups are protonated and the molecule becomes a cation with a single positive charge, HOOC−CH(NH^{+}_{3})−(CH_{2})_{2}−COOH.

At pH values between about 2.5 and 4.1, the carboxylic acid closer to the amine generally loses a proton, and the acid becomes the neutral zwitterion ^{−}OOC−CH(NH^{+}_{3})−(CH_{2})_{2}−COOH. This is also the form of the compound in the crystalline solid state. The change in protonation state is gradual; the two forms are in equal concentrations at pH 2.10.

At even higher pH, the other carboxylic acid group loses its proton and the acid exists almost entirely as the glutamate anion ^{−}OOC−CH(NH^{+}_{3})−(CH_{2})_{2}−COO^{−}, with a single negative charge overall. The change in protonation state occurs at pH 4.07. This form with both carboxylates lacking protons is dominant in the physiological pH range (7.35–7.45).

At even higher pH, the amino group loses the extra proton, and the prevalent species is the doubly-negative anion ^{−}OOC−CH(NH_{2})−(CH_{2})_{2}−COO^{−}. The change in protonation state occurs at pH 9.47.

=== Optical isomerism ===
Glutamic acid is chiral; two mirror-image enantiomers exist: d(−), and l(+). The l form is more widely occurring in nature, but the d form occurs in some special contexts, such as the bacterial capsule and cell walls of bacteria (which produce it from the l form with the enzyme glutamate racemase) and can be found in small amounts in the liver and other organs of mammals, either directly from dietary sources or from production by the gut microbiota.

== History ==
Although they occur naturally in many foods, the flavor contributions made by glutamic acid and other amino acids were only scientifically identified early in the 20th century. The substance was discovered and identified in 1866 by the German chemist Karl Heinrich Ritthausen, who treated wheat gluten (for which it was named) with sulfuric acid. In 1908, Japanese researcher Kikunae Ikeda of the Tokyo Imperial University identified brown crystals left behind after the evaporation of a large amount of kombu broth as glutamic acid. These crystals, when tasted, reproduced the novel flavor he detected in many foods, most especially in seaweed. Professor Ikeda termed this flavor umami. He then patented a method of mass-producing a crystalline salt of glutamic acid, monosodium glutamate.

== Synthesis ==
=== Biosynthesis ===
Glutamate is primarily synthesized from α-ketoglutarate, an intermediate of the TCA cycle, through either transamination or reductive amination.

Biosynthetic reactions producing glutamate as a product
Reactants		Products	Enzymes
glutamine + H_{2}O	→	Glu + NH_{3}	GLS, GLS2
NAcGlu + H_{2}O	→	Glu + acetate	N-acetylglutamate synthase
α-ketoglutarate + NADPH + NH_{4}^{+}	→	Glu + NADP^{+} + H_{2}O	GLUD1, GLUD2
α-ketoglutarate + α-amino acid	→	Glu + α-keto acid	Transaminase
1-pyrroline-5-carboxylate + NAD^{+} + H_{2}O	→	Glu + NADH	ALDH4A1
N-formimino-L-glutamate + FH_{4}	→	Glu + 5-formimino-FH_{4}	FTCD
NAAG	→	Glu + NAA	GCPII

=== Industrial synthesis ===
Glutamic acid is produced on the largest scale of any amino acid, with an estimated annual production of about 1.5 million tons in 2006. Chemical synthesis was supplanted by the aerobic fermentation of sugars and ammonia in the 1950s, with the organism Corynebacterium glutamicum (also known as Brevibacterium flavum) being the most widely used for production. Isolation and purification can be achieved by concentration and crystallization; it is also widely available as its hydrochloride salt.

== Function and uses ==
=== Metabolism ===
Glutamate is a key compound in cellular metabolism. Dietary proteins are digested into amino acids, which can be absorbed into the bloodstream or serve as metabolic fuel within the intestinal lining cells (enterocytes). A key process in amino acid degradation is transamination, in which the amino group of an amino acid is transferred to an α-ketoacid, typically catalysed by a transaminase. The reaction can be generalised as such:

R_{1}-amino acid + R_{2}-α-ketoacid ⇌ R_{1}-α-ketoacid + R_{2}-amino acid

A very common α-keto acid is α-ketoglutarate, an intermediate in the citric acid cycle. Transamination of α-ketoglutarate gives glutamate. The resulting α-ketoacid product is often a useful one as well, which can contribute as fuel or as a substrate for further metabolic processes. Examples are as follows:

alanine + α-ketoglutarate ⇌ pyruvate + glutamate
aspartate + α-ketoglutarate ⇌ oxaloacetate + glutamate

Both pyruvate and oxaloacetate are key components of cellular metabolism, contributing as substrates or intermediates in fundamental processes such as glycolysis, gluconeogenesis, and the citric acid cycle.

Glutamate also plays an important role in the body's disposal of excess or waste nitrogen. Glutamate undergoes deamination, an oxidative reaction catalysed by glutamate dehydrogenase, as follows:

glutamate + H_{2}O + NADP^{+} → α-ketoglutarate + NADPH + NH_{3} + H^{+}

Ammonia (as ammonium) is then excreted predominantly as urea, synthesised in the liver. Transamination can thus be linked to deamination, effectively allowing nitrogen from the amine groups of amino acids to be removed, via glutamate as an intermediate, and finally excreted from the body in the form of urea.

Glutamate is also a neurotransmitter (see below), which makes it one of the most abundant molecules in the brain. Malignant brain tumors known as glioma or glioblastoma exploit this phenomenon by using glutamate as an energy source, especially when these tumors become more dependent on glutamate due to mutations in the gene IDH1.

== Neurotransmitter ==
Glutamate is the most abundant excitatory neurotransmitter in the vertebrate nervous system. At chemical synapses, glutamate is stored in vesicles. Nerve impulses trigger the release of glutamate from the presynaptic cell. Glutamate acts on ionotropic and metabotropic (G-protein coupled) receptors. In the opposing postsynaptic cell, glutamate receptors, such as the NMDA receptor or the AMPA receptor, bind glutamate and are activated. Because of its role in synaptic plasticity, glutamate is involved in cognitive functions such as learning and memory in the brain. The form of plasticity known as long-term potentiation takes place at glutamatergic synapses in the hippocampus, neocortex, and other parts of the brain. Glutamate works not only as a point-to-point transmitter, but also through spill-over synaptic crosstalk between synapses in which summation of glutamate released from a neighboring synapse creates extrasynaptic signaling/volume transmission. In addition, glutamate plays important roles in the regulation of growth cones and synaptogenesis during brain development as originally described by Mark Mattson.

=== Brain nonsynaptic glutamatergic signaling circuits ===
Extracellular glutamate in Drosophila brains has been found to regulate postsynaptic glutamate receptor clustering, via a process involving receptor desensitization. A gene expressed in glial cells actively transports glutamate into the extracellular space, while, in the nucleus accumbens-stimulating group II metabotropic glutamate receptors, this gene was found to reduce extracellular glutamate levels. This raises the possibility that this extracellular glutamate plays an "endocrine-like" role as part of a larger homeostatic system.

==== GABA precursor ====
Glutamate also serves as the precursor for the synthesis of the inhibitory gamma-aminobutyric acid (GABA) in GABA-ergic neurons. This reaction is catalyzed by glutamate decarboxylase (GAD). GABA-ergic neurons are identified (for research purposes) by revealing its activity (with the autoradiography and immunohistochemistry methods) which is most abundant in the cerebellum and pancreas.

Stiff person syndrome is a neurologic disorder caused by anti-GAD antibodies, leading to a decrease in GABA synthesis and, therefore, impaired motor function such as muscle stiffness and spasm. Since the pancreas has abundant GAD, a direct immunological destruction occurs in the pancreas and the patients will have diabetes mellitus.

=== Flavor enhancer ===
Glutamic acid, being a constituent of protein, is present in foods that contain protein, but it can only be tasted when it is present in an unbound form. Significant amounts of free glutamic acid are present in a wide variety of foods, including cheeses and soy sauce, and glutamic acid is responsible for umami, one of the five basic tastes of the human sense of taste. Glutamic acid often is used as a food additive and flavor enhancer in the form of its sodium salt, known as monosodium glutamate (MSG).

=== Nutrient ===
All meats, poultry, fish, eggs, dairy products, and kombu are excellent sources of glutamic acid. Some protein-rich plant foods also serve as sources. 30–35% of gluten (much of the protein in wheat) is glutamic acid. Ninety-five percent of the dietary glutamate is metabolized by intestinal cells in a first pass.

=== Plant growth ===
Auxigro is a plant growth preparation that contains 30% glutamic acid.

=== NMR spectroscopy ===
Poly-γ-benzyl-L-glutamate (PBLG), a glutamic acid derivative, is often used as an alignment medium to control the scale of the dipolar interactions observed in the use of residual dipolar coupling (RDC) in nuclear magnetic resonance spectroscopy (NMR).

=== Glutamate and aging ===
Brain glutamate levels tend to decline with age, and may be useful as a marker of age-related diseases of the brain.

== Pharmacology ==
The drug phencyclidine (more commonly known as PCP or 'Angel Dust') antagonizes glutamic acid non-competitively at the NMDA receptor. For the same reasons, dextromethorphan and ketamine also have strong dissociative and hallucinogenic effects. Acute infusion of the drug eglumetad (also known as eglumegad or LY354740), an agonist of the metabotropic glutamate receptors 2 and 3) resulted in a marked diminution of yohimbine-induced stress response in bonnet macaques (Macaca radiata); chronic oral administration of eglumetad in those animals led to markedly reduced baseline cortisol levels (approximately 50 percent) in comparison to untreated control subjects. Eglumetad has also been demonstrated to act on the metabotropic glutamate receptor 3 (GRM3) of human adrenocortical cells, downregulating aldosterone synthase, CYP11B1, and the production of adrenal steroids (i.e. aldosterone and cortisol). Glutamate does not easily pass the blood–brain barrier, but, instead, is transported by a high-affinity transport system. It can also be converted into glutamine.

Glutamate toxicity can be reduced by antioxidants, and the psychoactive principle of cannabis, tetrahydrocannabinol (THC), and the non-psychoactive principle cannabidiol (CBD), and other cannabinoids, is found to block glutamate neurotoxicity with a similar potency, and thereby potent antioxidants.

== See also ==
- Adenosine monophosphate
- Ajinomoto
- Disodium glutamate
- Disodium inosinate
- Glutamate flavoring
- Guanosine monophosphate
- Inosinic acid
- Kainic acid
- Monopotassium glutamate
- Monosodium glutamate
- Tien Chu Ve-Tsin
