= Nucleoside-triphosphate diphosphatase =

Class of enzymes

nucleoside-triphosphate diphosphatase

Identifiers
- EC no.: 3.6.1.19
- CAS no.: 9075-54-1

Databases
- IntEnz: IntEnz view
- BRENDA: BRENDA entry
- ExPASy: NiceZyme view
- KEGG: KEGG entry
- MetaCyc: metabolic pathway
- PRIAM: profile
- PDB structures: RCSB PDB PDBe PDBsum
- Gene Ontology: AmiGO / QuickGO
Search
- PMC: articles
- PubMed: articles
- NCBI: proteins

In enzymology, a nucleoside-triphosphate diphosphatase (EC 3.6.1.19) is an enzyme that catalyzes the chemical reaction

a nucleoside triphosphate + H_{2}O $\rightleftharpoons$ a nucleotide + diphosphate

Thus, the two substrates of this enzyme are nucleoside triphosphate and H_{2}O, whereas its two products are nucleotide and diphosphate.

This enzyme belongs to the family of hydrolases, specifically those acting on acid anhydrides in phosphorus-containing anhydrides. The systematic name of this enzyme class is nucleoside-triphosphate diphosphohydrolase. This enzyme is also called nucleoside-triphosphate pyrophosphatase. This enzyme participates in purine metabolism and pyrimidine metabolism.

For example, enzyme deoxyribonucleoside triphosphate pyrophosphatase, encoded by YJR069C in S. cerevisiae and exhibiting (d)ITPase and (d)XTPase activities, hydrolyses ITP, dITP, XTP and dXTP releasing pyrophosphate and IMP, dIMP, XMP and dXMP, respectively.

== Structural studies ==
As of late 2007, 5 structures have been solved for this class of enzymes, with PDB accession codes 1V7R, 2CAR, 2E5X, 2I5D, and 2J4E.
