= N-methyl nucleosidase =

Identifiers
- EC no.: 3.2.2.25

Databases
- IntEnz: IntEnz view
- BRENDA: BRENDA entry
- ExPASy: NiceZyme view
- KEGG: KEGG entry
- MetaCyc: metabolic pathway
- PRIAM: profile
- PDB structures: RCSB PDB PDBe PDBsum
Search
- PMC: articles
- PubMed: articles
- NCBI: proteins

N-methyl nucleosidase (EC 3.2.2.25) is an enzyme that catalyzes the chemical reaction

7-methylxanthosine
+ H_{2}O
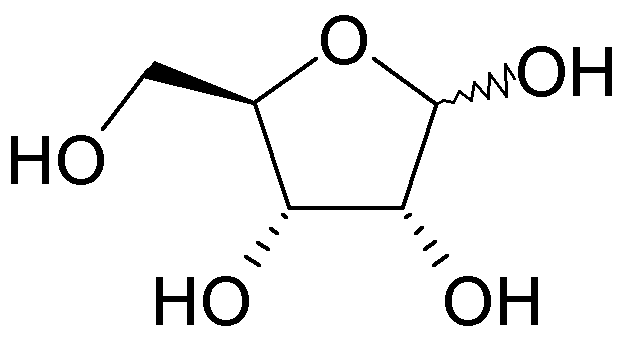
D-ribofuranose
+
7-methylxanthine

This hydrolysis reaction is the second step in the biosynthesis of caffeine from the nucleoside, xanthosine. 7-Methylxanthine is subsequently methylated by the enzyme theobromine synthase.

This enzyme belongs to the family of hydrolases, specifically those glycosylases that hydrolyse N-glycosyl compounds. The systematic name of this enzyme class is 7-methylxanthosine ribohydrolase. Other names in common use include 7-methylxanthosine nucleosidase, N-MeNase, N-methyl nucleoside hydrolase, and methylpurine nucleosidase.
