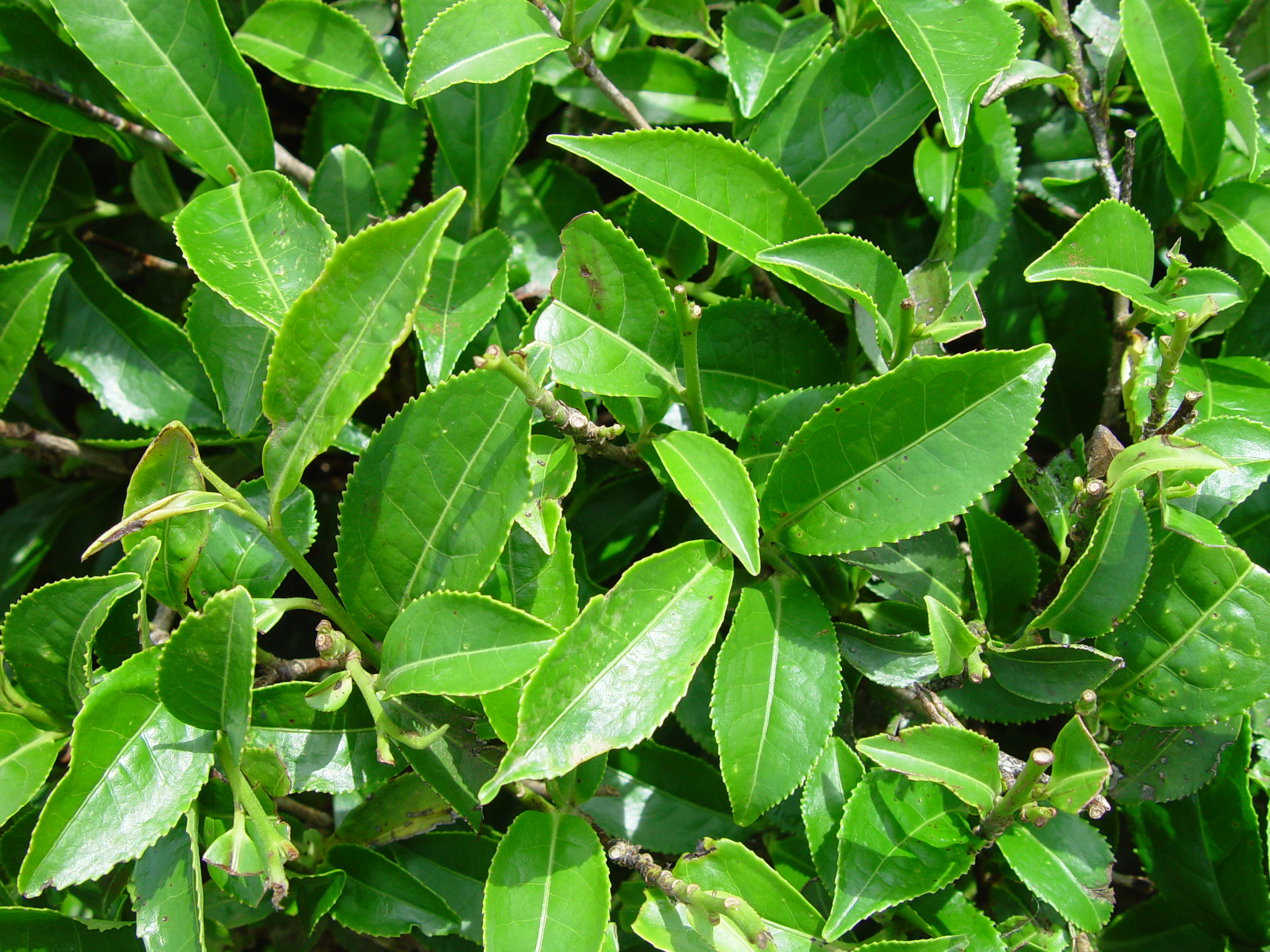

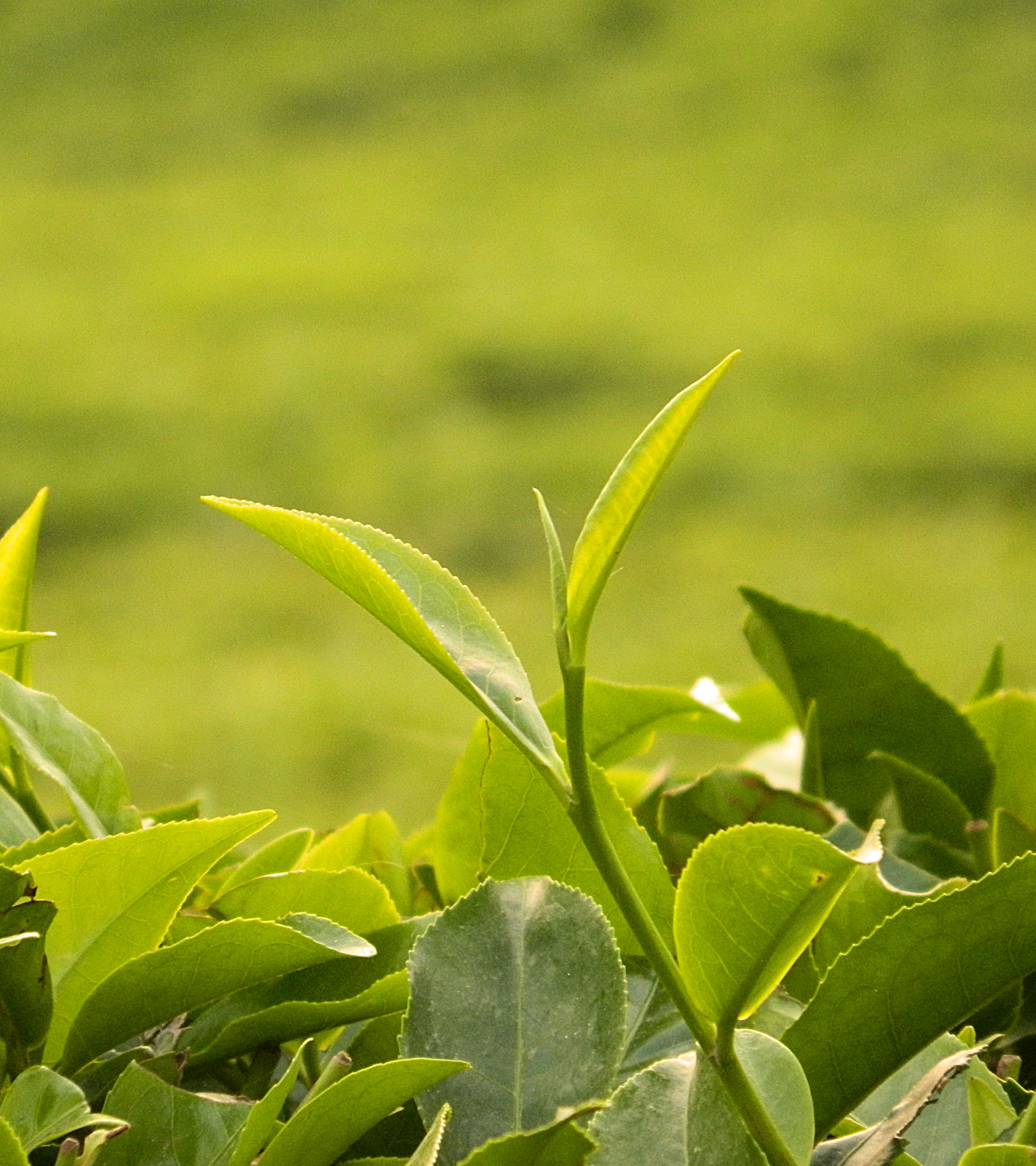
- Camellia sinensis foliage

Conservation status
- Data Deficient (IUCN 3.1)

Scientific classification
- Kingdom: Plantae
- Clade: Tracheophytes
- Clade: Angiosperms
- Clade: Eudicots
- Clade: Asterids
- Order: Ericales
- Family: Theaceae
- Genus: Camellia
- Species: C. sinensis

Binomial name
- Camellia sinensis (L.) Kuntze

Synonyms
- Camellia thea Link; Thea sinensis L.

= Camellia sinensis =

Species of evergreen shrub

Camellia sinensis, commonly known as tea plant, tea shrub, and tea tree, (Note: Camellia sinensis is unrelated to Melaleuca alternifolia, the source of tea tree oil, or the genus Leptospermum, commonly called tea tree.) is a species of evergreen shrub in the flowering plant family Theaceae. The leaves harvested from C. sinesis are brewed into tea.

Originally native to the highlands of the Hengduan–Purvanchal region between southwestern China, northern Myanmar and northeastern India, the leaves, buds and stems of C. sinensis are harvested by humans to produce tea, leading to its artificial introduction and cultivation as valuable cash crops in many other parts of the world, with China, India and Kenya being the three largest tea-producing countries.

Tea leaves used to make white tea, yellow tea, green tea, oolong, dark tea (which includes pu'er tea) and black tea (aka red tea) are all made from two of the five varieties of C. sinensis that form the bulk of the tea crops now grown, C. sinensis var. sinensis and C. sinensis var. assamica, but are processed differently to attain varying levels of oxidation, with black tea being the most oxidized and white being the least. Kukicha (twig tea) is also made from C. sinensis, but uses only twigs and stems rather than leaves and buds.

== Names ==
The name sinensis is a compound meaning "from China" in Botanical Latin. The two parts are sin from Latin meaning China and -ensis the suffix meaning place of origin.

The generic name Camellia is taken from the Latinized name of Rev. Georg Kamel, SJ (1661–1706), a Moravian-born Jesuit lay brother, pharmacist, and missionary to the Philippines.

Camellia sinensis is widely known by the common name tea tree, a name in use since 1760. However, it is also used to refer to shrubs or trees of the myrtle family from Australia and New Zealand, most frequently species in Leptospermum or Melaleuca the first usage dating to 1790. Tea trees are also variously called tea-bushes, tea-shrubs, and tea-plants.

== Description ==
Camellia sinensis is a woody shrub or tree that is typically 1 to 5 m (3.3 to 16.4 ft) tall, but can be as tall as 20 m (66 ft). It is usually trimmed to a height of about 1 m (3.3 ft) with a flat top when in commercial tea plantations. The bark on trunks is smooth and gray with a yellow or brown tone. Young branches are yellow with a gray cast to them while new twigs are red-purple with white hairs. In older trees the trunk reaches as much as 40 cm in diameter.

In seedlings the taproot is dominant, but in mature plants the distribution of roots depends upon individual plant characteristics and growing conditions. In areas with shallow soils or high water tables tea bushes will have a shallow, fibrous root system while in areas with deep soils root have been found at depths of 5.5 m. Tea bushes reach peak productivity at ages of 30 to 50 years, but can remain productive for over a century.

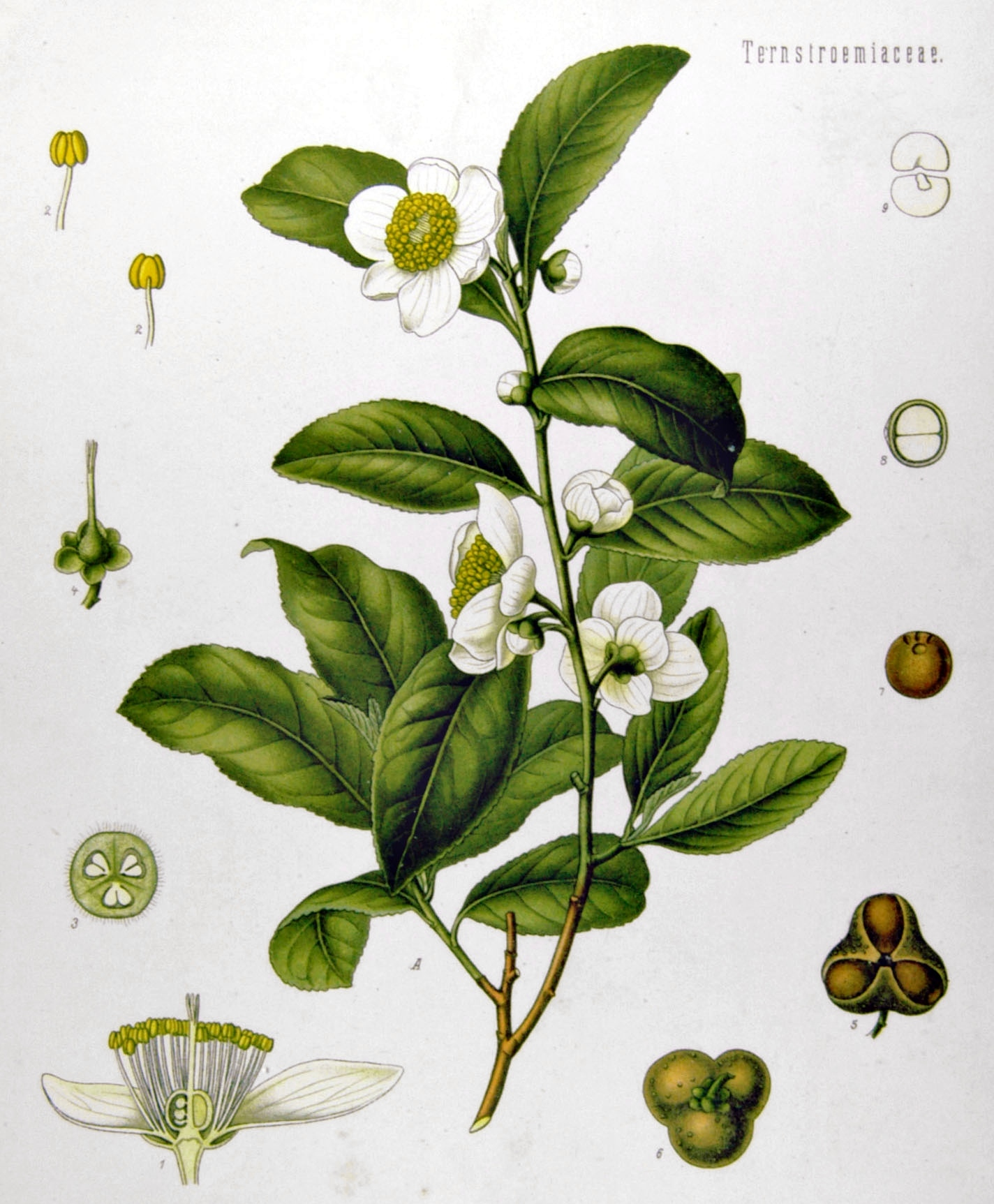
C. sinensis plant, with cross-section of the flower (lower left) and seeds (lower right)

The leaves are an attractive green and tend to be smaller on cultivated plants than wild ones, ranging in size from 4 to 22 cm (1.5 to 8.5 in) and a width of 2 to 7.7 cm (0.8 to 3.0 in). Their shape is elliptic, oblong-elliptic, or oblong, and they have a leathery texture. The upper surface is shining dark green and hairless while the underside is pale green and can be hairless or pubescent, covered in plant hairs. The center vein is raised above the surface of the leaf on both sides as are the smaller seven to nine veins to each side. The netlike veins between are also visible. The leaf tip has a wide angle and the edges are serrate to serrulate, having asymmetrical teeth that point forwards to very fine serrations.

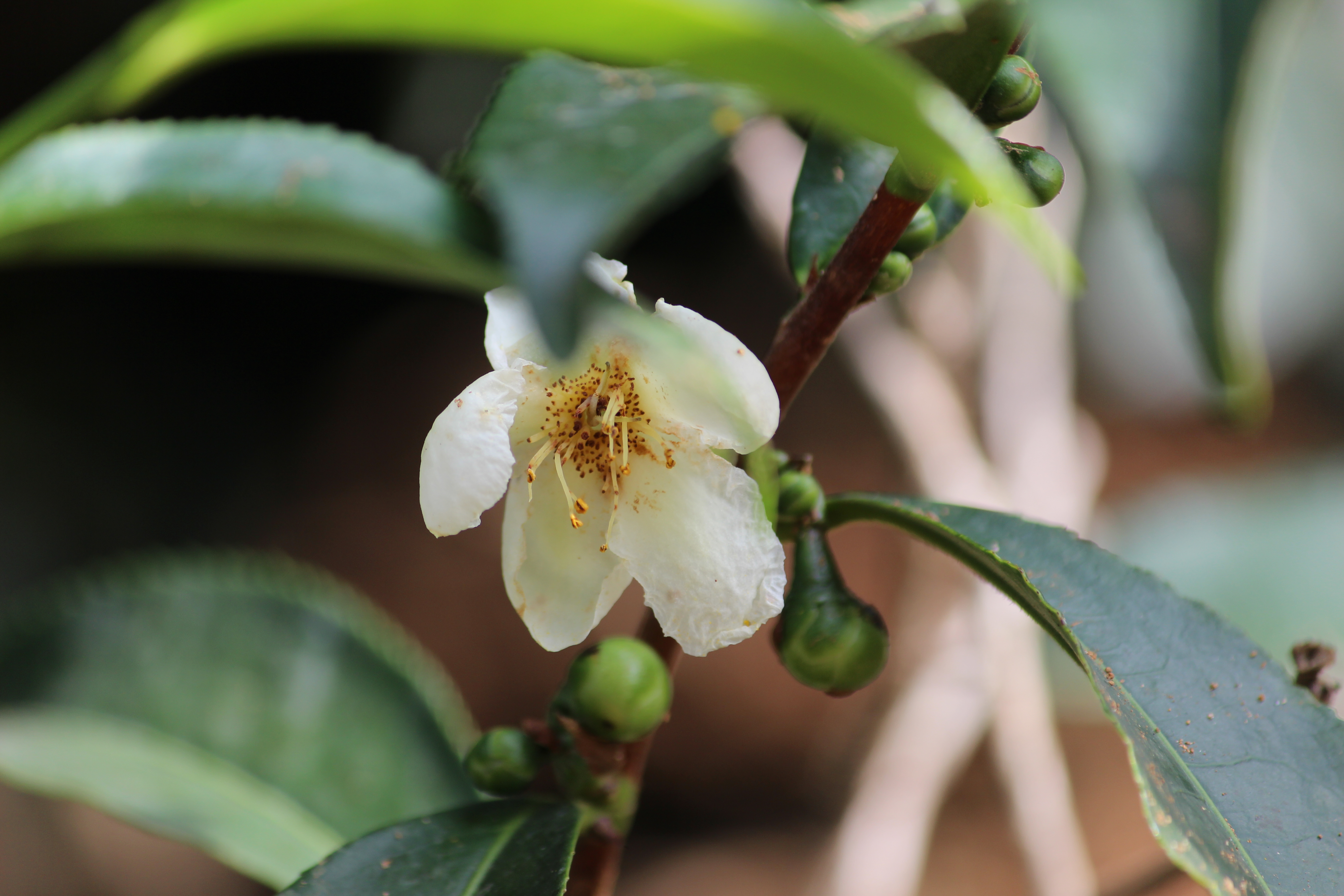
Flower of tea plant

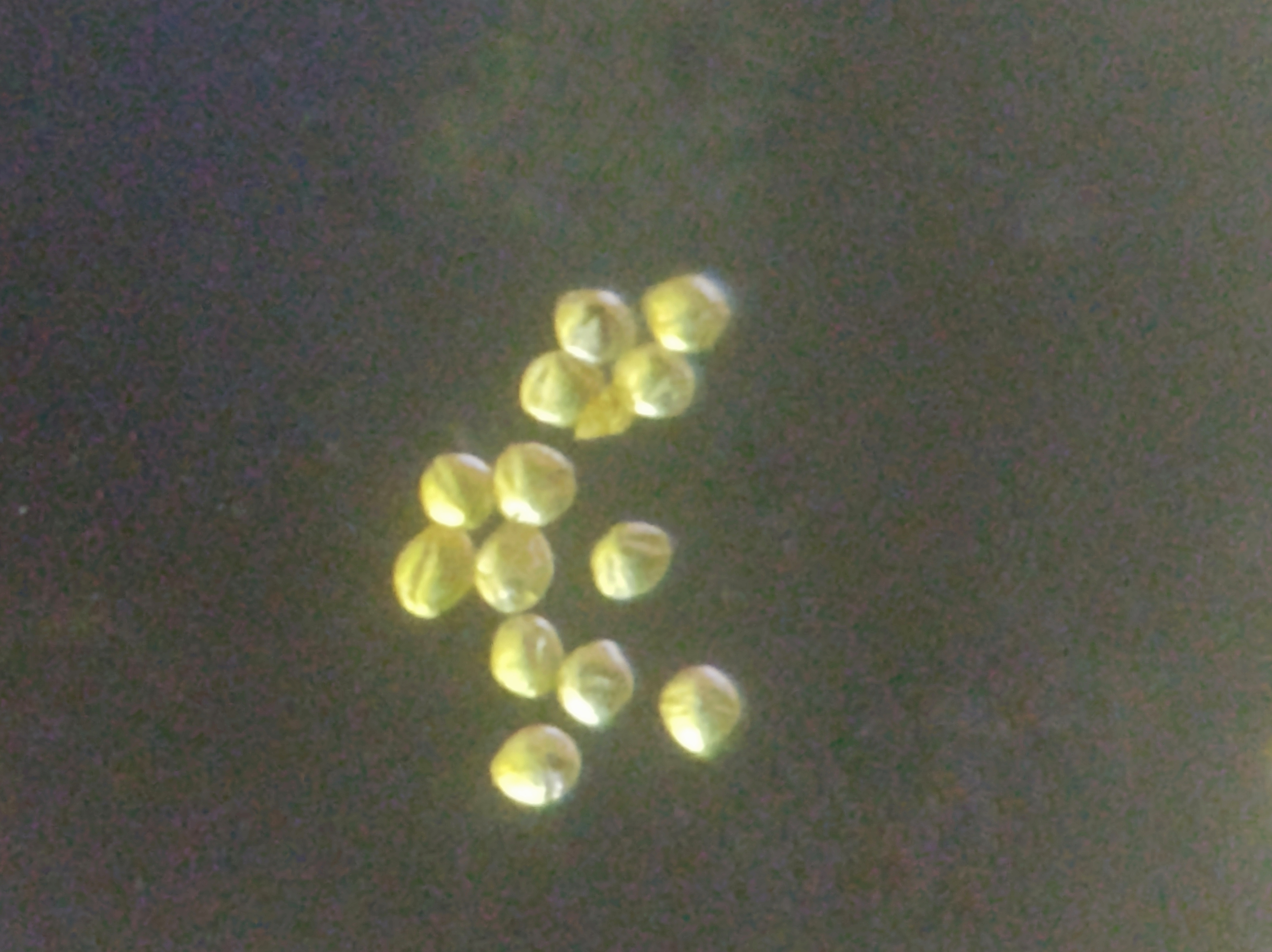
Pollen grains of C. sinensis

The flowers are white, 2.5 to 3.5 cm (1 to 1.5 in) across with six to eight petals. They bud in the leaf axils and can be solitary or have up to three in a cluster. On the back of the flower there will be five sepals 3–5 mm long. One to three of the petals will be somewhat sepal-like and hidden behind the five visible at the front of the flower. The center of the flower is filled with numerous hairless stamens 8–13 mm long. They are arranged in as many as five concentric circles called whorls.

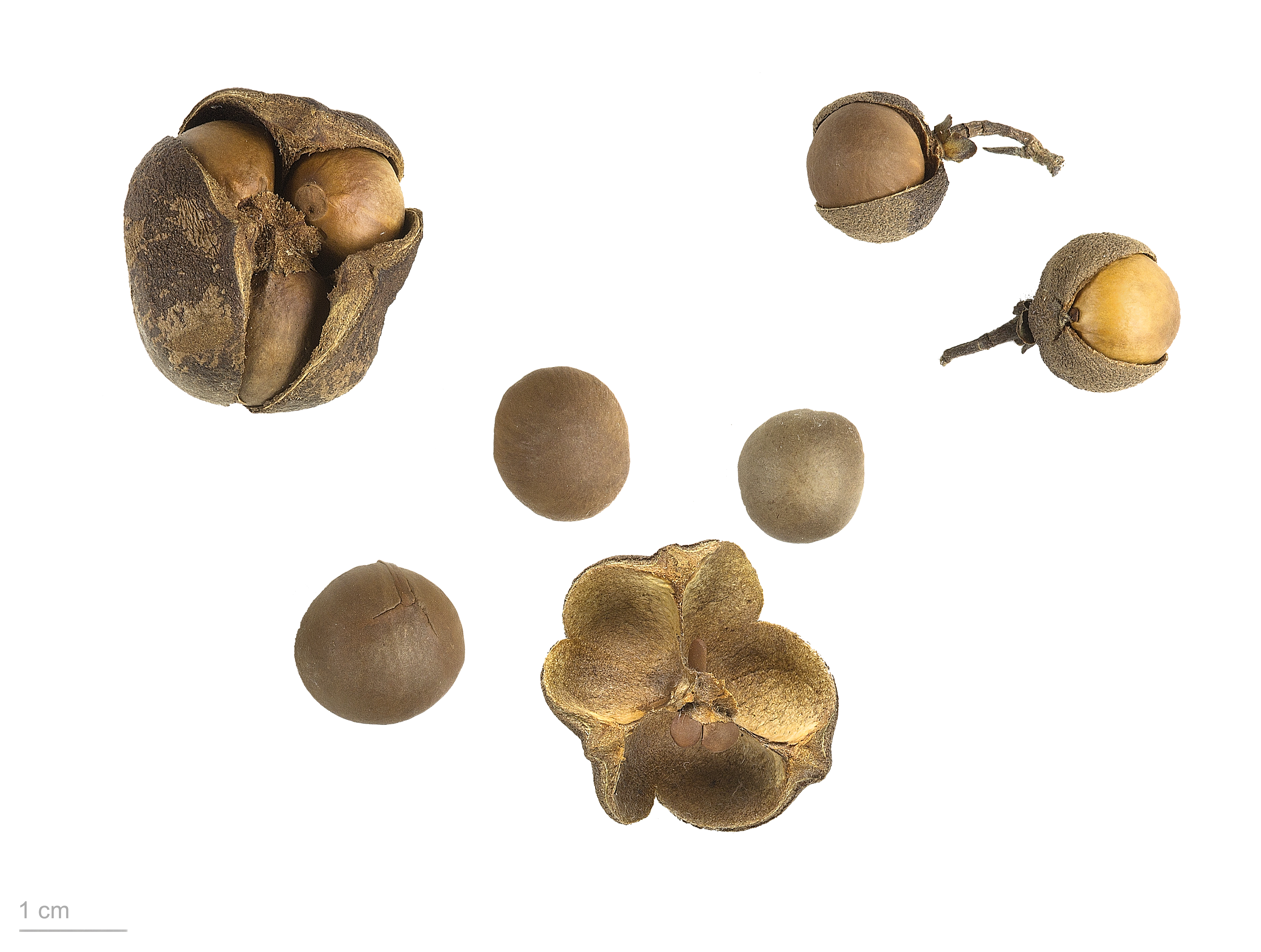
C. sinensis fruit and seeds

The fruit is a capsule with globe shape, usually flattened at the ends and measuring 1–1.5 cm top to bottom and 1.5-3.5 cm in diameter. Each fruit will have one to three round chambers with one or two seeds in each. The seeds are brown to almost black in color and are round, half-spheres, or have mulpile flat faces. They measure 1 to 2 cm and are hairless.

== Taxonomy ==
Linnaeus did not consider this plant a Camellia but placed it in a separate genus Thea. Then in 1818, Robert Sweet merged the two genera, selecting Camellia for the merged genus, and shifted all the former Thea species to that genus.

Five varieties of Camellia sinensis are accepted:

Image	Name	Description	Distribution
	C. sinensis var. sinensis	Style fused apically 3-lobed. Widely grown for tea.	China (Fujian, Guangdong, Guizhou, Guangxi, Hainan, Hunan, Hubei, Jiangxi, Jiangsu, Anhui, Sichuan, Shaanxi, Yunnan, Zhejiang), Taiwan
	C. sinensis var. assamica (J.W.Masters) Kitamura	Lower surface of leaves are villous along midvein. Widely grown for tea.	Bhutan, China (Guangdong, Guangxi, Hainan, Yunnan), Laos, Myanmar, Nepal, Thailand, Vietnam
	C. sinensis var. pubilimba Hung T. Chang	Sepals are white and pubescent.	China (W. Guangdong, Guangxi, Hainan, SE. Yunnan)
	C. sinensis var. dehungensis (Hung T. Chang & B.H.Chen) T.L.Ming	Lower surface of leaf is appressed pubescent.	China (S. Yunnan)
	C. sinensis var. madoensis T. V. Nguyen, V. D. Luong & N. T. Le	Style is free half to the base.	Vietnam (Phu Yen)

Camellia sinensis has 82 synonyms of the species or of four of its five varieties. This includes 45 species names.

Table of Synonyms
Name	Year	Rank	Synonym of:	Notes
Camellia angustifolia Hung T.Chang	1981	species	var. pubilimba	= het.
Camellia arborescens Hung T.Chang, F.L.Yu & P.S.Wang	1983	species	var. sinensis	= het.
Camellia assamica (Royle ex Hook.) C.D.Darl & Jan.Ammal	1945	species	var. assamica	≡ hom.
Camellia assamica var. kucha Hung T.Chang, H.S.Wang & B.H.Chen	1983	variety	var. assamica	= het.
Camellia assamica subsp. lasiocalyx (G.Watt) W.Wight	1962	subspecies	var. assamica	= het.
Camellia assamica var. polyneura (Hung T.Chang, Y.J.Tan & P.S.Wang) Hung T.Chang	1998	variety	var. assamica	= het.
Camellia bohea (L.) Sweet	1818	species	var. viridis	= het.
Camellia dehungensis Hung T.Chang, H.S.Wang & B.H.Chen	1983	species	var. dehungensis	≡ hom.
Camellia dehungensis Hung T.Chang & B.H.Chen	1984	species	var. dehungensis	= het., nom. illeg.
Camellia dishiensis F.C.Zhang, X.Y.Chen & G.B.Chen	1990	species	var. pubilimba	= het.
Camellia formosensis (Masam. & S.Suzuki) M.H.Su, C.F.Hsieh & C.H.Tsou	2009	species	var. viridis	= het.
Camellia kucha (Hung T.Chang, H.S.Wang & B.H.Chen) Hung T.Chang	2008	species	var. assamica	= het.
Camellia longlingensis F.C.Zhang, G.B.Chen & M.D.Tang	1990	species	var. viridis	= het.
Camellia manglaensis Hung T.Chang, Y.J.Tan & P.S.Wang	1983	species	var. dehungensis	= het.
Camellia multisepala Hung T.Chang, Y.J.Tan & P.S.Wang	1983	species	var. assamica	= het.
Camellia oleosa (Lour.) Rehder	1937	species	var. virescens	≡ hom.
Camellia parvisepala Hung T.Chang	1981	species	var. pubilimba	= het.
Camellia parvisepaloides Hung T.Chang, H.S.Wang & B.H.Chen	1983	species	var. dehungensis	= het.
Camellia polyneura Hung T.Chang, Y.J.Tan & P.S.Wang	1983	species	var. assamica	= het.
Camellia scottiana Choisy	1855	species	var. assamica	= het., not validly publ.
Camellia sinensis var. dulcamara Q.U.Le & D.L.Nguyen	2020	variety	var. assamica	= het.
Camellia sinensis f. formosensis (Masam. & S.Suzuki) Kitam.	1950	form	var. virescens	≡ hom.
Camellia sinensis var. kucha Hung T.Chang & S.S.Wang	1984	variety	var. assamica	= het.
Camellia sinensis var. lasiocalyx (G.Watt) A.P.Das & C.Ghosh	2016	variety	var. assamica	= het.
Camellia sinensis f. macrophylla (C.Morren) Kitam.	1950	form	var. virescens	= het.
Camellia sinensis f. parvifolia (Miq.) Sealy	1958	form	D. viridis	≡ hom.
Camellia sinensis f. rosea (Makino) Kitam.	1950	form	D. viridis	≡ hom.
Camellia sinensis f. ticinensis (Pollacci & Gallotti) Ardenghi	2020	form	var. virescens	= het., cited basionym not validly publ.
Camellia sinensis var. waldenae (S.Y.Hu) Hung T.Chang	1981	variety	var. virescens	≡ hom.
Camellia tenuistipa Orel, Curry & Luu	2015	species	var. assamica	= het.
Camellia thea Link	1822	species	C. sinensis	≡ hom., nom. superfl.
Camellia thea var. assamica (Royle ex Hook.) Boerl.	1901	variety	var. assamica	≡ hom.
Camellia thea var. bohea (L.) G.Watt	1907	variety	D. viridis	≡ hom.
Camellia thea var. lasiocalyx G.Watt	1907	variety	var. assamica	= het.
Camellia thea var. stricta (Hayne) G.Watt	1907	variety	var. virescens	= het.
Camellia thea f. ticinensis Pollacci & Gallotti	1940	form	var. virescens	= het., nom. nud.
Camellia thea var. viridis (L.) G.Watt	1907	variety	var. virescens	= het.
Camellia theifera Griff.	1854	species	var. assamica	= het.
Camellia theifera var. assamica (Royle ex Hook.) Greshoff	1893	variety	var. assamica	≡ hom.
Camellia theifera var. macrophylla (C.Morren) Matsum.	1883	variety	var. viridis	= het.
Camellia viridis Sweet	1818	species	D. viridis	≡ hom.
Camellia waldenae S.Y.Hu	1977	species	var. viridis	= het.
Thea assamica Royle ex Hook.	1847	species	var. assamica	≡ hom.
Thea bohea L.	1762	species	var. virescens	= het.
Thea bohea var. laxa Aiton	1789	variety	var. virescens	= het.
Thea bohea var. stricta Aiton	1789	variety	var. virescens	= het.
Thea cantoniensis Lour.	1790	species	var. viridis	= het.
Thea chinensis Sims	1807	species	var. virescens	≡ hom., orth. var.
Thea cochinchinensis Lour.	1790	species	var. assamica	= het.
Thea formosensis Masam. & S.Suzuki	1937	species	var. virescens	= het.
Thea grandifolia Salisb.	1796	species	var. viridis	= het.
Thea latifolia Lodd. ex Sweet	1839	species	var. virescens	≡ hom.
Thea laxa Staunton	1798	species	D. viridis	≡ hom.
Thea longifolia Nois. ex Steud.	1821	species	var. viridis	= het., not validly publ.
Thea macrophylla (C.Morren) Makino	1918	species	var. viridis	= het.
Thea olearia Lour. ex Gomes Mach.	1868	species	var. viridis	= het.
Thea oleosa Lour.	1790	species	var. viridis	= het.
Thea parvifolia Salisb.	1796	species	var. virescens	= het.
Thea sasanqua var. oleosa (Lour.) Pierre	1887	variety	var. viridis	= het.
Thea sinensis L.	1753	species	C. sinensis	≡ hom.
Thea sinensis var. assamica (Royle ex Hook.) Pierre	1887	variety	var. assamica	≡ hom., nom. illeg.
Thea sinensis var. assamica Guilf.	1883	variety	var. assamica	= het.
Thea sinensis var. bohea (L.) K.Koch	1853	variety	var. viridis	= het.
Thea sinensis var. cantoniensis (Lour.) Pierre	1887	variety	var. virescens	≡ hom.
Thea sinensis var. diffusa C.Morren	1835	variety	D. viridis	≡ hom.
Thea sinensis var. macrophylla C.Morren	1835	variety	var. virescens	= het.
Thea sinensis var. parvifolia Miq.	1867	variety	var. viridis	= het.
Thea sinensis var. pubescens Pierre	1887	variety	var. virescens	= het.
Thea sinensis var. rosea Makino	1905	variety	var. viridis	= het.
Thea sinensis var. rugosa C.Morren	1835	variety	var. viridis	= het.
Thea sinensis var. stricta C.Morren	1835	variety	D. viridis	≡ hom.
Thea sinensis var. viridis Pierre	1887	variety	var. virescens	= het.
Thea stricta Hayne	1821	species	var. viridis	= het.
Thea viridis L.	1762	species	var. viridis	= het.
Thea viridis var. assamica (Royle ex Hook.) Choisy	1855	variety	var. assamica	≡ hom.
Thea viridis var. bohea (L.) Vent.	1799	variety	var. virescens	= het.
Thea viridis variegata J.Dix	1861		var. viridis	= het.
Thea yersinii A.Chev. ex Gagnep.	1943	species	var. assamica	= het., without a Latin descr.
Theaphylla anamensis Raf.	1838	species	var. viridis	= het.
Theaphylla cantoniensis (Lour.) Raf.	1838	species	var. viridis	= het.
Theaphylla laxa (Aiton) Raf.	1838	species	var. viridis	= het.
Theaphylla viridis (Sweet) Raf.	1838	species	var. virescens	≡ hom.
Notes: ≡ homotypic synonym; = heterotypic synonym

In 2017, Chinese scientists sequenced the genome of C. s. var. assamica. It contains about three billion base pairs, which is larger than most plants previously sequenced.

The Cambodia type tea ("C. assamica subsp. lasiocalyx") was originally considered a type of Assam tea. However, later genetic work showed that it is a hybrid between Chinese small leaf tea and Assam tea.

- Chinese (small leaf) tea [C. sinensis var. sinensis]
- Chinese Western Yunnan Assam (large leaf) tea [C. sinensis var. assamica]
- Indian Assam (large leaf) tea [C. sinensis var. assamica]
- Chinese Southern Yunnan Assam (large leaf) tea [C. sinensis var. assamica]

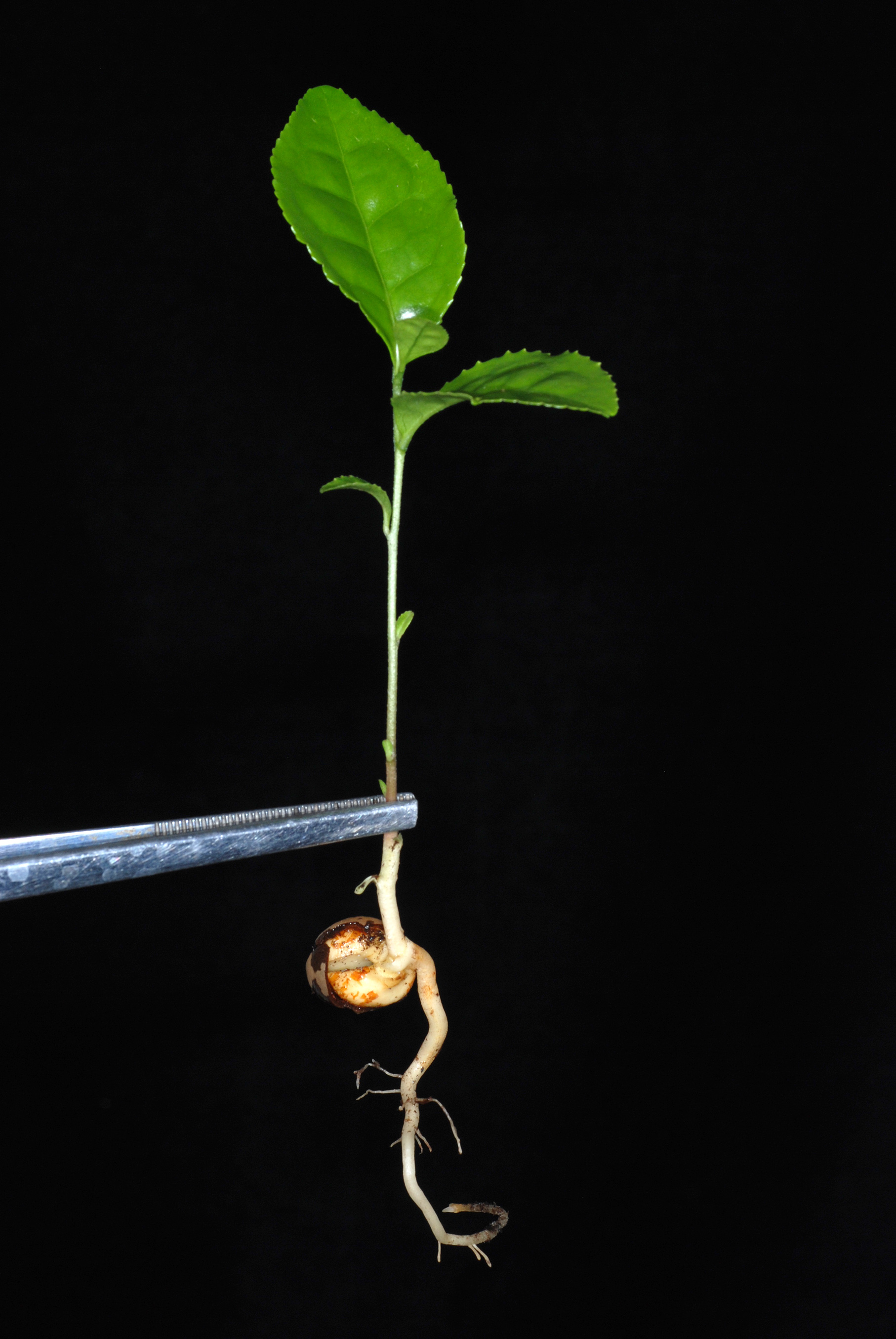
Tea seedling

Chinese (small leaf) tea may have originated in southern China possibly with hybridization of unknown wild tea relatives. However, since no wild populations of this tea are known, the precise location of its origin is speculative.

Given their genetic differences forming distinct clades, Chinese Assam type tea (C. s. var. assamica) may have two different parentages – one being found in southern Yunnan (Xishuangbanna, Pu'er City) and the other in western Yunnan (Lincang, Baoshan). Many types of Southern Yunnan Assam tea have been hybridized with the closely related species Camellia taliensis. Unlike Southern Yunnan Assam tea, Western Yunnan Assam tea shares many genetic similarities with Indian Assam type tea (also C. s. var. assamica). Thus, Western Yunnan Assam tea and Indian Assam tea both may have originated from the same parent plant in the area where southwestern China, Indo-Burma, and Tibet meet. However, as the Indian Assam tea shares no haplotypes with Western Yunnan Assam tea, Indian Assam tea is likely to have originated from an independent domestication. Some Indian Assam tea appears to have hybridized with the species Camellia pubicosta.

Assuming a generation of 12 years, Chinese small leaf tea is estimated to have diverged from Assam tea around 22,000 years ago; this divergence would correspond to the last glacial maximum, while Chinese Assam tea and Indian Assam tea diverged 2,800 years ago.

Chinese small leaf type tea was introduced into India in 1836 by the British and some Indian Assam type tea (e.g. Darjeeling tea) appear to be genetic hybrids of Chinese small leaf type tea, native Indian Assam, and possibly also closely related wild tea species.

== Range and habitat ==
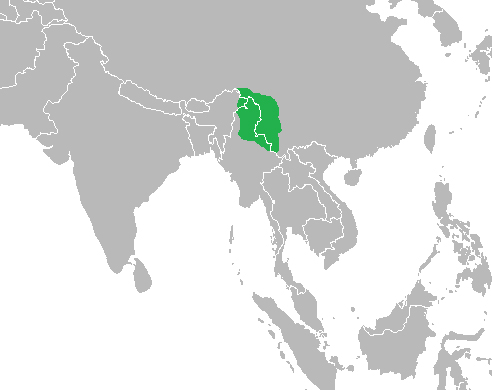
Native range of Camellia sinensis according to the borderlands theory

The origins of tea plants are obscured by their long history of cultivation. The natural range is unknown, though it is reasonably certain that the species comes from East Asia with the exact location being debated by experts.

The borderlands theory suggests the species originated in the borderlands of far eastern India, north Myanmar, and southwestern China. Alternatively, other experts point to an origin to the northeast in Yunnan province within China.

In the Plants of the World Online database many more places are listed as part of the native range including not only southcentral and southwest China, Assam and the eastern Himalayas in India, and Myanmar, but also Laos, Thailand, and Vietnam.

== Cultivation ==
Camellia sinensis is mainly cultivated in tropical and subtropical climates, in areas with at least 127 cm (50 in) of rainfall a year. Tea plants prefer a rich and moist growing location in full to part sun, and can be grown in hardiness zones 7–9. However, the species is commercially cultivated from the equator to as far north as Scotland, with the northernmost tea plantation at 59°N latitude on Shapinsay in the Orkney Islands. Many high quality teas are grown at high elevations, up to 2,200 m (7,200 ft), as the plants grow more slowly and acquire more flavour.

Tea plants will grow into a tree if left undisturbed, but cultivated plants are pruned to waist height for ease of plucking. Two principal varieties are used, the small-leaved Chinese variety plant (C. s. var. sinensis) and the large-leaved Assamese plant (C. s. var. assamica), used mainly for black tea. Tea trees can remain productive for many years.

=== Chinese teas ===
The Chinese plant is a small-leafed bush with multiple stems that reaches a height of some 3 m (9.8 ft). It is native to southeast China. The first tea plant variety to be discovered, recorded, and used to produce tea dates back 3,000 years ago; it yields some of the most popular teas.

C. s. var. waldenae was considered a different species, C. waldenae by SY Hu, but it was later identified as a variety of C. sinensis. This variety is commonly called Waldenae Camellia; it is grown on Sunset Peak and Tai Mo Shan in Hong Kong, and also occurs in Guangxi province.

=== Indian teas ===
Three main kinds of tea are produced in India:

- Assam, from C. s. var. assamica, comes from the near sea-level heavily forested northeastern section of India, the state of Assam. Tea from here is rich and full-bodied. The first tea estate in India was established in Assam in 1837. Teas are manufactured in either the orthodox process or the "crush, tear, curl" (CTC) process.
- Darjeeling, from C. s. var. sinensis, is from the cool and wet Darjeeling highland region, tucked in the foothills of the Himalayas. Tea plantations could be at altitudes as high as 2,200 m (7,200 ft). The tea is delicately flavoured, and considered to be one of the finest teas in the world. The Darjeeling plantations have three distinct harvests, termed 'flushes', and the tea produced from each flush has a unique flavour. First (spring) flush teas are light and aromatic, while the second (summer) flush produces tea with a bit more bite. The third, or autumn flush gives a tea that is lesser in quality.
- Nilgiri is from a southern region of India almost as high as Darjeeling. Grown at elevations between 1,000 and 2,500 m (3,300 and 8,200 ft), Nilgiri teas are subtle and rather gentle, and are frequently blended with other, more robust teas.

=== Japanese teas ===
Tea culture in Japan from as far back as the 9th century has resulted in various types. Japanese cultivars include:

- Benifuuki
- Fushun
- Kanayamidori
- Meiryoku
- Saemidori
- Okumidori
- Yabukita

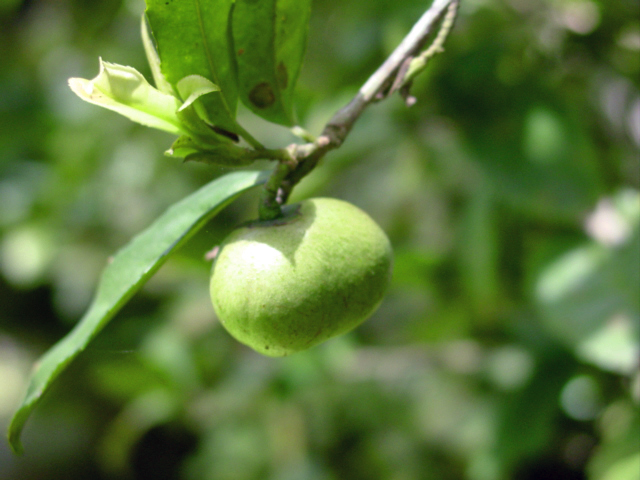
Seed-bearing fruit of C. sinensis

=== Products ===
The seeds of the tea bush (Camellia sinensis) and oil-seed camellia (Camellia oleifera) can be pressed to yield tea oil, a sweetish seasoning and cooking oil.

Tea oil should not be confused with tea tree oil, an essential oil from an unrelated species also called the tea tree (Melaleuca alternifolia). Tea tree oil is used for cosmetics and as alternative medicine, and is not fit for consumption. Tea tree oil is highly toxic when ingested, giving serious side effects that may require medical intervention, especially in children.

=== Pests and diseases ===
Tea leaves are eaten by some herbivores, such as the caterpillars of the willow beauty (Peribatodes rhomboidaria), a geometer moth.

== Health effects ==
There is no high-quality clinical evidence to indicate that drinking tea has any effect on human health. The United States Food and Drug Administration has approved a specific green tea extract ointment for treating genital warts.

Due to the presence of caffeine in tea leaves, anyone who has a sensitivity to caffeine, has been advised to avoid caffeine, or wishes to avoid the effects of caffeine should reconsider before drinking tea.

== Biosynthesis of caffeine ==
Fresh leaves contain about 4% caffeine, as well as related compounds including theobromine. Caffeine functions as a secondary metabolite and acts as a natural pesticide: it can paralyze and kill herbivorous insects feeding on the plant. Caffeine is a purine alkaloid and its biosynthesis occurs in young tea leaves and is regulated by several enzymes. The biosynthetic pathway in C. sinensis is similar to other caffeine-producing plants such as coffee or guayusa. Analysis of the pathway was carried out by harvesting young leaves and using reverse transcription PCR to analyze the genes encoding the major enzymes involved in synthesizing caffeine. The gene TCS1 encodes caffeine synthase. Younger leaves feature high concentrations of TCS1 transcripts, allowing more caffeine to be synthesized during this time. Dephosphorylation of xanthosine-5'-monophosphate into xanthosine is the committed step for the xanthosines entering the beginning of the most common pathway. A sequence of reactions turns xanthosine (9β-D-ribofuranosylxanthine) into 7-methylxanthosine, then 7-methylxanthine, then theobromine (3,7-dimethylxanthine), and finally into caffeine (1,3,7-trimethylxanthine).

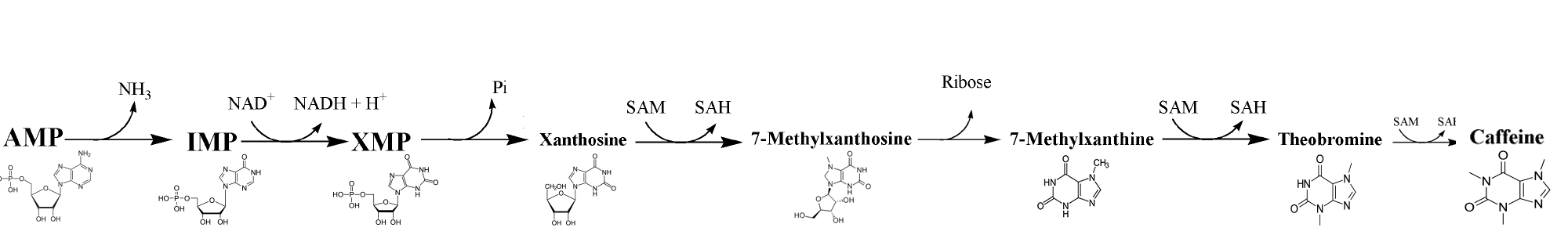
Biochemical pathway detailing caffeine synthesis in C. sinensis

== Primary green tea catechins ==
(–)-Epigallocatechin

(–)-Epigallocatechin gallate

(–)-Epicatechin gallate

(–)-Epicatechin

== See also ==
- Chinese herbology
- Green tea extract
- International Code of Nomenclature for Cultivated Plants
- ISO 3103, a method of brewing tea according to the ISO
- List of tea companies
- Tasseography, a method of divination by reading tea leaves.
- Tea classics
- Tea leaf grading
- Camellia taliensis
