= Guanosine deaminase =

Class of enzymes

Identifiers
- EC no.: 3.5.4.15
- CAS no.: 9067-85-0

Databases
- BRENDA: enzyme data
- ExPASy: NiceZyme view
- KEGG: enzyme entry
- MetaCyc: metabolic pathway
- Rhea: reactions
- PDB structures: RCSB PDB PDBe PDBsum
- Gene Ontology: AmiGO / QuickGO
Search
- PMC: articles
- PubMed: articles
- NCBI: proteins

Guanosine deaminase (EC 3.5.4.15) is an enzyme characterised from bacteria that catalyzes the hydrolysis of the nucleoside, guanosine, to xanthosine and ammonia:

guanosine
H_{2}O
NH_{3}
xanthosine

The enzyme is widespread, being found in animals, invertebrates, and microorganisms, where it is part of the catabolism of purine nucleotides. The plant Arabidopsis thaliana uses a version that is specific for guanosine and 2’-deoxyguanosine only. The plant enzyme is involved in the biosynthesis of caffeine.

This enzyme is a hydrolase, one acting on carbon-nitrogen bonds other than peptide bonds, specifically in cyclic amidines. The systematic name of this enzyme class is guanosine aminohydrolase. It is also called guanosine aminase.
