= DIMP =

DIMP or dIMP may refer to:

- Diisopropyl methylphosphonate, a chemical byproduct in the production of sarin gas
- DIMP (antiandrogen) (N-(3,5-dimethyl-4-isoxazolylmethyl)phthalimide), a nonsteroidal antiandrogen
- Deoxyinosine monophosphate (dIMP)
