= Caffeine synthase =

Enzyme

Identifiers
- EC no.: 2.1.1.160
- CAS no.: 155215-94-4

Databases
- IntEnz: IntEnz view
- BRENDA: BRENDA entry
- ExPASy: NiceZyme view
- KEGG: KEGG entry
- MetaCyc: metabolic pathway
- PRIAM: profile
- PDB structures: RCSB PDB PDBe PDBsum
Search
- PMC: articles
- PubMed: articles
- NCBI: proteins

Caffeine synthase is a methyltransferase enzyme involved in the caffeine biosynthesis pathway. It is expressed in tea species, coffee species, and cocoa species. The enzyme catalyses three related reactions:

theobromine
+ SAM
caffeine
+ SAH

The first is the final methylation step in the biosynthesis of caffeine from xanthosine via theobromine. The methyl group comes from the cofactor, S-adenosyl methionine (SAM), which becomes S-adenosyl-L-homocysteine (SAH).

The second is the reaction which produces theobromine from 7-methylxanthine, a reaction also catalysed by theobromine synthase:

7-methylxanthine
+ SAM
theobromine
+ SAH

Finally, the enyme also converts paraxanthine to caffeine:

paraxanthine
+ SAM
caffeine
+ SAH

Caffeine synthase is expressed in the Camellia species irrawadiensis, ptilophylla, and sinensis; the Coffea species arabica, and canephora; and in Theobroma cacao.
