= Deoxyinosine monophosphate =

Names
- IUPAC name 2’-Deoxy-5’-inosinic acid
- Other names dIMP

Identifiers
CAS Number	3393-18-8
3D model (JSmol)	Interactive image
ChEBI	CHEBI:28806
ChemSpider	82650
ECHA InfoCard	100.020.216
PubChem CID	91531
UNII	T2SLS3P7A9
CompTox Dashboard (EPA)	DTXSID60937065
- InChI: InChI=1S/C10H13N4O7P/c15-5-1-7(21-6(5)2-20-22(17,18)19)14-4-13-8-9(14)11-3-12-10(8)16/h3-7,15H,1-2H2,(H,11,12,16)(H2,17,18,19)/t5-,6+,7+/m0/s1 Key: PHNGFPPXDJJADG-RRKCRQDMSA-N; InChI=1/C10H13N4O7P/c15-5-1-7(21-6(5)2-20-22(17,18)19)14-4-13-8-9(14)11-3-12-10(8)16/h3-7,15H,1-2H2,(H,11,12,16)(H2,17,18,19)/t5-,6+,7+/m0/s1 Key: PHNGFPPXDJJADG-RRKCRQDMBF
- SMILES: O=C3/N=C\Nc1c3ncn1[C@@H]2O[C@@H]([C@@H](O)C2)COP(=O)(O)O

Properties
Chemical formula	C_{10}H_{13}N_{4}O_{7}P
Molar mass	332.209 g·mol^{−1}
- Except where otherwise noted, data are given for materials in their standard state (at 25 °C [77 °F], 100 kPa). Infobox references

Deoxyinosine monophosphate (dIMP) is a nucleoside monophosphate and a derivative of inosinic acid. It can be formed by the deamination of the purine base in deoxyadenosine monophosphate (dAMP). The enzyme deoxyribonucleoside triphosphate pyrophosphohydrolase, encoded by YJR069C in S. cerevisiae and containing (d)ITPase and (d)XTPase activities, hydrolyses dITP, resulting in the release of pyrophosphate and dIMP.

== See also ==
- Xanthosine
- Xanthosine monophosphate
