= DXMT =

DXMT may refer to:

- Caffeine synthase, an enzyme
- DXMT, former callsign of DXOW, an AM radio station in Davao City, Philippines
