= 7-Methylxanthine demethylase =

Class of enzymes

Identifiers
- EC no.: 1.14.13.128

Databases
- IntEnz: IntEnz view
- BRENDA: BRENDA entry
- ExPASy: NiceZyme view
- KEGG: KEGG entry
- MetaCyc: metabolic pathway
- PRIAM: profile
- PDB structures: RCSB PDB PDBe PDBsum
Search
- PMC: articles
- PubMed: articles
- NCBI: proteins

7-Methylxanthine demethylase (EC 1.14.13.128) is an enzyme with systematic name 7-methylxanthine:oxygen oxidoreductase (demethylating). This enzyme catalyses the following chemical reaction

7-Methylxanthine
+ NADH
O_{2} + H^{+}
H_{2}O
Xanthine
+ NAD^{+} + H_{2}CO

The four substrates of this enzyme are 7-methylxanthine, reduced nicotinamide adenine dinucleotide (NADH), oxygen, and a proton. Its products are xanthine, oxidised NAD^{+}, water, and formaldehyde.

The enzyme is a non-heme iron protein that is part of the pathway of caffeine degradation in Pseudomonas putida.
