= AA560 =

Chemical compound

Clinical data
- Other names: AA-560; N-(2-Chloromethyl-2-hydroxypropionyl)-3,4,5-trichloroaniline
- Routes of administration: By mouth
- Drug class: Nonsteroidal antiandrogen

Identifiers
- IUPAC name: 2-Hydroxy-2-methyl-N-(3,4,5-trichlorophenyl)propanamide
- CAS Number: 65372-80-7
- PubChem CID: 125204
- ChemSpider: 111441
- UNII: 3HS29B4W75
- CompTox Dashboard (EPA): DTXSID80983988

Chemical and physical data
- Formula: C_{10}H_{10}Cl_{3}NO_{2}
- Molar mass: 282.55 g·mol^{−1}
- 3D model (JSmol): Interactive image
- SMILES: CC(C)(C(=O)NC1=CC(=C(C(=C1)Cl)Cl)Cl)O
- InChI: InChI=1S/C10H10Cl3NO2/c1-10(2,16)9(15)14-5-3-6(11)8(13)7(12)4-5/h3-4,16H,1-2H3,(H,14,15); Key:FVEPMRZJQUYLRA-UHFFFAOYSA-N

AA560 is an orally active nonsteroidal antiandrogen (NSAA) that was developed in Japan and was first described in the literature in 1977 but was never marketed. It is an anilide derivative and analogue of the NSAA flutamide, and shows greater in vivo antiandrogenic potency than does flutamide. Similarly to flutamide, AA560 is a selective antagonist of the androgen receptor (AR) and consequently shows progonadotropic effects by increasing levels of gonadotropins and testosterone via disinhibition of the hypothalamic-pituitary-gonadal axis.

== See also ==
- DIMP
