= 7-methylxanthosine synthase =

Class of enzymes

Identifiers
- EC no.: 2.1.1.158

Databases
- BRENDA: enzyme data
- ExPASy: NiceZyme view
- KEGG: enzyme entry
- MetaCyc: metabolic pathway
- Rhea: reactions
- PDB structures: RCSB PDB PDBe PDBsum
Search
- PMC: articles
- PubMed: articles
- NCBI: proteins

7-methylxanthosine synthase (EC 2.1.1.158) is an enzyme that catalyzes the chemical reaction

xanthosine
+ SAM
7-methylxanthosine
+ SAH

This is a methylation reaction in which the nucleoside, xanthosine, is converted to 7-methylxanthosine. The methyl group comes from the cofactor, S-adenosyl methionine (SAM), which becomes S-adenosyl-L-homocysteine (SAH). The enzyme was characterised from Coffea arabica.

This enzyme belongs to the family of transferases, specifically those transferring one-carbon group methyltransferases. The systematic name of this enzyme class is S-adenosyl-L-methionine:xanthosine N7-methyltransferase. Other names in common use include xanthosine methyltransferase, XMT, xanthosine:S-adenosyl-L-methionine methyltransferase, CtCS1, CmXRS1, CaXMT1, and S-adenosyl-L-methionine:xanthosine 7-N-methyltransferase. This reaction is the first methylation step in the biosynthesis of caffeine and theobromine.
