= Purine =

Heterocyclic aromatic organic compound

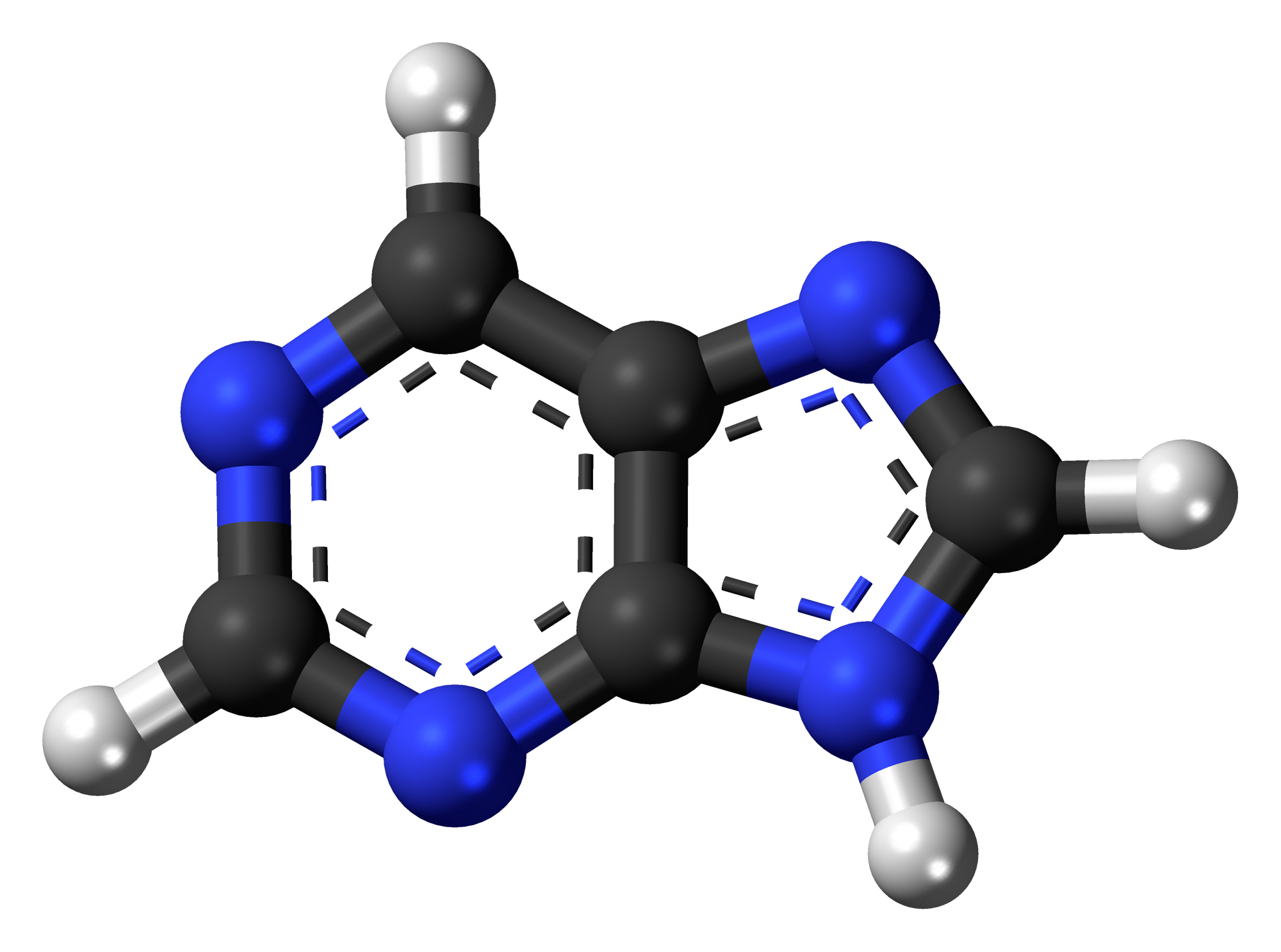

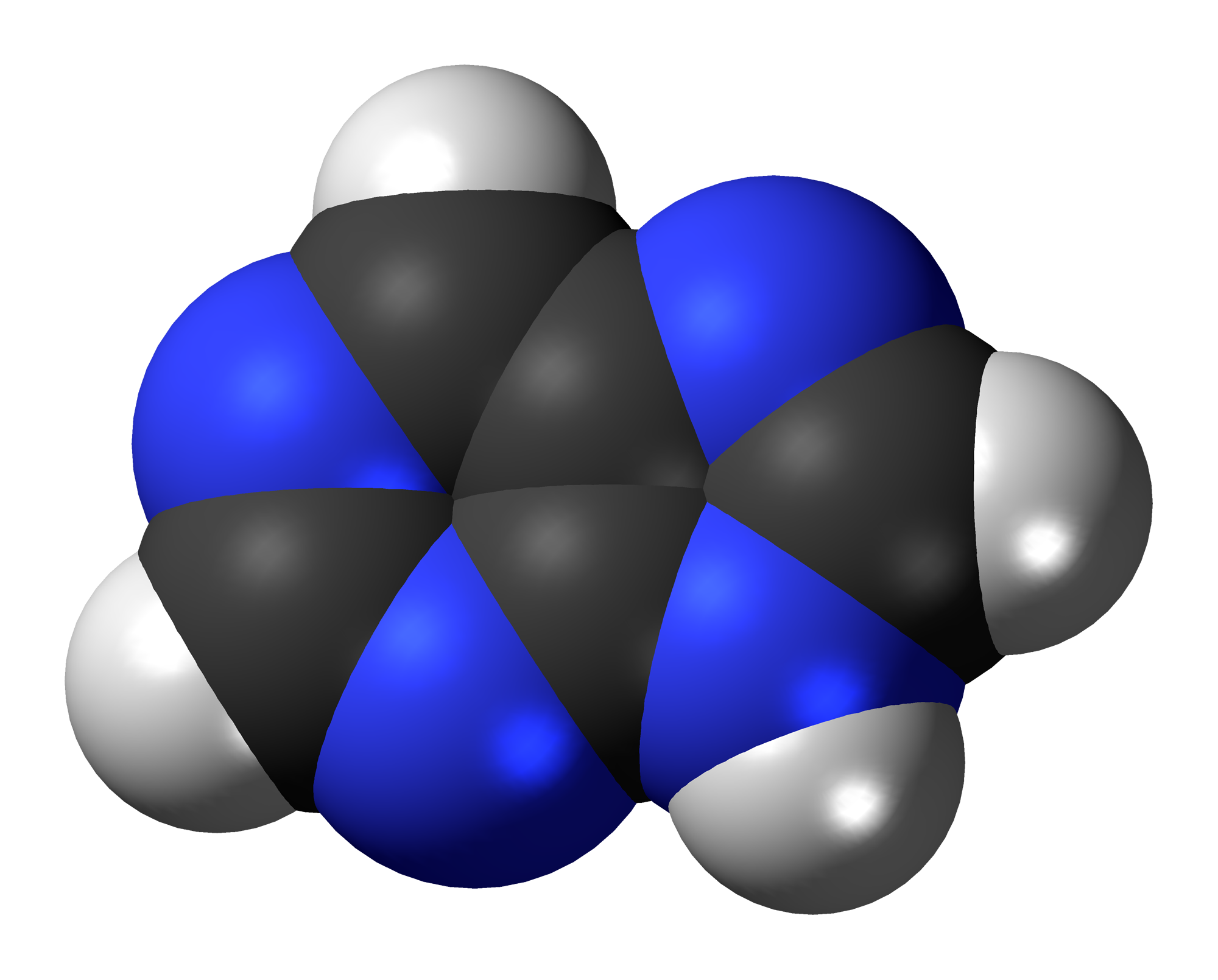

Names
- IUPAC name 9H-purine

Identifiers
| CAS Number | 120-73-0 |
| 3D model (JSmol) | Interactive image |
| ChEBI | CHEBI:17257 |
| ChEMBL | ChEMBL302239 |
| ChemSpider | 1015 |
| ECHA InfoCard | 100.004.020 |
| KEGG | C15587 |
| MeSH | Purine |
| PubChem CID | 1044 |
| UNII | W60KTZ3IZY |
| CompTox Dashboard (EPA) | DTXSID5074470 |
- InChI: InChI=1S/C5H4N4/c1-4-5(8-2-6-1)9-3-7-4/h1-3H,(H,6,7,8,9) Key: KDCGOANMDULRCW-UHFFFAOYSA-N; InChI=1/C5H4N4/c1-4-5(8-2-6-1)9-3-7-4/h1-3H,(H,6,7,8,9) Key: KDCGOANMDULRCW-UHFFFAOYAO
- SMILES: c1c2c(nc[nH]2)ncn1

Properties
| Chemical formula | C_{5}H_{4}N_{4} |
| Molar mass | 120.115 g·mol^{−1} |
| Melting point | 214 °C (417 °F; 487 K) |
| Solubility in water | 500 g/L (RT) |
- Except where otherwise noted, data are given for materials in their standard state (at 25 °C [77 °F], 100 kPa). verify (what is ?) Infobox references

Purine is a heterocyclic aromatic organic compound that consists of two rings (pyrimidine and imidazole) fused together. It is water-soluble. Purine also gives its name to the wider class of molecules, purines, which include substituted purines and their tautomers. They are the most widely occurring nitrogen-containing heterocycles in nature.

In nucleic acids, two types of nucleobases are purine derivatives: adenine (A) and guanine (G).

== Dietary sources ==
Purines are found in high concentration in meat and meat products, especially internal organs, such as liver and kidney, and in various seafoods, high-fructose beverages, alcohol, and yeast products. Examples of high-purine food sources include anchovies, sardines, liver, beef, kidneys, brains, monkfish, dried mackerel, and shrimp.

Foods particularly rich in hypoxanthine, adenine, and guanine lead to higher blood levels of uric acid. Foods having more than 200 mg of hypoxanthine per 100 g, particularly red and fish meats containing hypoxanthine as more than 50% of total purines, are more likely to increase uric acid levels. Some vegetables, such as cauliflower, spinach, and peas, have considerable levels of purines, but do not contribute to elevated uric acid levels, possibly due to digestion and bioavailability factors.

Dairy products, soy foods, cereals, beans, mushrooms, and coffee are low-purine foods, characterized specifically by low levels of adenine and guanine comprising more than 60% of purines. A low-purine dietary plan that may reduce the risk of hyperuricemia and gout includes eggs, dairy products, fruits, vegetables, legumes, mushrooms, and soy products.

== Biochemistry ==
Purines and pyrimidines make up the two groups of nitrogenous bases, including the two groups of nucleotide bases. The purine bases are guanine (G) and adenine (A) which form corresponding nucleosides-deoxyribonucleosides (deoxyguanosine and deoxyadenosine) with deoxyribose moiety and ribonucleosides (guanosine, adenosine) with ribose moiety. These nucleosides with phosphoric acid form corresponding nucleotides (deoxyguanylate, deoxyadenylate and guanylate, adenylate) which are the building blocks of DNA and RNA, respectively. Purine bases also play an essential role in many metabolic and signalling processes within the compounds guanosine monophosphate (GMP) and adenosine monophosphate (AMP).

In order to perform these essential cellular processes, both purines and pyrimidines are needed by the cell, and in similar quantities. Both purine and pyrimidine are self-inhibiting and activating. When purines are formed, they inhibit the enzymes required for more purine formation. This self-inhibition occurs as they also activate the enzymes needed for pyrimidine formation. Pyrimidine simultaneously self-inhibits and activates purine in a similar manner. Because of this, there is nearly an equal amount of both substances in the cell at all times.

== Properties ==
Purine is both a very weak acid (pK_{a} 8.93) and an even weaker base (pK_{a} 2.39).

Purine is aromatic, having four tautomers each with a hydrogen bonded to a different one of the four nitrogen atoms. These are identified as 1-H, 3-H, 7-H, and 9-H (see image of numbered ring). The common crystalline form favours the 7-H tautomer, while in polar solvents both the 9-H and 7-H tautomers predominate. Substituents to the rings and interactions with other molecules can shift the equilibrium of these tautomers.

== Notable purines ==
There are many naturally occurring purines. They include the nucleotide bases adenine and guanine. In DNA, these bases form hydrogen bonds with their complementary pyrimidines, thymine and cytosine, respectively. This is called complementary base pairing. In RNA, the complement of adenine is uracil instead of thymine.

Other notable purines are hypoxanthine, xanthine, theophylline, theobromine, caffeine, uric acid and isoguanine.

== Functions ==
Aside from the crucial roles of purines (adenine and guanine) in DNA and RNA, purines are also significant components in a number of other important biomolecules, such as ATP, GTP, cyclic AMP, NADH, and coenzyme A. Purine (1) itself, has not been found in nature, but it can be produced by organic synthesis.

They may also function directly as neurotransmitters, acting upon purinergic receptors. Adenosine activates adenosine receptors.

== History ==
The word purine (pure urine) was coined by the German chemist Emil Fischer in 1884. He synthesized it for the first time in 1898. The starting material for the reaction sequence was uric acid (8), which had been isolated from kidney stones by Carl Wilhelm Scheele in 1776. Uric acid was reacted with PCl_{5} to give 2,6,8-trichloropurine, which was converted with HI and PH_{4}I to give 2,6-diiodopurine. The product was reduced to purine using zinc dust.

Conversion of uric acid (left) to purine (right) via 2,6,8-trichloropurine and 2,6-diiodopurine intermediates

== Metabolism ==
Many organisms have metabolic pathways to synthesize and break down purines.

Purines are biologically synthesized as nucleosides (bases attached to ribose).

Accumulation of modified purine nucleotides is defective to various cellular processes, especially those involving DNA and RNA. To be viable, organisms possess a number of deoxypurine phosphohydrolases, which hydrolyze these purine derivatives removing them from the active NTP and dNTP pools. Deamination of purine bases can result in accumulation of such nucleotides as ITP, dITP, XTP and dXTP.

Defects in enzymes that control purine production and breakdown can severely alter a cell's DNA sequences, which may explain why people who carry certain genetic variants of purine metabolic enzymes have a higher risk for some types of cancer.

=== Purine biosynthesis in the three domains of life ===
Organisms in all three domains of life, eukaryotes, bacteria and archaea, are able to carry out de novo biosynthesis of purines. This ability reflects the essentiality of purines for life. The biochemical pathway of synthesis is very similar in eukaryotes and bacterial species, but is more variable among archaeal species. A nearly complete, or complete, set of genes required for purine biosynthesis was determined to be present in 58 of the 65 archaeal species studied. However, also identified were seven archaeal species with entirely, or nearly entirely, absent purine encoding genes. Apparently the archaeal species unable to synthesize purines are able to acquire exogenous purines for growth., and are thus analogous to purine mutants of eukaryotes, e.g. purine mutants of the Ascomycete fungus Neurospora crassa, that also require exogenous purines for growth.

== Laboratory synthesis ==
In addition to in vivo synthesis of purines in purine metabolism, purine can also be synthesized artificially.

Purine is obtained in good yield when formamide is heated in an open vessel at 170 °C for 28 hours.

This reaction and others like it have been discussed in the context of the origin of life.

Oro and Kamat (1961) and Orgel co-workers (1966, 1967) have shown that four molecules of HCN tetramerize to form diaminomaleodinitrile (12), which can be converted into almost all naturally occurring purines. For example, five molecules of HCN condense in an exothermic reaction to make adenine, especially in the presence of ammonia.

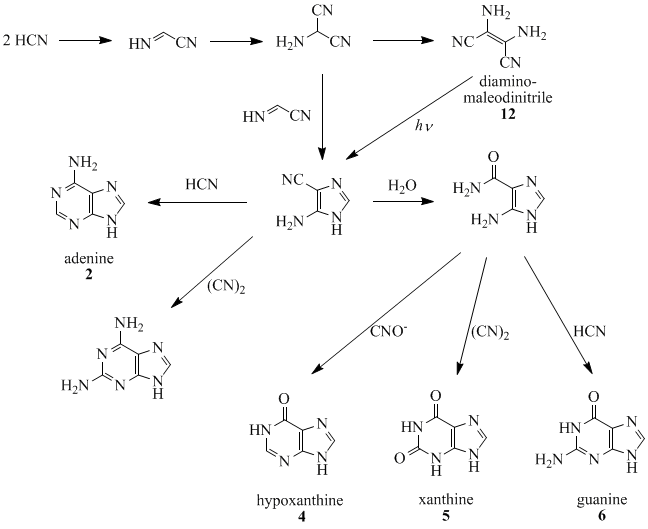

The Traube purine synthesis (1900) is a classic reaction (named after Wilhelm Traube) between an amine-substituted pyrimidine and formic acid.

== Prebiotic synthesis of purine ribonucleosides ==
In order to understand how life arose, knowledge is required of the chemical pathways that permit formation of the key building blocks of life under plausible prebiotic conditions. Nam et al. (2018) demonstrated the direct condensation of purine and pyrimidine nucleobases with ribose to give ribonucleosides in aqueous microdroplets, a key step leading to RNA formation. Also, a plausible prebiotic process for synthesizing purine ribonucleosides was presented by Becker et al. in 2016.

== See also ==
- Purinones
- Pyrimidine
- Simple aromatic rings
- Transition
- Transversion
