= GMP synthase =

GMP synthetase (glutamine-hydrolysing)
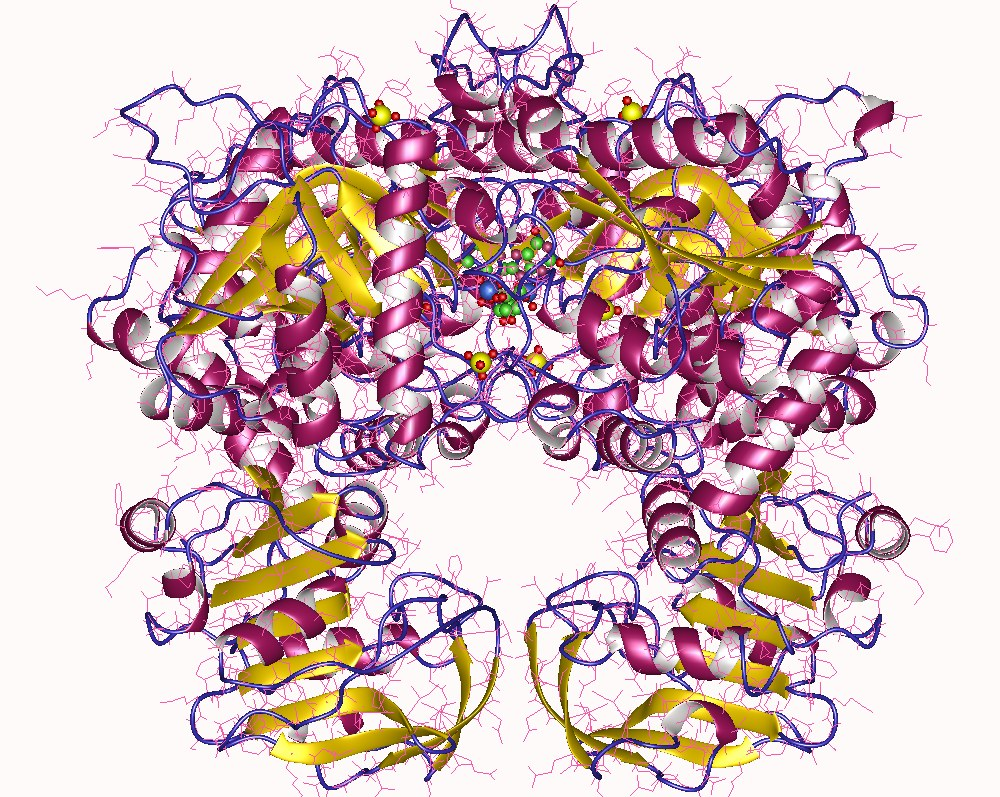
- GMP synthetase, human

Identifiers
- EC no.: 6.3.5.2
- CAS no.: 37318-71-1

Databases
- BRENDA: enzyme data
- ExPASy: NiceZyme view
- KEGG: enzyme entry
- MetaCyc: metabolic pathway
- Rhea: reactions
- PDB structures: RCSB PDB PDBe PDBsum
- Gene Ontology: AmiGO / QuickGO
Search
- PMC: articles
- PubMed: articles
- NCBI: proteins

GMP synthetase C terminal domain
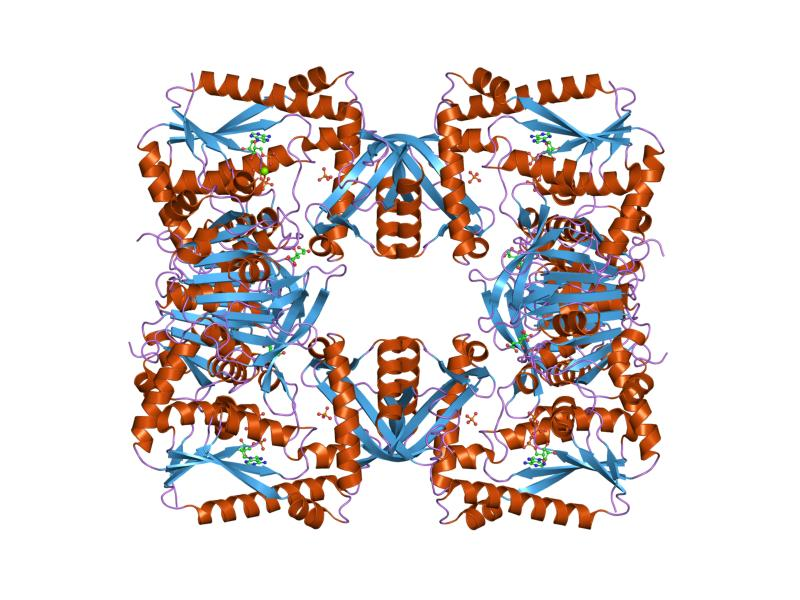
- escherichia coli gmp synthetase complexed with amp and pyrophosphate.

Identifiers
- Symbol: GMP_synt_C
- Pfam: PF00958
- InterPro: IPR001674
- PROSITE: PDOC00405
- SCOP2: 1gpm / SCOPe / SUPFAM
Available protein structures:
- PDB: IPR001674 PF00958 (ECOD; PDBsum)
- AlphaFold: IPR001674; PF00958

GMPS
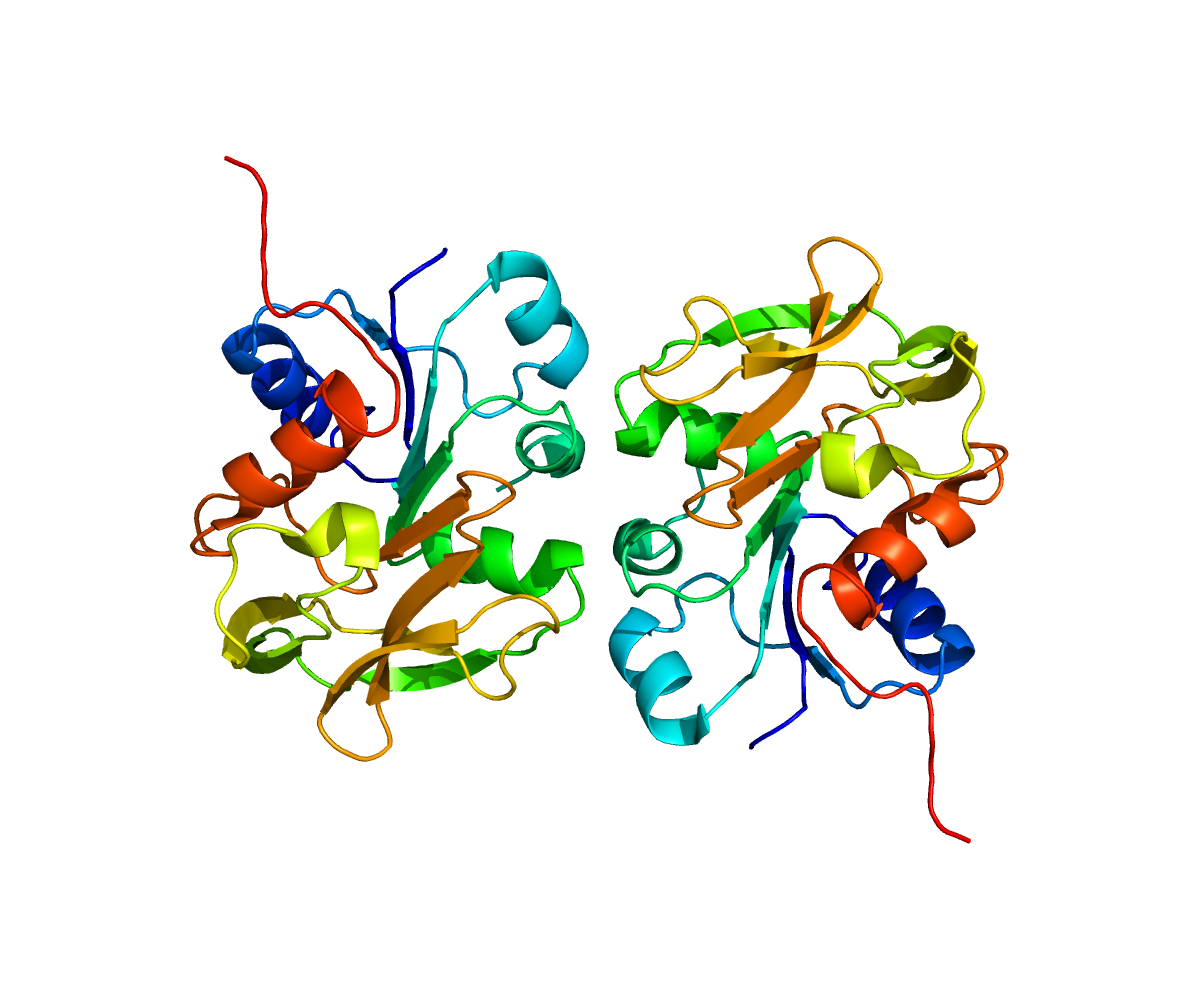

Identifiers
- Aliases: GMPS, GMP synthase, guanine monophosphate synthase, GATD7, GMP synthase
- External IDs: OMIM: 600358; MGI: 2448526; GeneCards: GMPS
Available structures
PDB	Ortholog search: PDBe RCSB
PDB	List of PDB id codes 2VPI, 2VXO
Enzyme activity
EC #	BRENDA	ExPASy	KEGG	MetaCyc
6.3.5.2	↗	↗	↗	↗

Gene location (Human)
Chr.	Chromosome 3 (human)
Band	3q25.31	Start	155,870,650 bp
Band	3q25.31	End	155,944,020 bp

Gene location (Mouse)
Chr.	Chromosome 3 (mouse)
Band	3|3 E1	Start	63,883,527 bp
Band	3|3 E1	End	63,930,000 bp
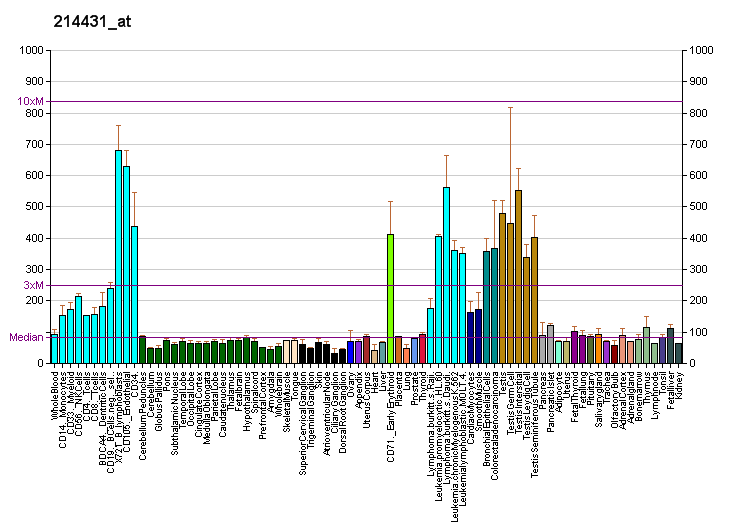
RNA expression pattern
Bgee	Human / Mouse (ortholog); Top expressed in: left testis; right testis; ventricular zone; ganglionic eminence; stromal cell of endometrium; Achilles tendon; islet of Langerhans; smooth muscle tissue; body of pancreas; epithelium of colon / Top expressed in: otic vesicle; hand; seminiferous tubule; mandibular prominence; maxillary prominence; primitive streak; abdominal wall; Rostral migratory stream; mammillary body; dorsomedial hypothalamic nucleus; More reference expression data
BioGPS	More reference expression data
Gene ontology
Molecular function	nucleotide binding; ligase activity; pyrophosphatase activity; ATP binding; GMP synthase (glutamine-hydrolyzing) activity; GMP synthase activity
Cellular component	cytoplasm; cytosol
Biological process	purine nucleotide biosynthetic process; glutamine metabolic process; purine nucleobase biosynthetic process; purine ribonucleoside monophosphate biosynthetic process; GMP biosynthetic process
Sources:Amigo / QuickGO
Orthologs
Databases	NCBI: entry; OMA: entry
Species	Human	Mouse
Entrez	8833	229363
Ensembl	ENSG00000163655	ENSMUSG00000027823
UniProt	P49915	Q3THK7
RefSeq (mRNA)	NM_003875	NM_001033300
RefSeq (protein)	NP_003866	NP_001028472
Location (UCSC)	Chr 3: 155.87 – 155.94 Mb	Chr 3: 63.88 – 63.93 Mb
PubMed search
- Wikidata
View/Edit Human	View/Edit Mouse

Guanosine monophosphate synthetase, (EC 6.3.5.2) also known as GMPS is an enzyme that converts xanthosine monophosphate to guanosine monophosphate.

In the de novo synthesis of purine nucleotides, IMP is the branch point metabolite at which point the pathway diverges to the synthesis of either guanine or adenine nucleotides. In the guanine nucleotide pathway, there are 2 enzymes involved in converting IMP to GMP, namely IMP dehydrogenase (IMPD1), which catalyzes the oxidation of IMP to XMP, and GMP synthetase, which catalyzes the amination of XMP to GMP.

== Enzymology ==
In enzymology, a GMP synthetase (glutamine-hydrolysing) (EC 6.3.5.2) is an enzyme that catalyzes the chemical reaction

ATP + xanthosine 5'-phosphate + L-glutamine + H_{2}O $\rightleftharpoons$ AMP + diphosphate + GMP + L-glutamate

The 4 substrates of this enzyme are ATP, xanthosine 5'-phosphate, L-glutamine, and H_{2}O, whereas its 4 products are AMP, diphosphate, GMP, and L-glutamate.

This enzyme belongs to the family of ligases, specifically those forming carbon-nitrogen bonds carbon-nitrogen ligases with glutamine as amido-N-donor. The systematic name of this enzyme class is xanthosine-5'-phosphate:L-glutamine amido-ligase (AMP-forming). This enzyme participates in purine metabolism and glutamate metabolism. At least one compound, Psicofuranin is known to inhibit this enzyme.

== Structural studies ==
As of late 2007, 5 structures have been solved for this class of enzymes, with PDB accession codes PDB: 1GPM, PDB: 1WL8, PDB: 2A9V, PDB: 2D7J, and PDB: 2DPL.

== Role in metabolism ==
=== Purine metabolism ===
GMP synthase is the second step in the generation of GMP from IMP; the first step occurs when IMP dehydrogenase generates XMP, and then GMP synthetase is able to react with glutamine and ATP to generate GMP. IMP may also be generated into AMP by adenylosuccinate synthetase and then adenylosuccinate lyase.

=== Amino acid metabolism ===
GMP synthase is also involved in amino acid metabolism because it generates L-glutamate from L-glutamine.

== Organismal involvement ==
This enzyme is widely distributed and a number of crystal structures have been solved, including in Escherichia coli, Pyrococcus Horikoshii, Thermoplasma acidophil, Homo sapiens, Thermus thermophilus and Mycobacterium tuberculosis. The most extensive structural studies have been done in E. coli.

== Structure and function ==
GMP synthase forms a tetramer in an open box shape, which is a dimer of dimers. The R interfaces are held together with a hydrophobic core and a beta sheet, while the P dimer interfaces do not have a hydrophobic core and are more variable than the R interfaces. This enzyme also binds several ligands, including phosphate, pyrophosphate, AMP, citrate and Magnesium.

=== Class I Amidotransferase Domain ===
The amidotransferase domain is responsible for removal of the amide nitrogen from the glutamine substrate. The class I amidotransferase domain is made of the N terminal 206 residues of the enzyme, and consists of 12 beta strands and 5 alpha helices; the core of this domain is an open 7-stranded mixed beta sheet. Its catalytic triad includes Cys86, His181 and Glu183. His181 is a base and Glu183 is a Hydrogen bond acceptor from the Histidine imidazole ring. Cys86 is the catalytic residue and is conserved. It falls into a nucleophile elbow, where it is at the end of a beta strand and the beginning of an alpha helix, and has little flexibility in its phi and psi angles; thus, Gly84 and Gly88 are conserved and allow for the tight packing of amino acids surrounding the catalytic residue.

=== Synthetase Domain: ATP Pyrophosphatase domain ===
The synthetase domain is responsible for the addition of the abstracted Nitrogen to the acceptor substrate. The ATP Pyrophosphatase domain consists of a beta sheet containing 5 parallel strands with several alpha helices on each side. The P loop is the nucleotide binding motif; residues 235-241 make up the P loop which specifically binds to pyrophosphate.

The structure of this domain is what creates the specificity of this enzyme for ATP. The binding pocket forms hydrophobic interactions with the adenine ring, and the backbone of Val260 forms H bonds with multiple Nitrogens in the ring of AMP, which excludes substituents on the C2 purine ring. This creates extreme specificity for adenine and ATP binding.
