= ITPA =

Protein-coding gene in the species Homo sapiens

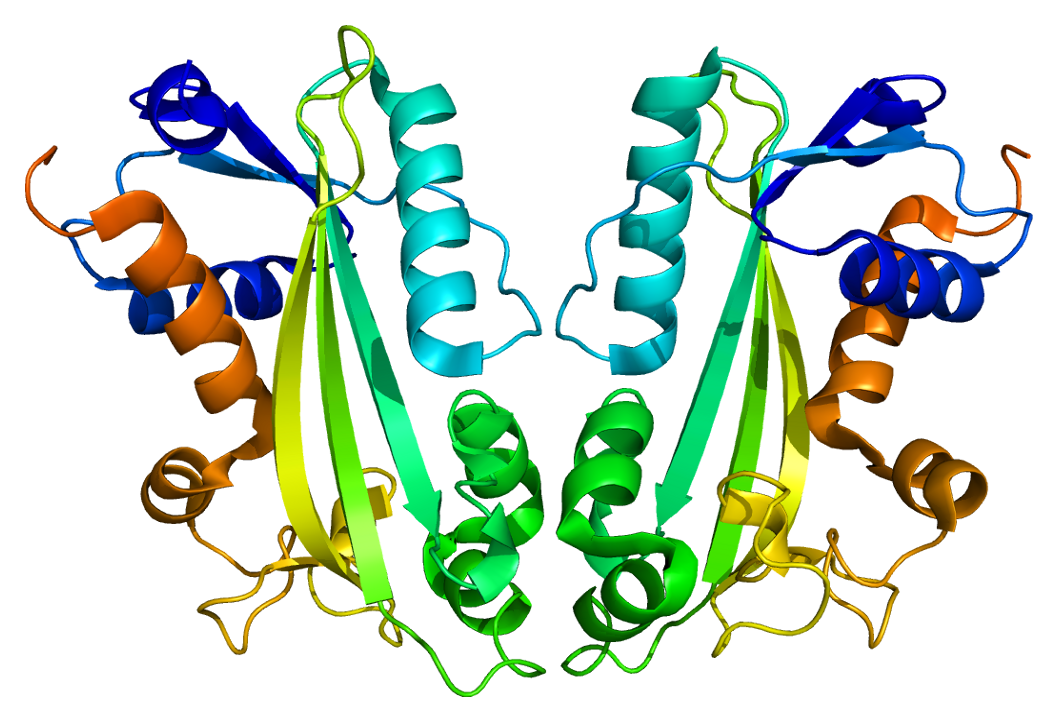

Identifiers
- Aliases: ITPA, C20orf37, HLC14-06-P, dJ794I6.3, My049, ITPase, NTPase, inosine triphosphatase, DEE35
- External IDs: OMIM: 147520; MGI: 96622; GeneCards: ITPA
Available structures
PDB	Ortholog search: PDBe RCSB
PDB	List of PDB id codes 2CAR, 2I5D, 2J4E, 4F95
Enzyme activity
EC #	BRENDA	ExPASy	KEGG	MetaCyc
3.6.1.66	↗	↗	↗	↗

Gene location (Human)
Chr.	Chromosome 20 (human)
Band	20p13	Start	3,208,868 bp
Band	20p13	End	3,223,870 bp

Gene location (Mouse)
Chr.	Chromosome 2 (mouse)
Band	2 F1|2 63.24 cM	Start	130,509,530 bp
Band	2 F1|2 63.24 cM	End	130,523,534 bp
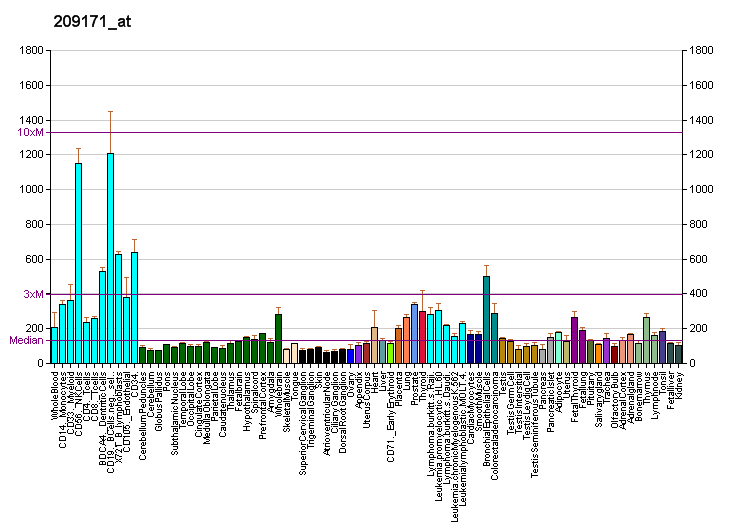
RNA expression pattern
Bgee	Human / Mouse (ortholog); Top expressed in: right lobe of thyroid gland; left lobe of thyroid gland; mucosa of transverse colon; right adrenal cortex; right uterine tube; left adrenal gland; left adrenal cortex; mucosa of esophagus; granulocyte; skin of leg / Top expressed in: embryo; embryo; ventricular zone; endocardial cushion; epiblast; primitive streak; morula; ganglionic eminence; neural tube; otic placode; More reference expression data
BioGPS	More reference expression data
Gene ontology
Molecular function	nucleotide binding; dITP diphosphatase activity; XTP diphosphatase activity; ITP diphosphatase activity; hydrolase activity; metal ion binding; nucleotide diphosphatase activity; NADH pyrophosphatase activity; nucleoside-triphosphate diphosphatase activity; identical protein binding
Cellular component	cytoplasm; cytosol
Biological process	ITP catabolic process; nucleotide metabolic process; chromosome organization; nucleoside triphosphate catabolic process; purine nucleotide catabolic process; deoxyribonucleoside triphosphate catabolic process
Sources:Amigo / QuickGO
Orthologs
Databases	NCBI: entry; OMA: entry
Species	Human	Mouse
Entrez	3704	16434
Ensembl	ENSG00000125877	ENSMUSG00000074797
UniProt	Q9BY32	Q9D892
RefSeq (mRNA)	NM_001267623; NM_033453; NM_181493; NM_001324236; NM_001324237 NM_001324238; NM_001324240; NM_001351739	NM_025922; NM_001362648
RefSeq (protein)	NP_001254552; NP_001311165; NP_001311166; NP_001311167; NP_001311169 NP_258412; NP_852470; NP_001338668	NP_080198; NP_001349577
Location (UCSC)	Chr 20: 3.21 – 3.22 Mb	Chr 2: 130.51 – 130.52 Mb
PubMed search
- Wikidata
View/Edit Human	View/Edit Mouse

Inosine triphosphate pyrophosphatase is an enzyme that in humans is encoded by the ITPA gene, by the rdgB gene in bacteria E.coli and the HAM1 gene in yeast S. cerevisiae; the protein is also encoded by some RNA viruses of the Potyviridae family. Two transcript variants encoding two different isoforms have been found for this gene. Also, at least two other transcript variants have been identified which are probably regulatory rather than protein-coding.

== Function ==
The protein encoded by this gene hydrolyzes inosine triphosphate and deoxyinosine triphosphate to the monophosphate nucleotide and diphosphate. The enzyme possesses specificity to multiple substrates, and acts on other nucleotides including xanthosine triphosphate and deoxyxanthosine triphosphate. The encoded protein, which is a member of the HAM1 NTPase protein family, is found in the cytoplasm and acts as a homodimer.

== Clinical significance ==
Defects in the encoded protein can result in inosine triphosphate pyrophosphorylase deficiency. The enzyme ITPase dephosphorylates ribavirin triphosphate in vitro to ribavirin monophosphate, and reduced ITPase activity in 30% of humans potentiates mutagenesis in hepatitis C virus. Gene variants predicting reduced predicted ITPase activity have been associated with decreased risk of ribavirin-induced anemia, increased risk of thrombocytopenia, lower ribavirin concentrations, as well as a ribavirin-like reduced relapse risk following interferon-based therapy for hepatitis C virus (HCV) genotype 2 or 3 infection.
