= Theobromine synthase =

Class of enzymes

Identifiers
- EC no.: 2.1.1.159

Databases
- IntEnz: IntEnz view
- BRENDA: BRENDA entry
- ExPASy: NiceZyme view
- KEGG: KEGG entry
- MetaCyc: metabolic pathway
- PRIAM: profile
- PDB structures: RCSB PDB PDBe PDBsum
Search
- PMC: articles
- PubMed: articles
- NCBI: proteins

Theobromine synthase (EC 2.1.1.159) is an enzyme that catalyzes the chemical reaction

7-Methylxanthine
+ SAM
Theobromine
+ SAH

This is a methylation reaction in which the 7-methylxanthine is converted to theobromine. The methyl group comes from the cofactor, S-adenosyl methionine (SAM), which becomes S-adenosyl-L-homocysteine (SAH). The enzyme was characterised from coffee plants.

This enzyme belongs to the family of transferases, specifically those transferring one-carbon group methyltransferases. The systematic name of this enzyme class is S-adenosyl-L-methionine:7-methylxanthine N3-methyltransferase. Other names in common use include monomethylxanthine methyltransferase, MXMT, CTS1, CTS2, and S-adenosyl-L-methionine:7-methylxanthine 3-N-methyltransferase. The reaction is part of the biosynthesis pathway to caffeine.
