= DIMP (antiandrogen) =

Chemical compound

Clinical data
- Other names: Ro 7-8117; N-(3,5-Dimethyl-4-isoxazolylmethyl)phthalimide
- Drug class: Nonsteroidal antiandrogen

Identifiers
- IUPAC name: 2-[(3,5-dimethyl-1,2-oxazol-4-yl)methyl]-2,3-dihydro-1H-isoindole-1,3-dione
- CAS Number: 39962-28-2
- PubChem CID: 135035
- ChemSpider: 118991
- UNII: BW49C59ULP
- ChEMBL: ChEMBL1710671
- CompTox Dashboard (EPA): DTXSID40193001

Chemical and physical data
- Formula: C_{14}H_{12}N_{2}O_{3}
- Molar mass: 256.261 g·mol^{−1}
- 3D model (JSmol): Interactive image
- SMILES: CC1=C(C(=NO1)C)CN2C(=O)C3=CC=CC=C3C2=O
- InChI: InChI=1S/C14H12N2O3/c1-8-12(9(2)19-15-8)7-16-13(17)10-5-3-4-6-11(10)14(16)18/h3-6H,7H2,1-2H3; Key:SHPRUADECKZSMQ-UHFFFAOYSA-N

DIMP (developmental code name Ro 7-8117), or N-(3,5-dimethyl-4-isoxazolylmethyl)phthalimide, is a nonsteroidal antiandrogen (NSAA) structurally related to thalidomide (which also binds to and antagonizes the androgen receptor (AR)) that was first described in 1973 and was never marketed. Along with flutamide, it was one of the earliest NSAAs to be discovered, and for this reason, has been described as a "classical" NSAA. The drug is a selective, competitive, silent antagonist of the AR, although it is described as an "only relatively weak competitor". Its relative binding affinity for the androgen receptor is about 2.6% of that of metribolone. DIMP possesses no androgenic, estrogenic, progestogenic, or antigonadotropic activity, but it does reverse the antigonadotropic effects of testosterone, indicating that, like other pure AR antagonists, it is progonadotropic.

DIMP is the lead antiandrogen of the phthalimide group of nonsteroidal AR ligands, and a variety of AR ligands with higher affinity for the AR have been derived from DIMP and thalidomide.

== See also ==
- AA560
- BOMT
