= Inosine triphosphate =

Names
- IUPAC name Inosine 5′-(tetrahydrogen triphosphate)
- Systematic IUPAC name O^{1}-{[(2R,3S,4R,5R)-3,4-Dihydroxy-5-(6-oxo-1,6-dihydro-9H-purin-9-yl)oxolan-2-yl]methyl} tetrahydrogen triphosphate
- Other names iniosine triphosphate

Identifiers
CAS Number	132-06-9
3D model (JSmol)	Interactive image
ChEBI	CHEBI:16039
ChEMBL	ChEMBL1233686
ChemSpider	8265
ECHA InfoCard	100.004.589
EC Number	205-046-7
KEGG	C00081
PubChem CID	135398643
UNII	212A76R77X
CompTox Dashboard (EPA)	DTXSID8074499
- InChI: Key: HAEJPQIATWHALX-KQYNXXCUSA-N
- SMILES: C1=NC(=O)C2=C(N1)N(C=N2)[C@H]3[C@@H]([C@@H]([C@H](O3)COP(=O)(O)OP(=O)(O)OP(=O)(O)O)O)O

Properties
Chemical formula	C_{10}H_{15}N_{4}O_{14}P_{3}
Molar mass	508.165 g·mol^{−1}
Solubility in water	903.5 mg/mL
- Except where otherwise noted, data are given for materials in their standard state (at 25 °C [77 °F], 100 kPa). Infobox references

Inosine triphosphate (ITP) is an intermediate in the purine metabolism pathway, seen in the synthesis of ATP and GTP. It comprises an inosine nucleotide containing three phosphate groups esterified to the sugar moiety.

ITP results from deamination of ATP. Incorporation of ITP into the DNA from the nucleotide pool can lead to DNA damage, mutagenesis and other harmful effects. ITP is processed by the enzyme inosine triphosphate pyrophosphatase (ITPA), which turns it into inosine monophosphate (IMP), to avoid incorporation into DNA.
