= Xanthosine monophosphate =

Names
- IUPAC name 5'-xanthylic acid
- Other names xanthine ribotide, XMP

Identifiers
CAS Number	523-98-8
3D model (JSmol)	Interactive image
ChEBI	CHEBI:15652
ChemSpider	66054
KEGG	C00655
MeSH	Xanthosine+monophosphate
PubChem CID	122280
UNII	Y29K672ETF
CompTox Dashboard (EPA)	DTXSID20966674
- InChI: InChI=1S/C10H13N4O9P/c15-5-3(1-22-24(19,20)21)23-9(6(5)16)14-2-11-4-7(14)12-10(18)13-8(4)17/h2-3,5-6,9,15-16H,1H2,(H2,19,20,21)(H2,12,13,17,18)/t3-,5-,6-,9-/m1/s1 Key: DCTLYFZHFGENCW-UUOKFMHZSA-N; InChI=1/C10H13N4O9P/c15-5-3(1-22-24(19,20)21)23-9(6(5)16)14-2-11-4-7(14)12-10(18)13-8(4)17/h2-3,5-6,9,15-16H,1H2,(H2,19,20,21)(H2,12,13,17,18)/t3-,5-,6-,9-/m1/s1 Key: DCTLYFZHFGENCW-UUOKFMHZBH
- SMILES: C1=NC2=C(N1[C@H]3[C@@H]([C@@H]([C@H](O3)COP(=O)(O)O)O)O)NC(=O)NC2=O

Properties
Chemical formula	C_{10}H_{13}N_{4}O_{9}P
Molar mass	364.206 g/mol
- Except where otherwise noted, data are given for materials in their standard state (at 25 °C [77 °F], 100 kPa). verify (what is ?) Infobox references

Xanthosine monophosphate (xanthylate) is an intermediate in purine metabolism. It is a ribonucleoside monophosphate. It is formed from IMP via the action of IMP dehydrogenase, and it forms GMP via the action of GMP synthase. Also, XMP can be released from XTP by enzyme deoxyribonucleoside triphosphate pyrophosphohydrolase containing (d)XTPase activity.

It is abbreviated XMP.

== See also ==
- Xanthosine
