= Xanthosine triphosphate =

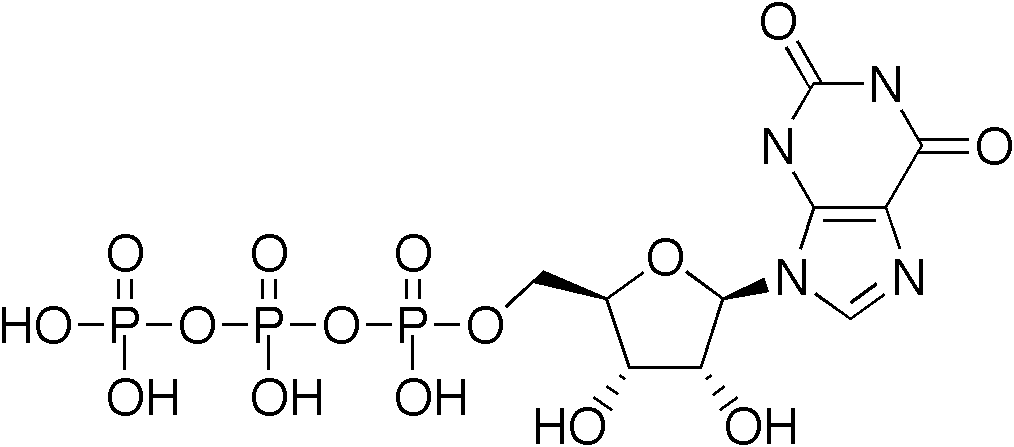

Names
- IUPAC name [(2R,3S,4R)-5-(2,6-dioxo-3H-purin-9-yl)-3,4-dihydroxy-2-tetrahydrofuranyl]methyl (hydroxy-phosphonooxyphosphoryl) hydrogen phosphate

Identifiers
CAS Number	6253-56-1
3D model (JSmol)	Interactive image
ChemSpider	19980202
PubChem CID	121887
UNII	AM28CL5N94
CompTox Dashboard (EPA)	DTXSID30978122
- InChI: InChI=1S/C10H12N4O6.3H3O4P/c15-1-3-5(16)6(17)9(20-3)14-2-11-4-7(14)12-10(19)13-8(4)18;3*1-5(2,3)4/h2-3,5-6,9,15-17H,1H2,(H2,12,13,18,19);3*(H3,1,2,3,4)/t3-,5-,6-,9-;;;/m1.../s1 Key: BKBQKVXTMZOVRH-CYCLDIHTSA-N; InChI=1/C10H12N4O6.3H3O4P/c15-1-3-5(16)6(17)9(20-3)14-2-11-4-7(14)12-10(19)13-8(4)18;3*1-5(2,3)4/h2-3,5-6,9,15-17H,1H2,(H2,12,13,18,19);3*(H3,1,2,3,4)/t3-,5-,6-,9-;;;/m1.../s1 Key: BKBQKVXTMZOVRH-CYCLDIHTBT
- SMILES: OP(O)(=O)O.OP(O)(=O)O.OP(O)(=O)O.O=C3Nc2c(ncn2[C@@H]1O[C@H](CO)[C@@H](O)[C@H]1O)C(=O)N3

Properties
Chemical formula	C_{10}H_{15}N_{4}O_{15}P_{3}
Molar mass	524.17 g/mol
- Except where otherwise noted, data are given for materials in their standard state (at 25 °C [77 °F], 100 kPa). verify (what is ?) Infobox references

Xanthosine 5'-triphosphate (XTP) is a nucleotide that is not produced by - and has no known function in - living cells. Uses of XTP are, in general, limited to experimental procedures on enzymes that bind other nucleotides. Deamination of purine bases can result in accumulation of such nucleotides as ITP, dITP, XTP, and dXTP.

== See also ==
- Xanthosine
- Xanthosine monophosphate
