= 7-Methylxanthine =

Chemical compound

Clinical data
- Other names: 7-MX; 7-Methylxanthin; Heteroxanthin; Heteroxanthine; NSC-7861

Identifiers
- IUPAC name: 7-methyl-3H-purine-2,6-dione
- CAS Number: 552-62-5
- PubChem CID: 68374
- ChemSpider: 61660
- UNII: E9M81NJM6G
- KEGG: C16353
- ChEBI: CHEBI:48991
- ChEMBL: ChEMBL321248
- CompTox Dashboard (EPA): DTXSID60203696
- ECHA InfoCard: 100.008.200

Chemical and physical data
- Formula: C_{6}H_{6}N_{4}O_{2}
- Molar mass: 166.140 g·mol^{−1}
- 3D model (JSmol): Interactive image
- SMILES: CN1C=NC2=C1C(=O)NC(=O)N2
- InChI: InChI=1S/C6H6N4O2/c1-10-2-7-4-3(10)5(11)9-6(12)8-4/h2H,1H3,(H2,8,9,11,12); Key:PFWLFWPASULGAN-UHFFFAOYSA-N

7-Methylxanthine (7-MX), also known as heteroxanthine, is an active metabolite of caffeine (1,3,7-trimethylxanthine) and theobromine (3,7-dimethylxanthine). It is a non-selective antagonist of the adenosine receptors. The compound may slow the progression of myopia (nearsightedness). It is under investigation for this purpose in children with myopia.

It is shown that systemic treatment with 7-MX appears to be efficient in retarding axial elongation and myopia progression among myopic children. The treatment is safe and without side effects, and may be continued until 18–20 years of age, when age-related cross-linking of collagen prevents further elongation of the eye. Additionally, further studies show that oral intake of 7-MX was associated with reduced myopia progression and reduced axial elongation in this sample of myopic children from Denmark. Randomized controlled trials are needed to determine whether the association is causal.
