= Xanthosine =

Names
- IUPAC name Xanthosine
- Systematic IUPAC name 9-[(2R,3R,4S,5R)-3,4-Dihydroxy-5-(hydroxymethyl)oxolan-2-yl]-3,9-dihydro-1H-purine-2,6-dione
- Other names Xanthine riboside; 9-β-D-Ribofuranosylxanthine

Identifiers
CAS Number	146-80-5
3D model (JSmol)	Interactive image; Interactive image
ChEMBL	ChEMBL402439
ChemSpider	58484
ECHA InfoCard	100.005.164
PubChem CID	64959
UNII	BM66HT53C3
CompTox Dashboard (EPA)	DTXSID90861829
- InChI: InChI=1S/C10H12N4O6/c15-1-3-5(16)6(17)9(20-3)14-2-11-4-7(14)12-10(19)13-8(4)18/h2-3,5-6,9,15-17H,1H2,(H2,12,13,18,19)/t3-,5-,6-,9-/m1/s1 Key: UBORTCNDUKBEOP-UUOKFMHZSA-N
- SMILES: C1=NC2=C(N1[C@H]3[C@@H]([C@@H]([C@H](O3)CO)O)O)NC(=O)NC2=O; O=C3Nc1c(ncn1[C@@H]2O[C@@H]([C@@H](O)[C@H]2O)CO)C(=O)N3

Properties
Chemical formula	C_{10}H_{12}N_{4}O_{6}
Molar mass	284.228 g·mol^{−1}
Melting point	Decomposes when heated
Solubility in water	Sparingly soluble in cold water; freely soluble in hot water
- Except where otherwise noted, data are given for materials in their standard state (at 25 °C [77 °F], 100 kPa). Infobox references

Xanthosine is a nucleoside derived from xanthine and ribose. It is the biosynthetic precursor to 7-methylxanthosine by the action of 7-methylxanthosine synthase. 7-Methylxanthosine in turn is the precursor to theobromine (active alkaloid in chocolate), which in turn is the precursor to caffeine, the alkaloid in coffee and tea.

== See also ==
- Inosine
- Xanthosine monophosphate
- Xanthosine diphosphate
- Xanthosine triphosphate
