= Yume Wo Katare =

Ramen shop in Boston

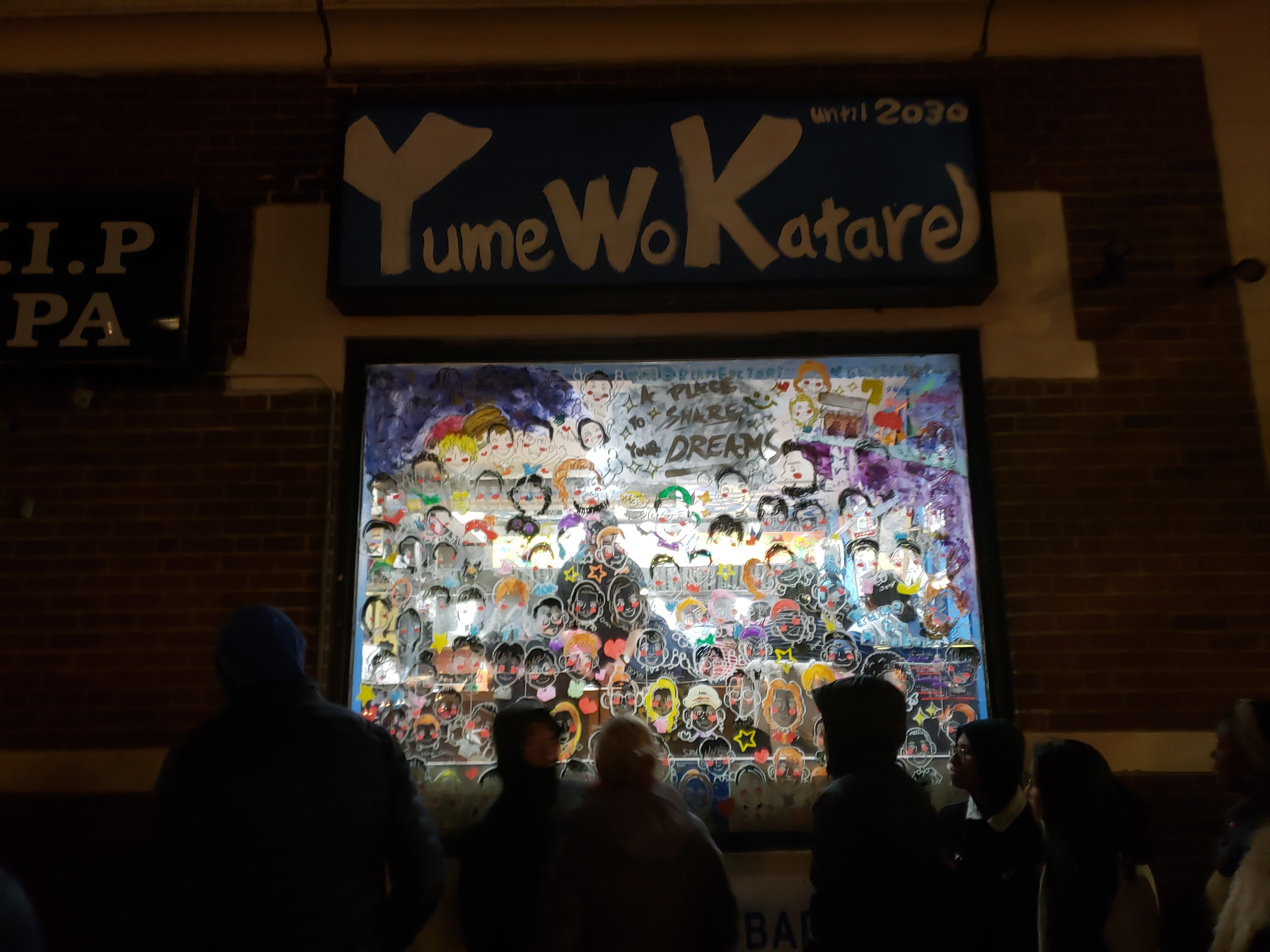
- Interactive map of Yume Wo Katare

Restaurant information
- Established: 2012
- Owner: Tsuyoshi Nishioka
- Food type: Ramen
- Dress code: Casual
- Location: 1923 Massachusetts Avenue, Cambridge, Massachusetts, 02140, United States
- Coordinates: 42.3894°N 71.1197°W

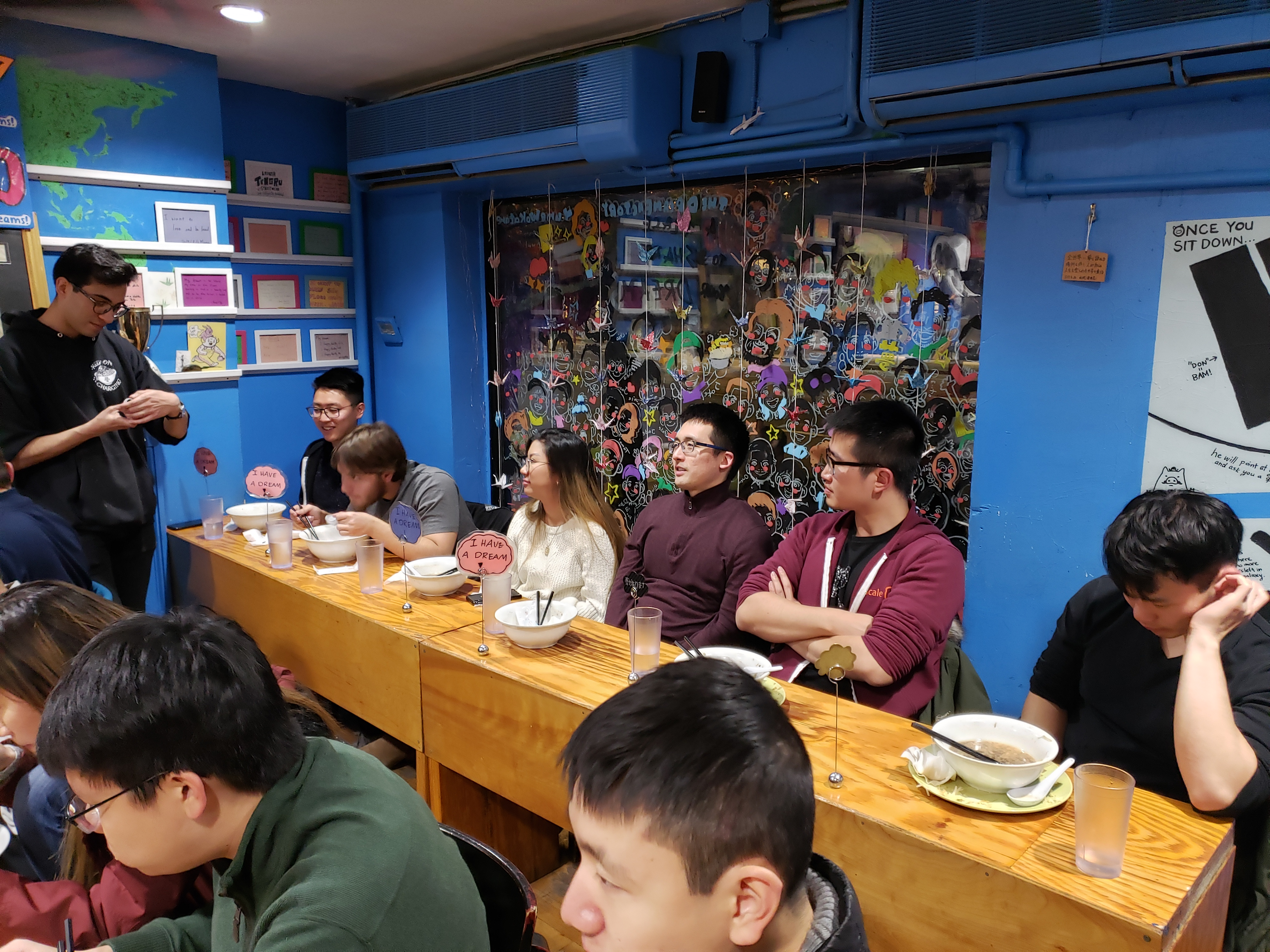
Diners at Yume Wo Katare sharing their dreams after finishing their meal

Yume Wo Katare (Japanese: 夢を語れ, lit. 'Speak Your Dreams') is a ramen shop located at 1923 Massachusetts Avenue in the Porter Square neighborhood of Cambridge, Massachusetts. It specializes in Yume-style ramen. The restaurant is known for its service concept: diners are encouraged to share their dreams and aspirations to their fellow diners after finishing their meal.

== History ==
Yume Wo Katare was opened by Tsuyoshi Nishioka in November 2012. He had previously worked in ramen restaurants in Kyoto to support his career as a comedian, and later owned and ran five branches in Kyoto, Osaka and Kobe which he later sold to their managers before relocating to the United States in 2011. Nishioka initially considered setting up shop in Hawaii and New York City, but was disappointed by the disproportionately large number of Japanese Americans in both locations. He wanted to set up a restaurant in a location with a large student population. He flew into Boston the day after another guest at his New York hotel suggested he open his restaurant there, and decided to set up shop in Porter Square. The restaurant closed over the summer of 2013, during which it was redecorated.

For three non-consecutive days in 2014, Jorgen "Walker" Peterson, a former chemist who worked as the restaurant's manager, launched a vegan version of the ramen recipe as a pop-up restaurant which operated in the Yume Wo Katare space during lunch hours, at a time when the restaurant is closed.

Nishioka returned to Japan in 2018, where he has since opened up outposts of Yume Wo Katare in Beppu, where he currently lives, as well as in Okinawa, training around 50 apprentices how to create Jiro-style ramen with the goal of opening dream-centric ramen shops in all 47 Japanese prefectures.

== Concept ==
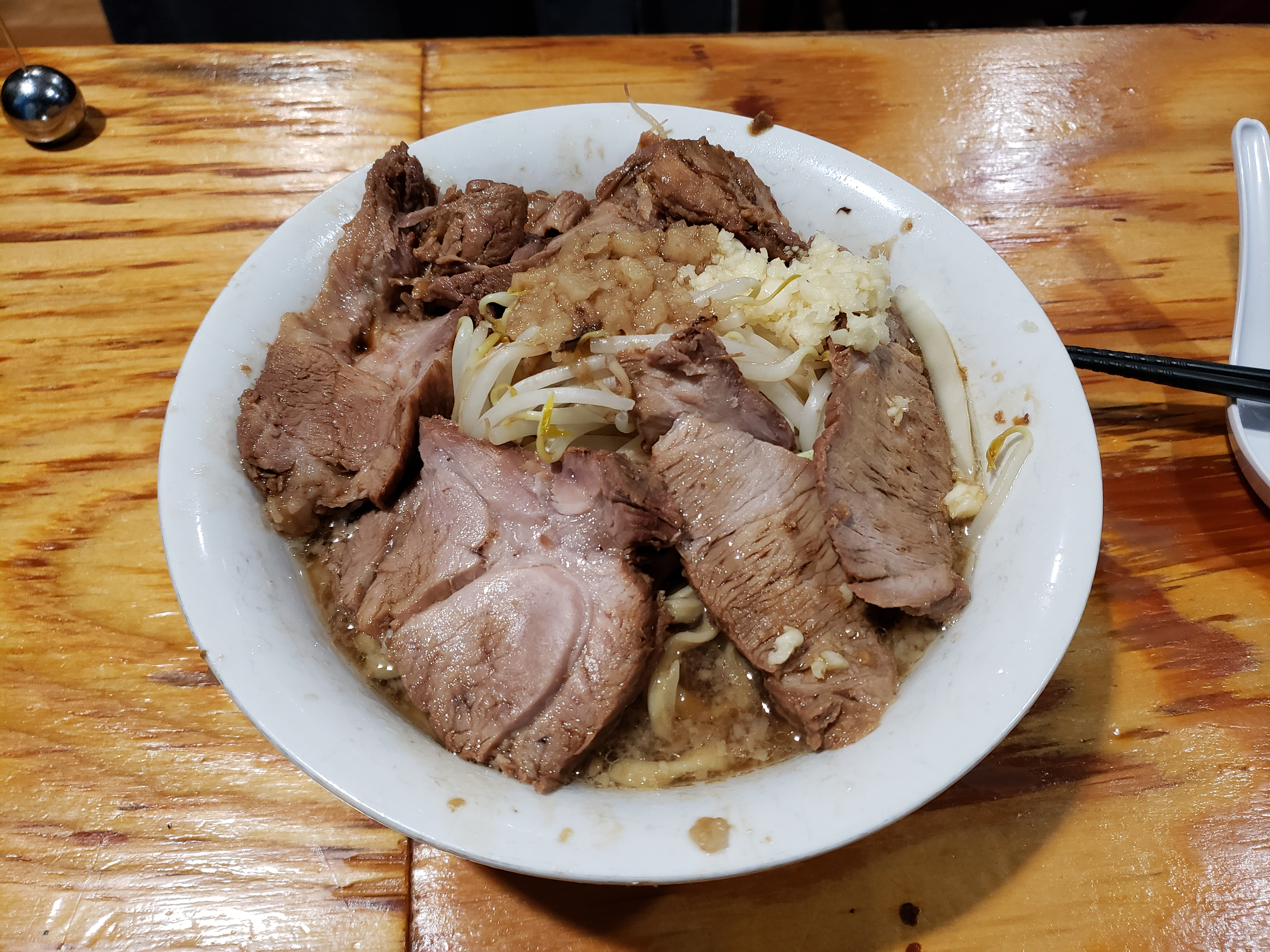
A bowl of Yume Wo Katare ramen.

Yume Wo Katare has been described as not just being a restaurant, but a "dream factory" and a food-centered aspirational community. Nishioka was deeply affected by the suicide of a partner in the comedy troupe he once performed with in Japan, and he has since made it his life's mission to help people achieve their dreams. To that end, the restaurant offers regular "dream workshops" in addition to its culinary offerings, particularly targeting Japanese students in Cambridge to help them figure out their own life dreams and goals.

The restaurant only offers one dish: a bowl of ramen either in regular or “extra pork” (buta) sizes which vary based on the amount of chāshū, served alongside cabbage and bean sprouts, as well as options for extra fat and garlic. The ramen base is made from a tonkotsu broth that cooks for 14 hours, giving it a rich flavor, combined with a shōyu broth and hand-cut noodles. The dish itself has been described by The Boston Globe as being "porky, garlicky, hefty, [and] intense", with prospective diners waiting in line for it every day, sometimes for over an hour. There is a vegetarian option as well.

The restaurant is notable for its interactive and novel yet highly regimented dining experience through its classroom-like seating arrangement, which allows for only 18 diners at one time. Upon finishing their meal, guests are encouraged by staff to share their aspirations with the other diners in the room. Afterwards, based on how much of the dish is left in their bowl, guests are graded by restaurant staff either with grades such as "perfect", "good job", "almost" or "next time", with the goal of the post-dining grading system being to challenge people to go beyond what they believe they are capable of as well as discourage wasteful consumption.
