= Ichiran =

Japanese restaurant chain

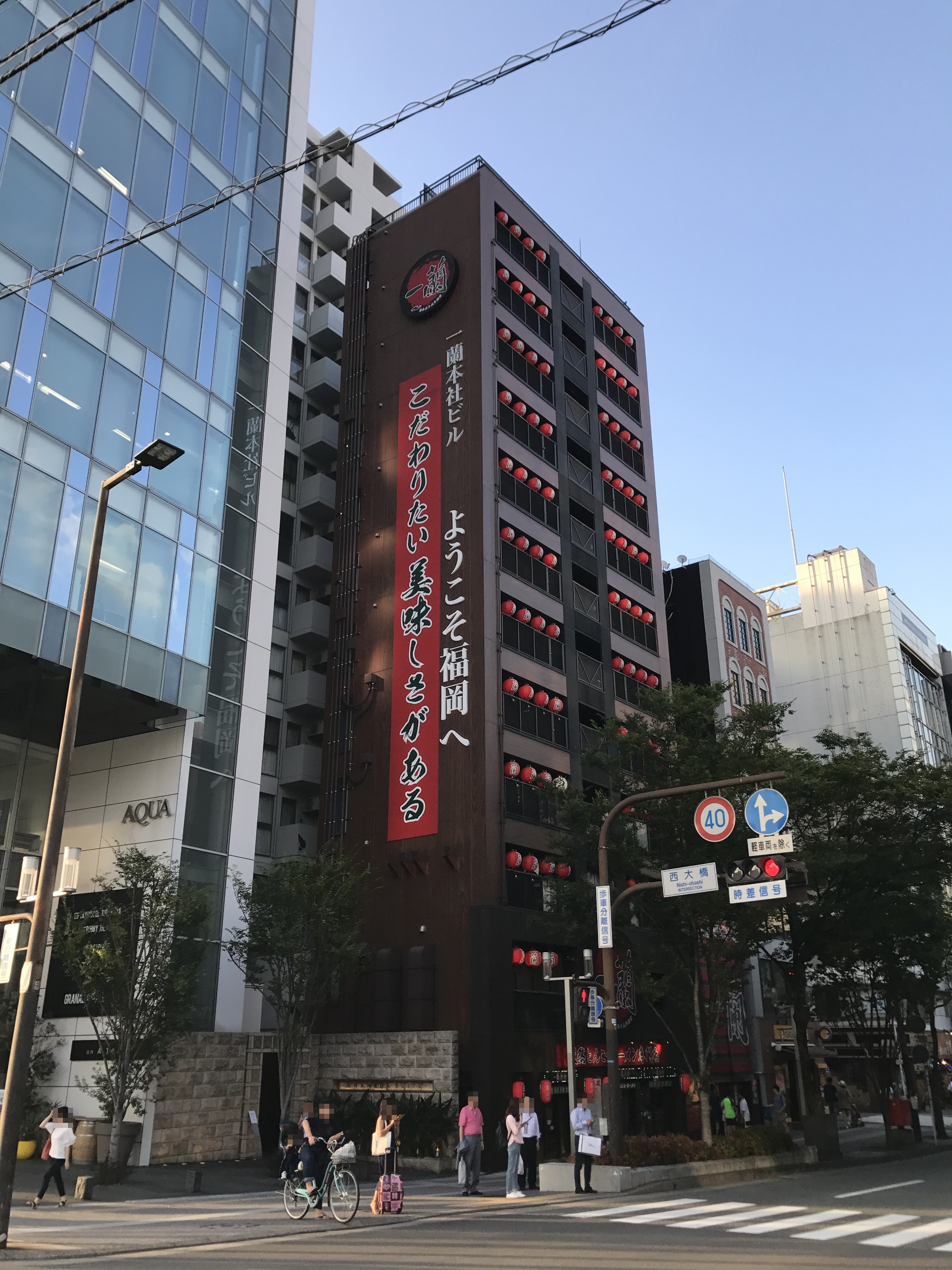
- Headquarters in Fukuoka
- Type: Private
- Industry: Restaurants
- Founded: Fukuoka, Fukuoka Prefecture, Japan in May 1993
- Headquarters: Fukuoka, Japan
- Area served: Japan, Hong Kong, Taiwan, United States
- Products: Ramen
- Website: Official website

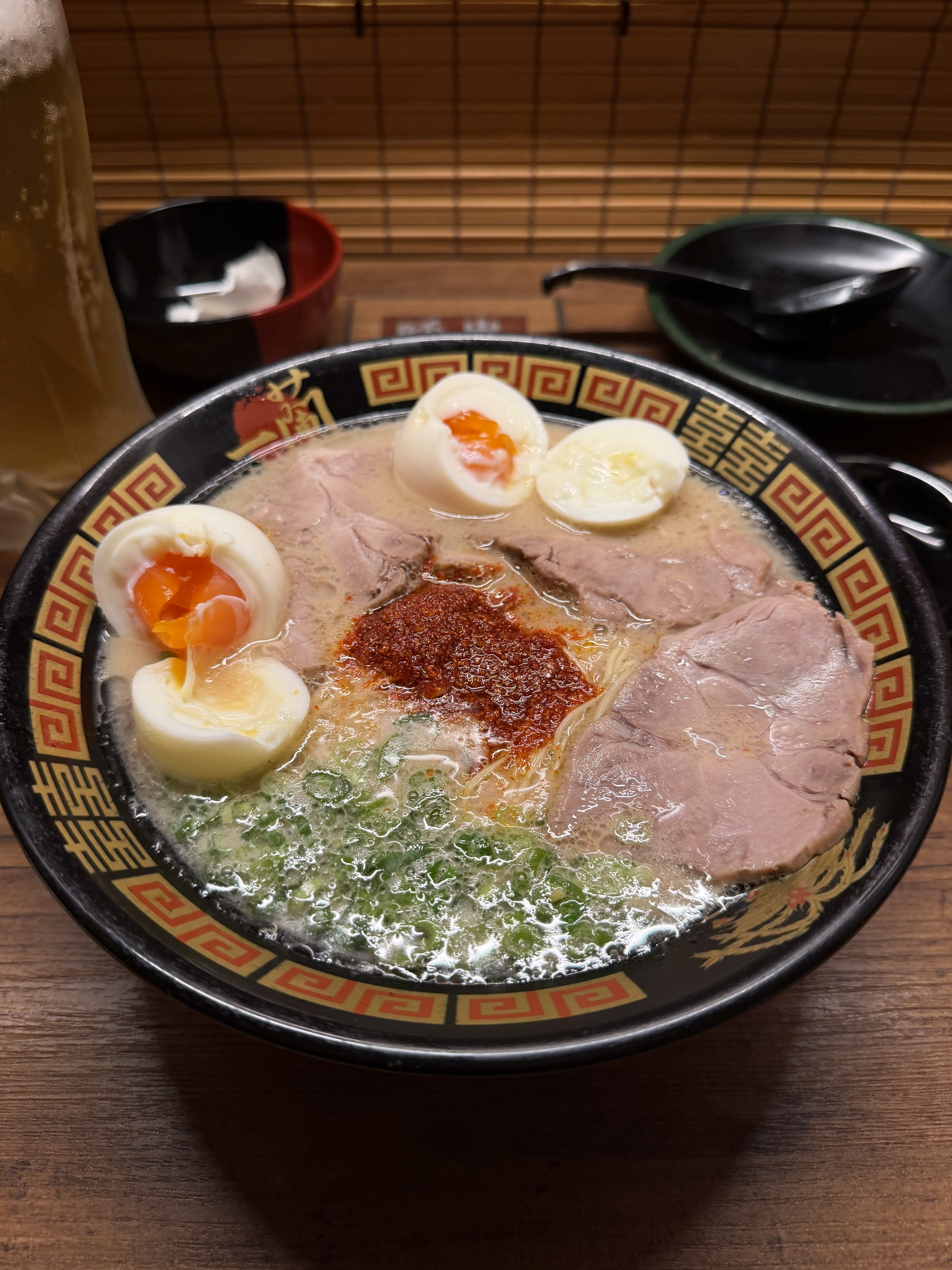
A bowl of tonkotsu ramen at Ichiran in Tokyo in July 2026

Ichiran Ramen (一蘭, Ichiran) is a Japanese ramen food-service business specializing in tonkotsu ramen. The chain restaurant began in Fukuoka in 1960 as a ramen stall named "Futaba Ramen" (屋台双葉ラーメン). It was later renamed "Ichiran"（一蘭 "one orchid"）in 1966. After three decades of serving ramen from a single location, under the leadership of CEO Manabu Yoshitomi it opened its first concept store in 1993, which became the blueprint for all future Ichiran ramen shop locations.

== Concept ==
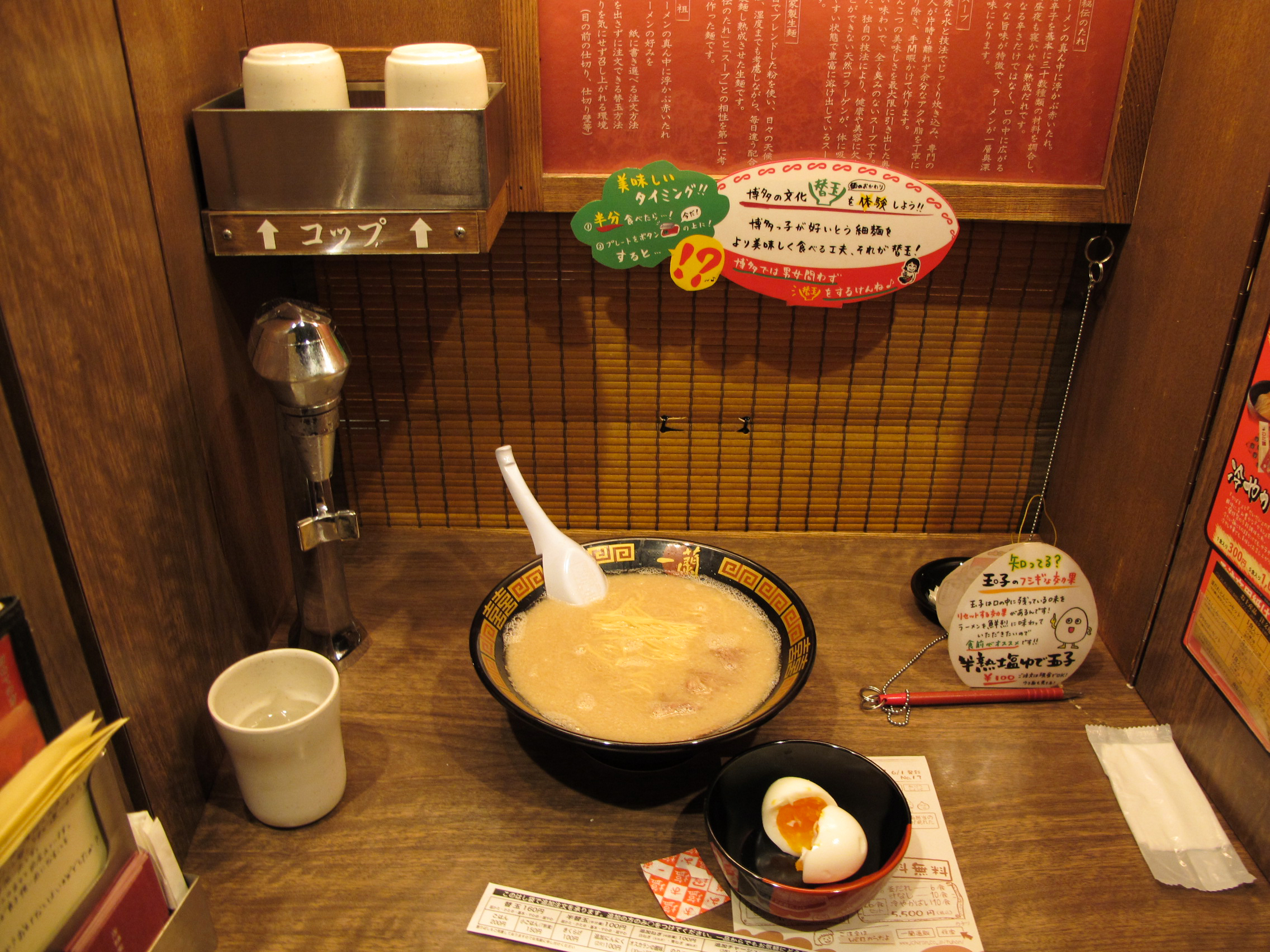
The accoutrements of the solo dining experience at Ichiran, including self-service water. Ichiran ramen is served to guests in individual booths behind a curtain to allow the diner to focus on the ramen.

Ichiran ramen is distinctively unique amidst most other ramen restaurants for offering a so-called "solo dining" experience. Customers who dine at Ichiran are seated in a solo booth and, once ready, the ramen is served from behind a curtain and the curtain is closed to allow the diner to focus on the ramen itself. Arrangements are made so that customers can order refills or extras without having to speak to a waiter, by filling in their extra order on a paper form and pressing a button, and each booth is equipped with its own tap for self-service water. Customers who dine in group can be seated side by side, however the layout of the booths makes it close to a solo experience regardless.

Ichiran also distinguishes itself by letting the customers customise the ramen to their liking via a paper form. Although tonkotsu (pork bone) broth is used as the base for all ramen, customers are asked to customise their ramen by filling in a form prior to being seated. The form asks for the customer's preference for various criteria: intensity of the broth, richness (the amount of fat), amount of garlic, the presence of green and/or white onions, the presence of pork slices, the amount of spice and the consistency of the noodles. There is no change in price no matter the options selected, except for getting over one clove of garlic and over a certain threshold of spice. After buying a meal ticket from a vending machine and filling in the form, the customer is then seated at a booth and is invited to place the meal ticket and the form on the table. A restaurant employee will take them and close the curtain; once the food is ready, it will be served from behind the curtain.

At most of its locations, Ichiran ramen also offers ready-made kits for customers to make their signature ramen at home.

Ichiran also has special "No Pork" branches in Japan, targeted to customers who cannot eat pork. The branches serve their ramen using a chicken-based broth and dashi that does not use alcohol-based soy sauce or mirin. Despite having pork-free and alcohol-free ingredients, the ramen is not halal.

== Locations ==
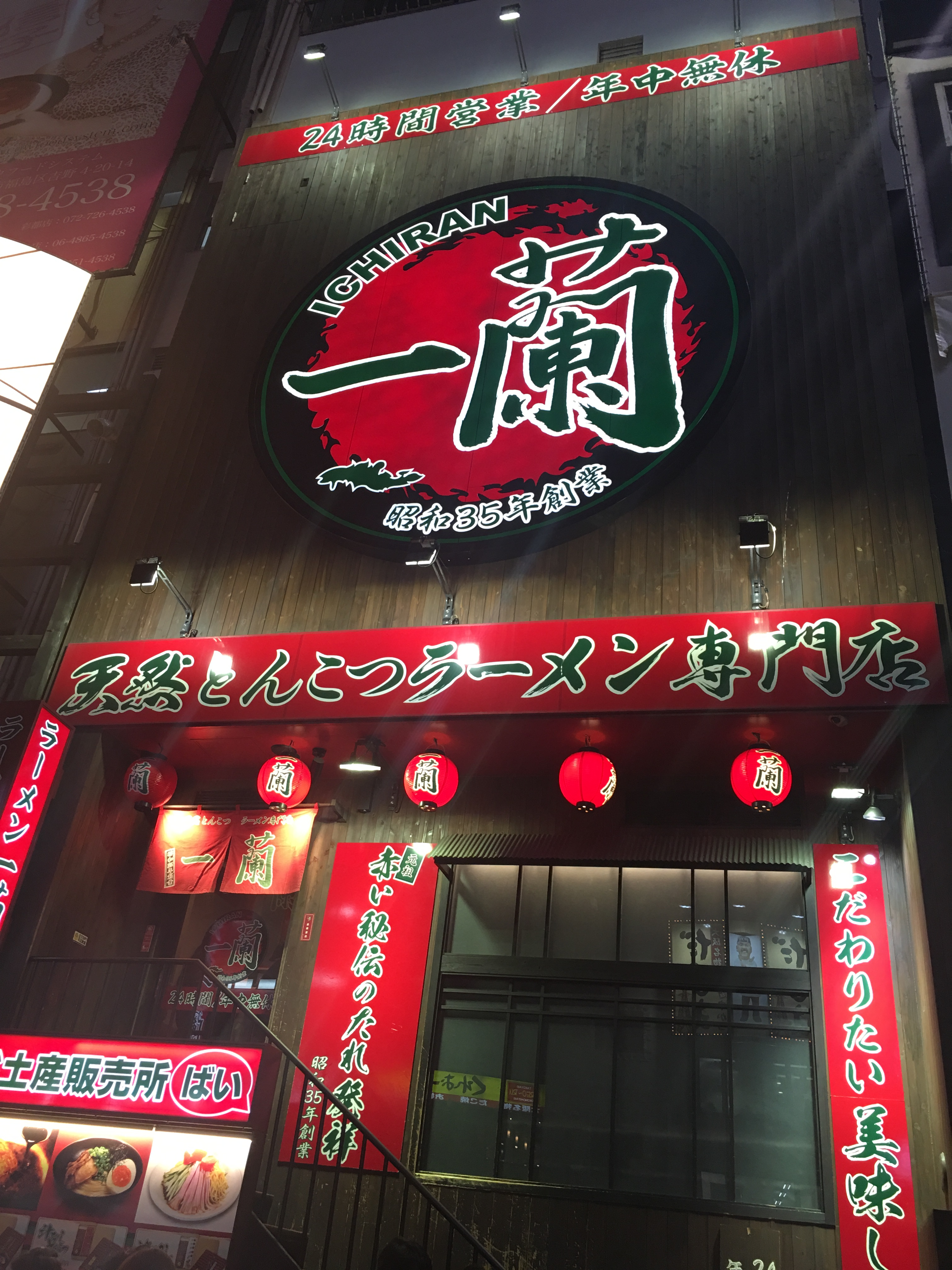
This Ichiran restaurant in Dōtonbori was open 24hrs

In November 2016, Ichiran USA opened a noodle factory and restaurant in the Bushwick neighborhood of Brooklyn in New York City. It imports its key components, broth and spicy red sauce, from Japan as of 2016. After trying to open in New York for 10 years, it abandoned an earlier plan of opening a restaurant in Manhattan due to regulations and logistics challenges.

By 2017 Ichiran had expanded across Japan to more than 65 locations. Outside of Japan, Ichiran has restaurants in Hong Kong, Taipei, Taichung, and Brooklyn, New York. The New York restaurant has been subject to criticism, though Ichiran's director of operations Hana Isoda argues that the prices are not far from New York City's other top ramen restaurants. The Brooklyn location has both tables and booths. In 2017, a location was planned for opening in London, England via a crowdfunding campaign, however the campaign ultimately failed and the project was seemingly cancelled. A Midtown, Manhattan location based on its solo dining concept opened in 2018 on West 31st Street, between Sixth and Seventh avenues as well as a Times Square location that opened in 2019 located on West 49th Street also between Sixth and Seventh avenues. Ichiran planned to open at least three new U.S. locations by 2020.

The popular 24 hour Dōtonbori main location suffered a major fire on 18 August 2025, and has closed pending investigation. The location has previously been cited for working foreign students longer than the 28-hour week their visa allowed.

== See also ==
- Ramen shop
