= Ramen shop =

Type of Japanese noodle shop

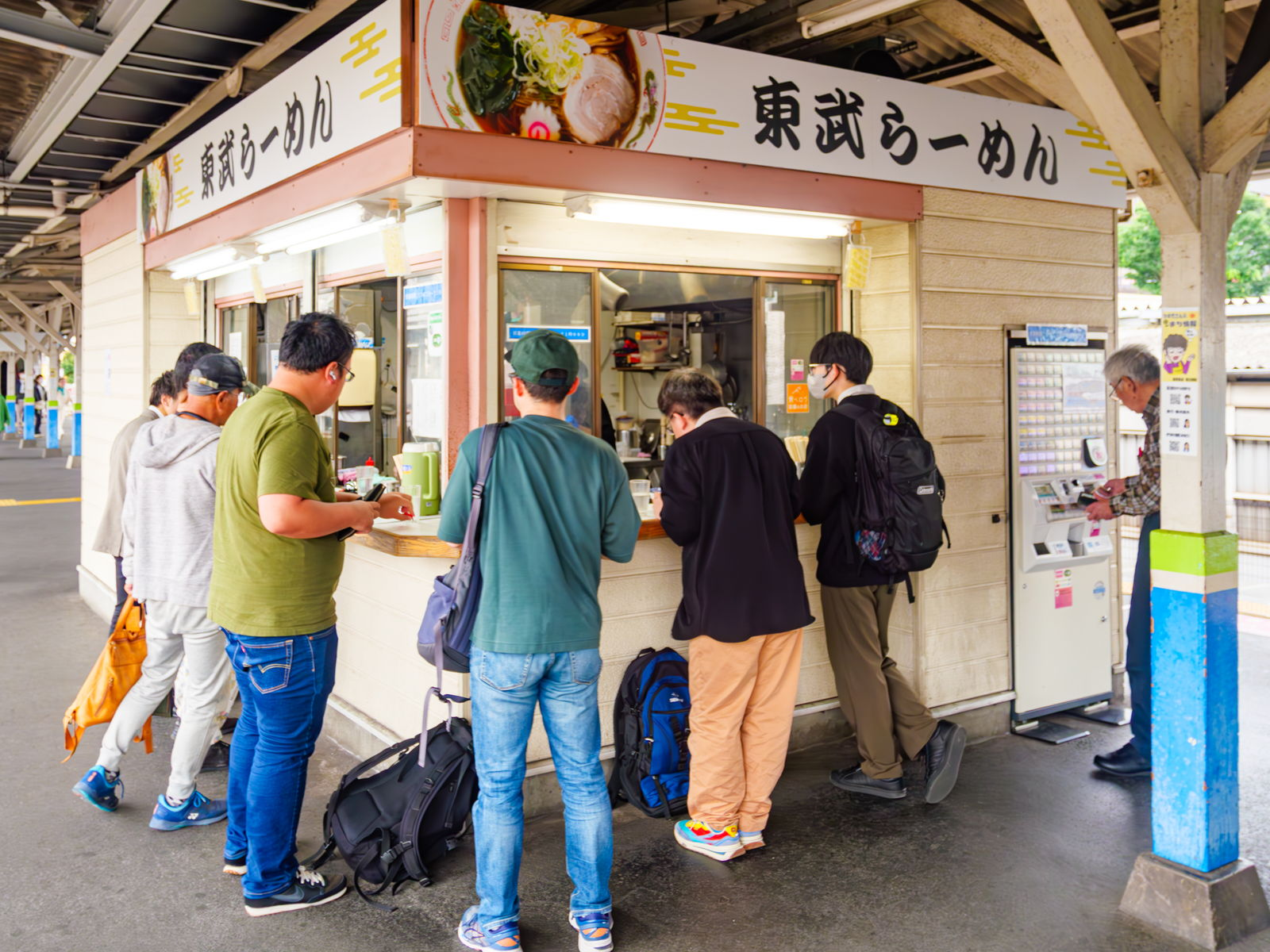
The ubiquitous train station ramen shop is a common sight.

A ramen shop is a restaurant that specializes in ramen dishes, the wheat-flour Japanese noodles in broth. In Japan, ramen shops are very common and popular, and are sometimes referred to as ramen-ya (ラーメン屋) or ramen-ten (ラーメン店). Some ramen shops operate in short-order style, while others provide patrons with sit-down service. Over 10,000 ramen shops exist in Japan, and the dish has gained popularity around the world.

== Overview ==
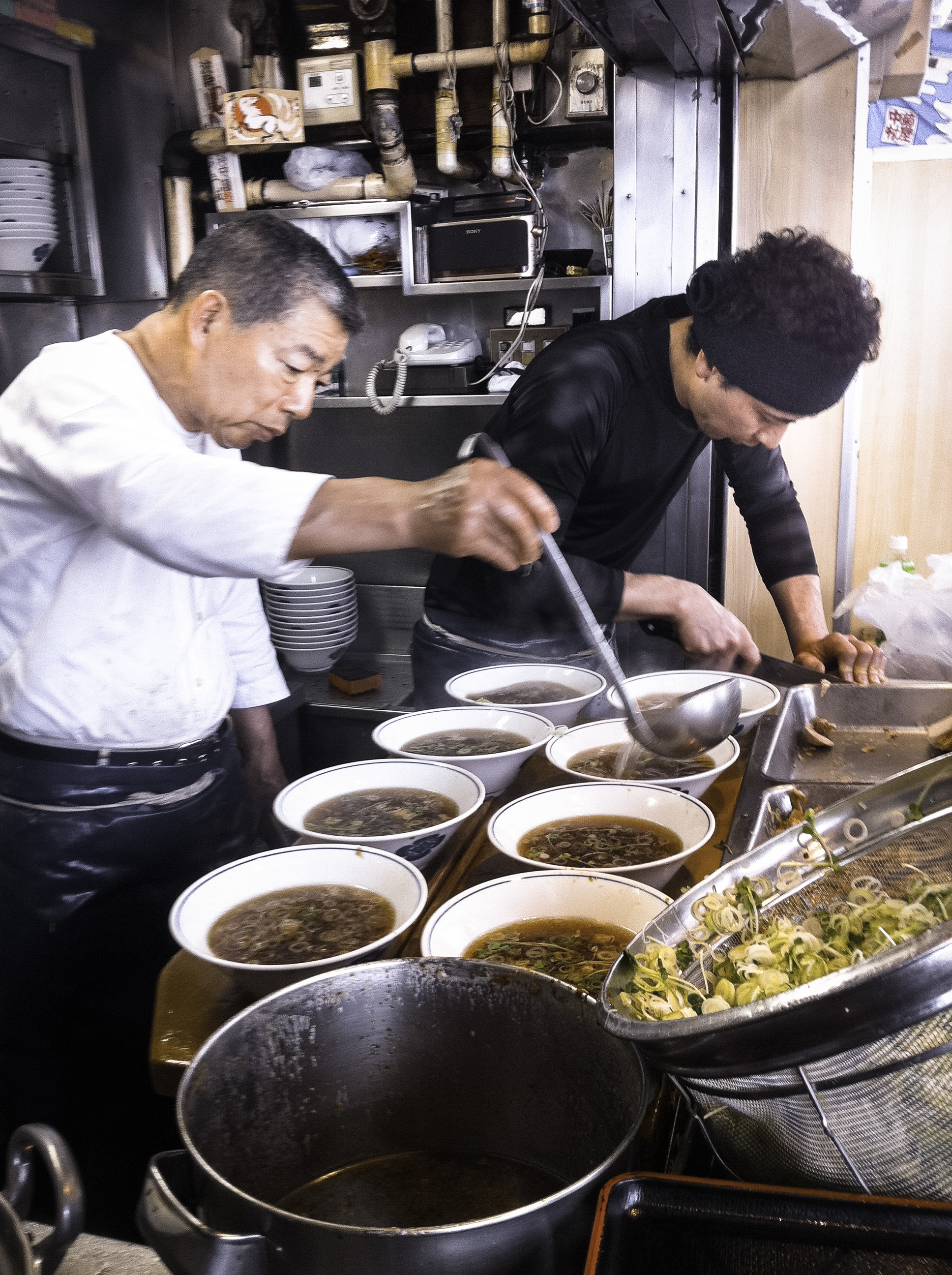
Chefs preparing ramen dishes at a ramen shop in Tokyo

A ramen shop typically specializes in ramen dishes, and may provide other foods such as gyōza. In Japan, ramen shops are sometimes referred to as ramen-ya or ramen-ten. Some ramen shops prepare all of their foods in-house "from scratch", including the soups, broths and ramen noodles, while others use prepackaged prepared noodles and other prepared ingredients. As of 2016, over 10,000 ramen shops exist in Japan.

Ramen dishes are very popular in Japan and are a significant part of Japanese cuisine, and ramen shops are very common and popular throughout the country. In Japan, television shows devoted to ramen shops, their fare, finding the best shops, and local specialties are popular. In the 1990s in Japan, corporate restructuring led to increased employment layoffs and cuts, and during this time articles were published in various magazines about starting up a ramen shop as a means to generate income and become a self-employed entrepreneur in attempts to offset the job layoffs and cuts.

Japanese ramen shops specialize in ramen dishes and exist throughout Japan. (Note: "Ramen is served in ramen-ya — shops that prepare only that dish... Customers stand in line in front of renowned ramen-ya, waiting for their turn to go inside.") Many ramen restaurants have limited seating, and some only have a bar with stools for patrons to eat at. At some ramen establishments, patrons place their order and remit payment at a ticket machine located in front of the shop, and then wait in line for their food. When a seat becomes available, patrons give the server their ticket and then wait for their food. This system can serve to keep the line moving in an expedient manner. Other ramen shops provide sit-down service whereby patrons are provided with a menu and order fare from a server.

In the United States, ramen rapidly gained popularity in the 2000s, led by Momofuku and Ippudo's restaurants in New York. Many restaurants are supplied by Sun Noodle factories.

== Notable ramen shops ==
The following is a list of notable ramen shops and restaurants.

- Ajisen Ramen – a Japanese restaurant chain of fast food restaurants selling Japanese ramen dishes, it has over 700 stores
- Boxer Ramen – a ramen restaurant chain based in Portland, Oregon, U.S.
- Ichiran is a Japanese restaurant chain that originated and is based in Fukuoka. The chain specifically specializes upon tonkotsu ramen.
- Ippudo – a Japanese ramen restaurant chain that is well known for its tonkotsu ramen, it has been described as "the most famous tonkotsu ramen shop in the country".
- Ivan Ramen – a ramen restaurant with two locations in New York City
- Jinya Ramen Bar – a restaurant chain based in Los Angeles, California
- Muteppou – a Japanese ramen noodle restaurant chain
- Ramen Danbo – a Japanese ramen restaurant chain specializing in Fukuoka-style ramen
- Ramen Jiro – a Japanese ramen restaurant chain
- Ramen Street – an area in the underground mall of the Tokyo Station railway station's Yaesu side that has eight restaurants specializing in ramen dishes.
- Tenkaippin – a Japanese restaurant chain specializing in ramen noodles
- Yume Wo Katare – a ramen shop in Cambridge, Massachusetts, where diners are encouraged to share their dreams and aspirations to their fellow diners after finishing their meal

== Gallery ==
Ramen shops

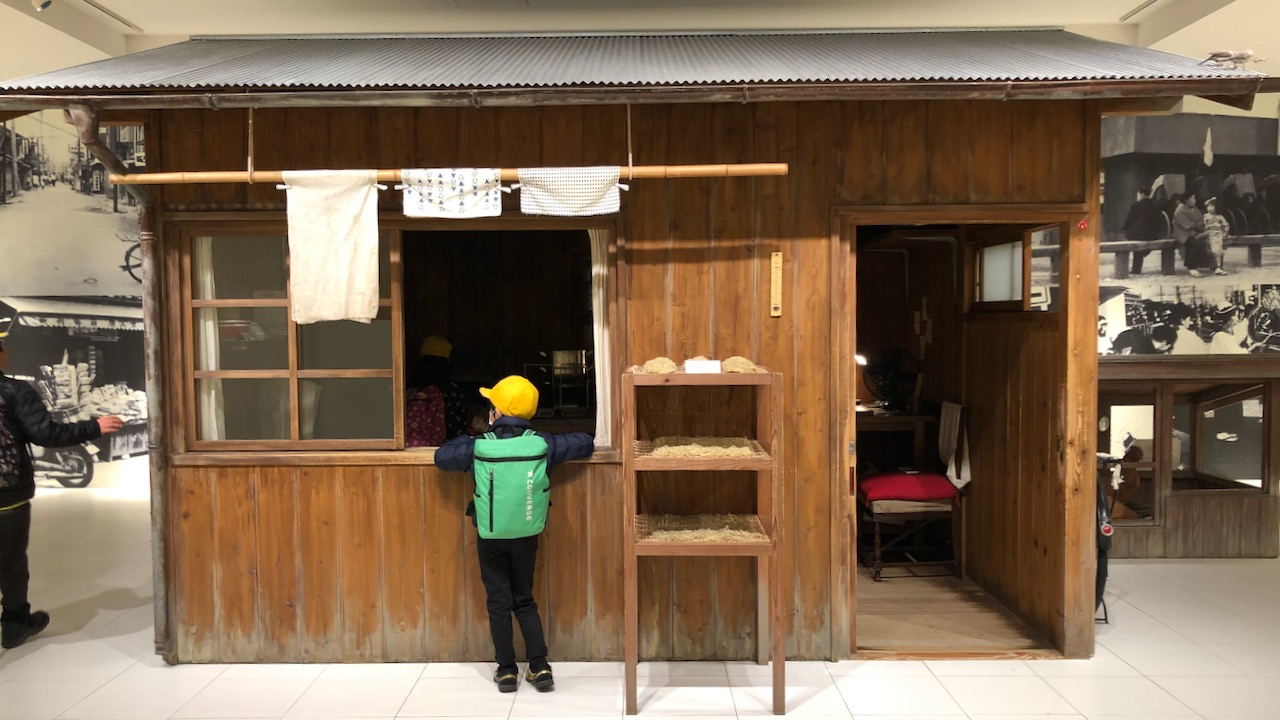
A recreation of Momofuku Ando's first shop at the CupNoodles Museum Yokohama

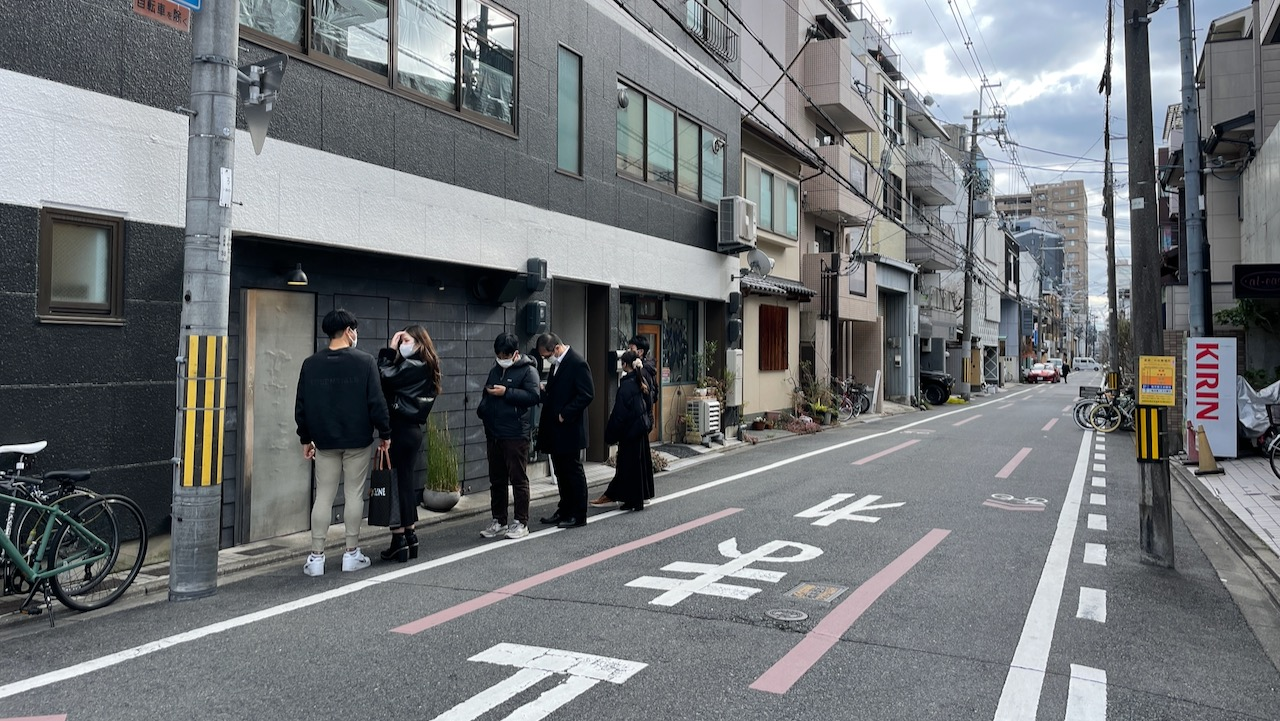
Some of the best ramen shops have minimal signage and rely on word of mouth advertising

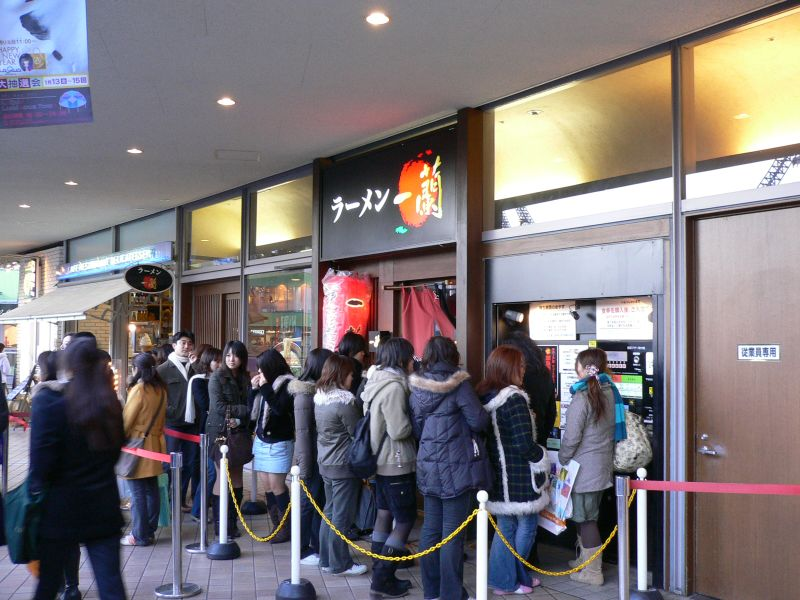
Customers in line at a ramen shop at Tokyo Dome City

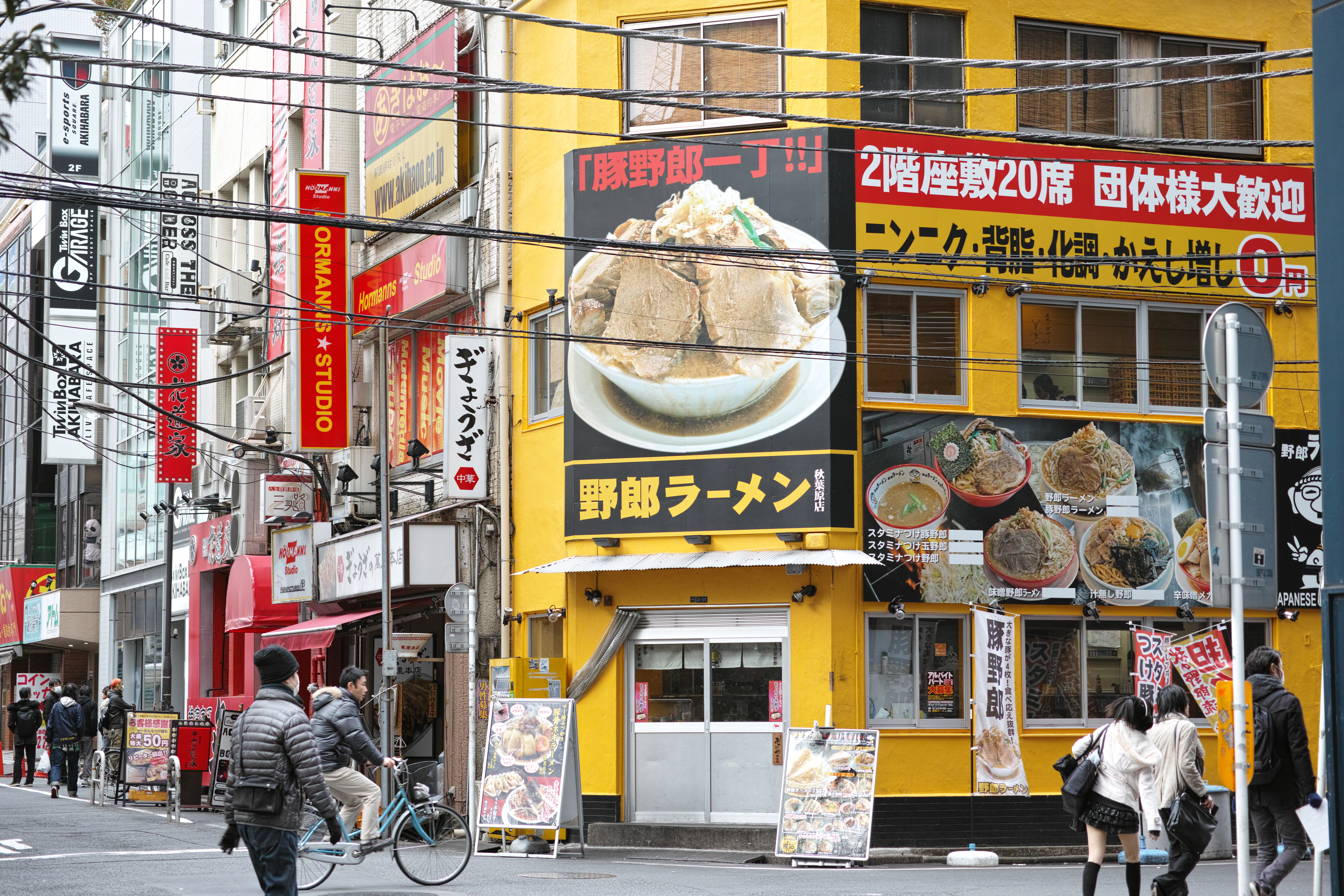
A ramen shop in Akihabara

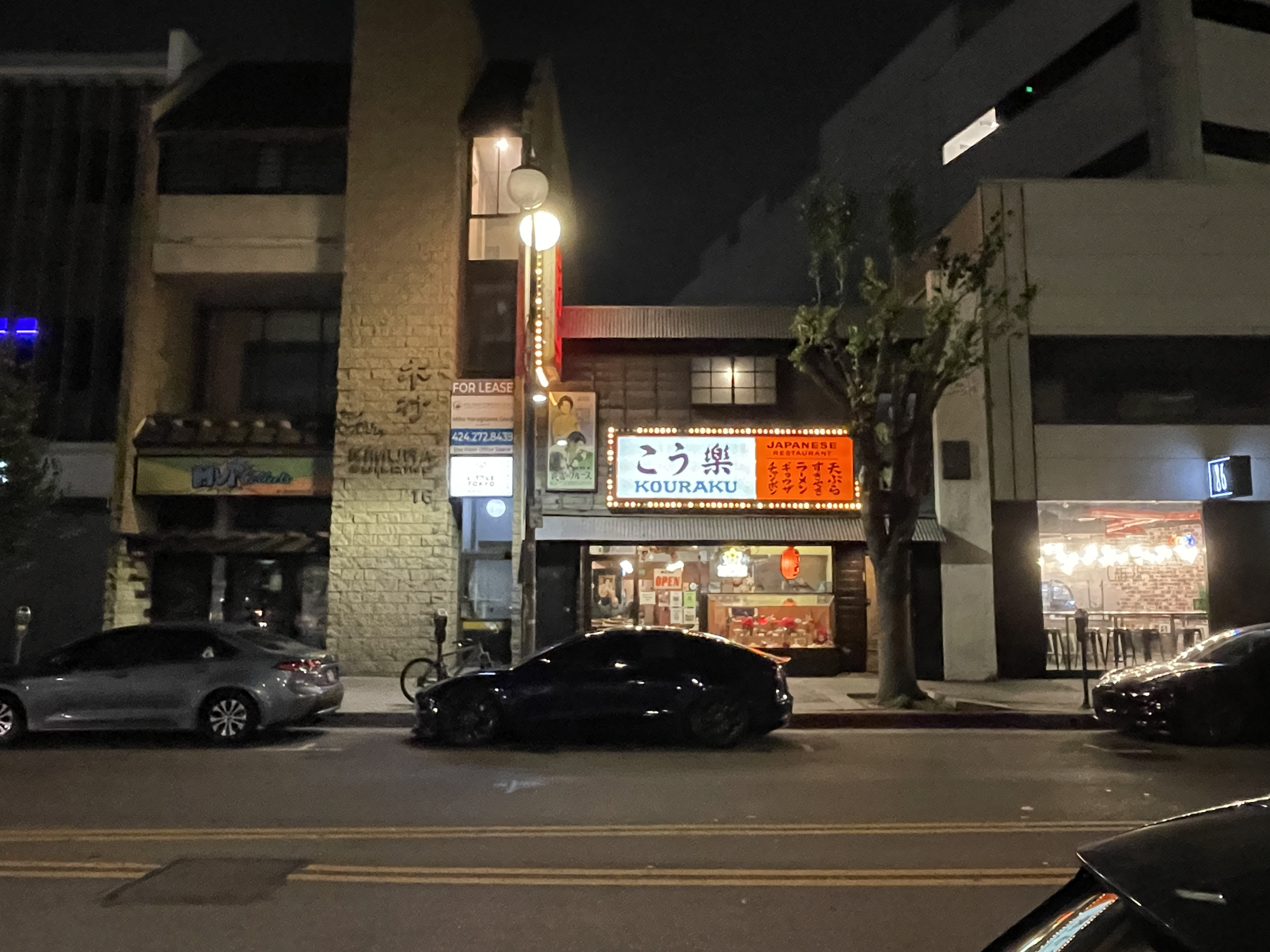
Kouraku in Los Angeles has been recognized as the oldest ramen shop in America, opened in 1976

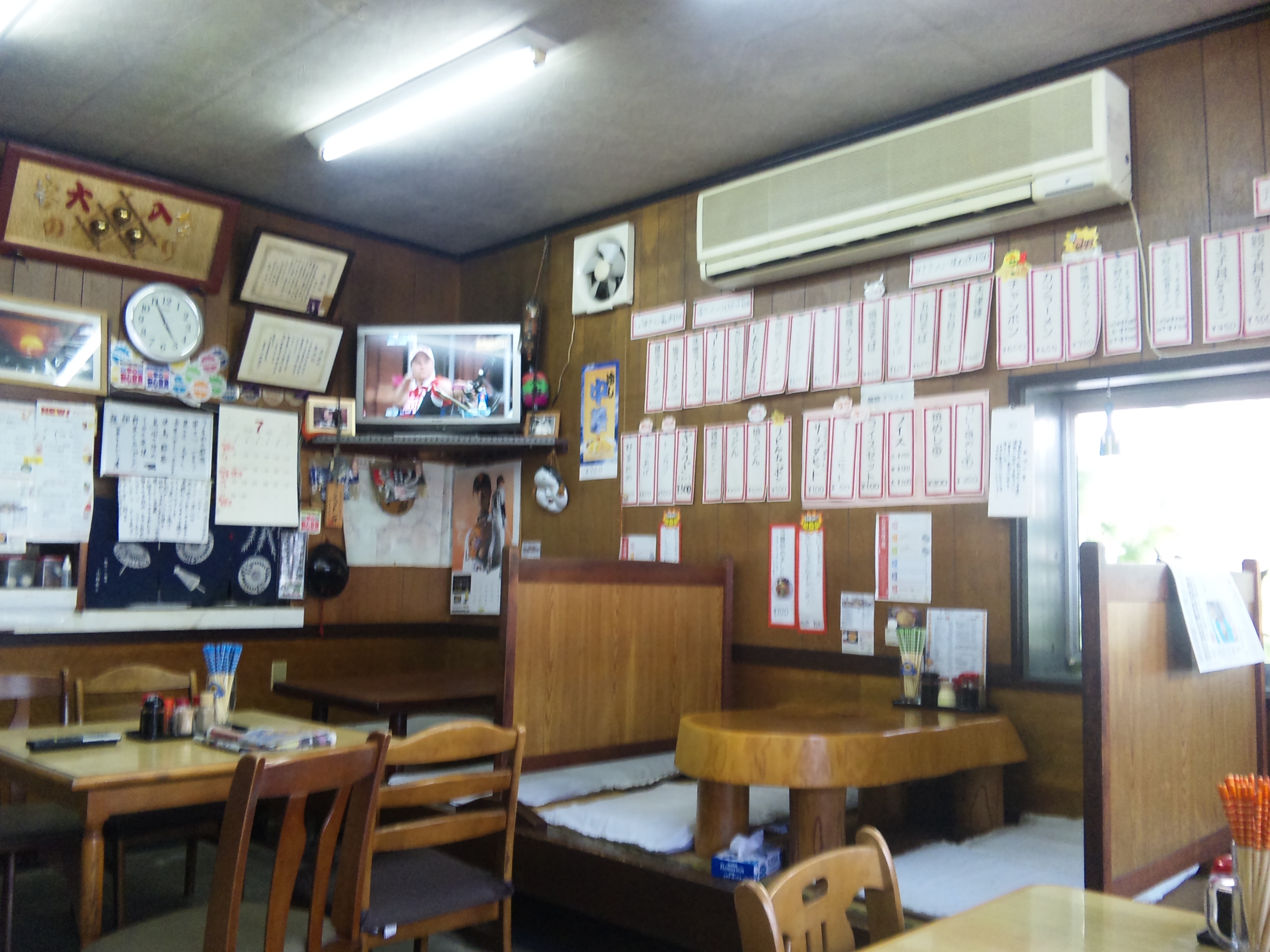
The no-nonsense interior of a typical ramen shop
Ramen shop dishes

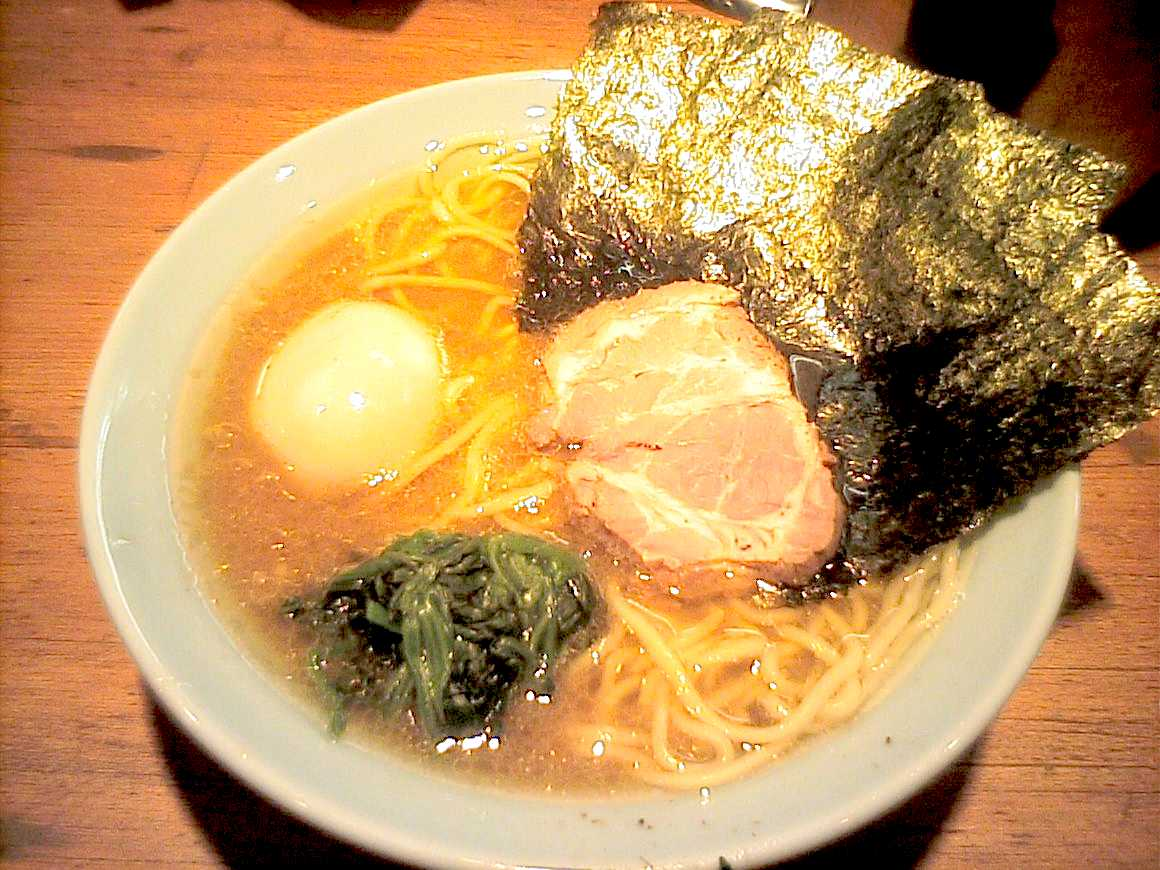
Ramen can be ordered on its own

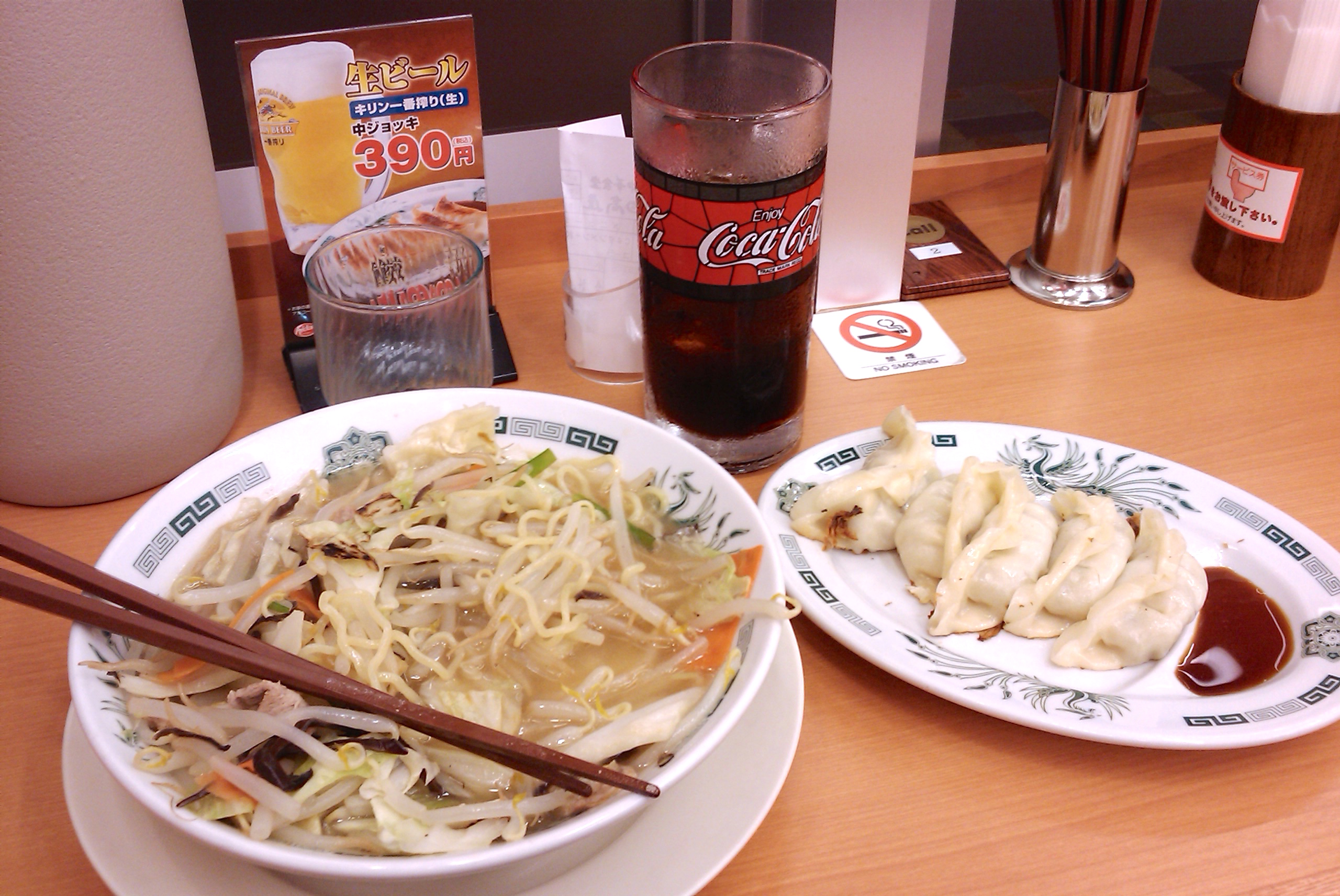
Many ramen shops also offer gyōza

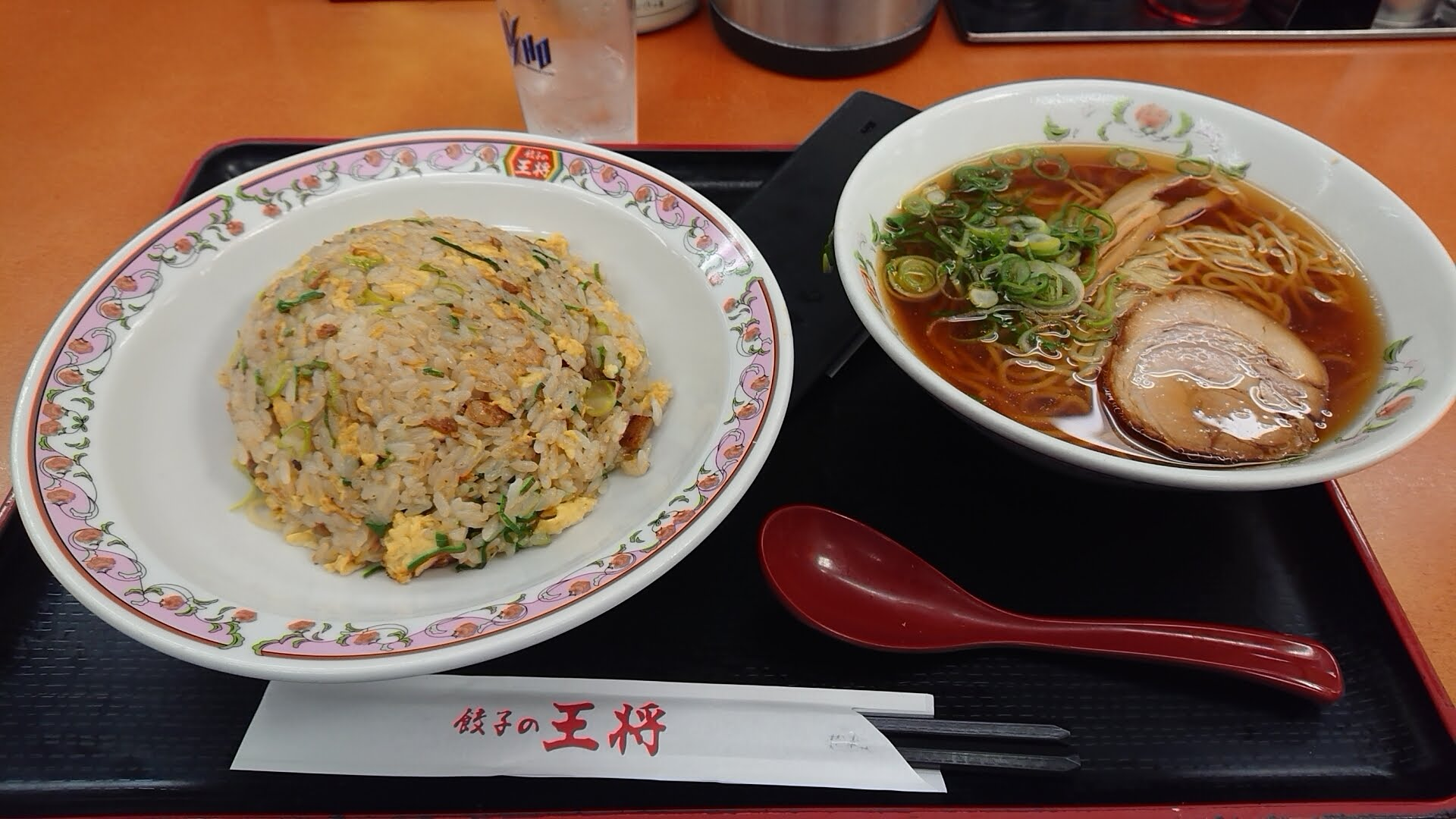
As well as Fried rice

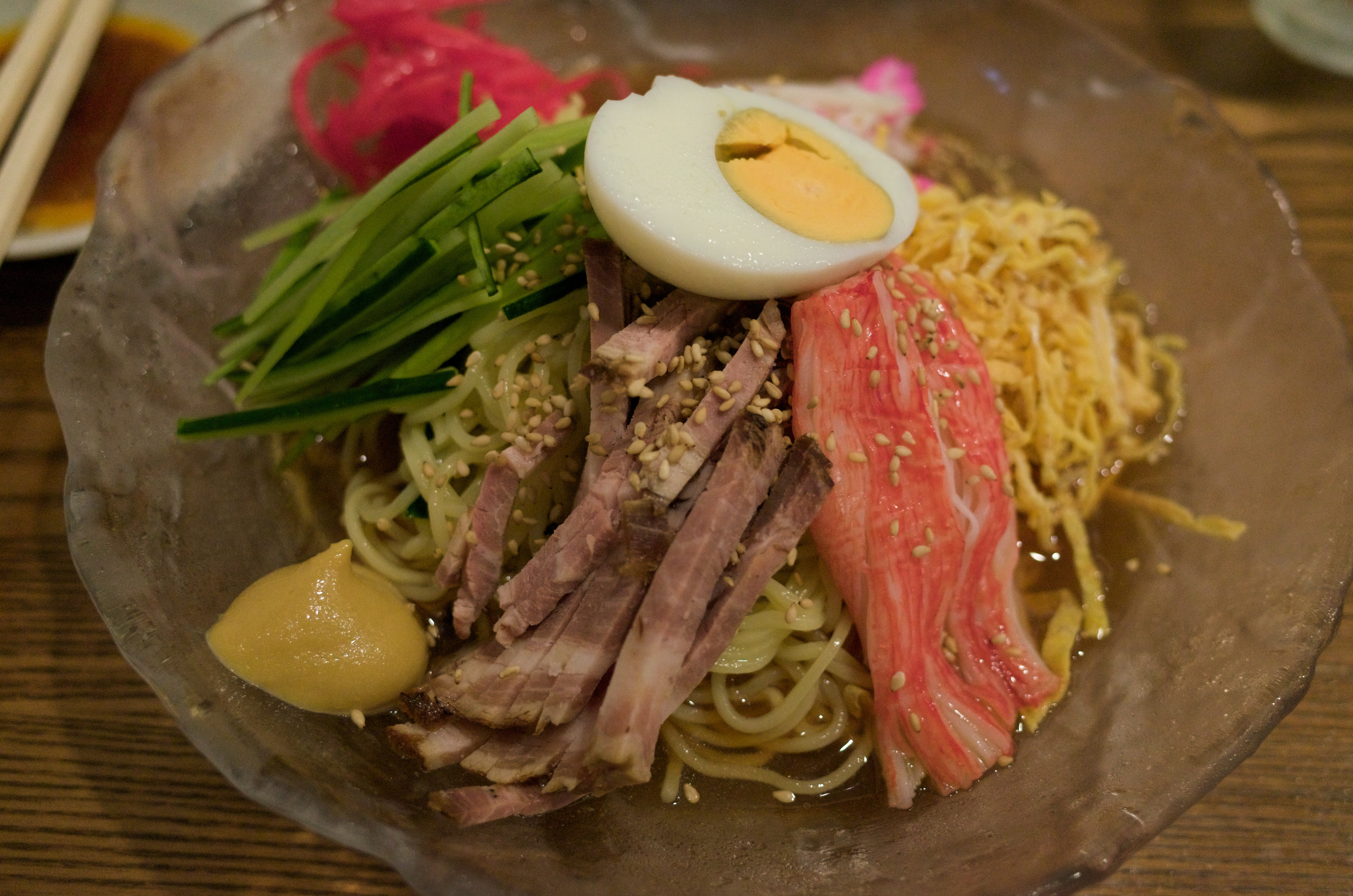
Hiyashi chūka is a cold seasonal dish offered during the summer

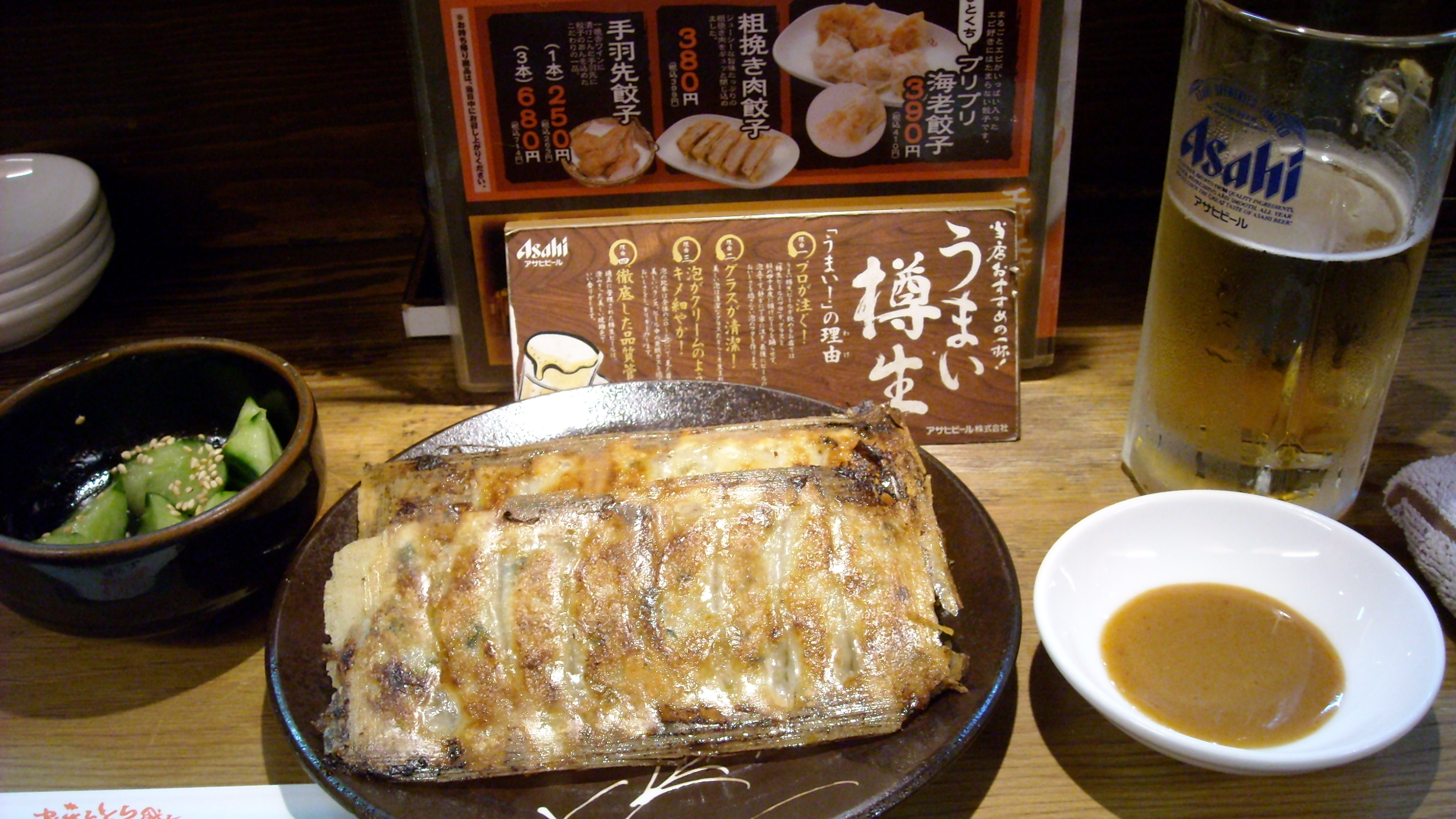
Gyoza is a popular side dish

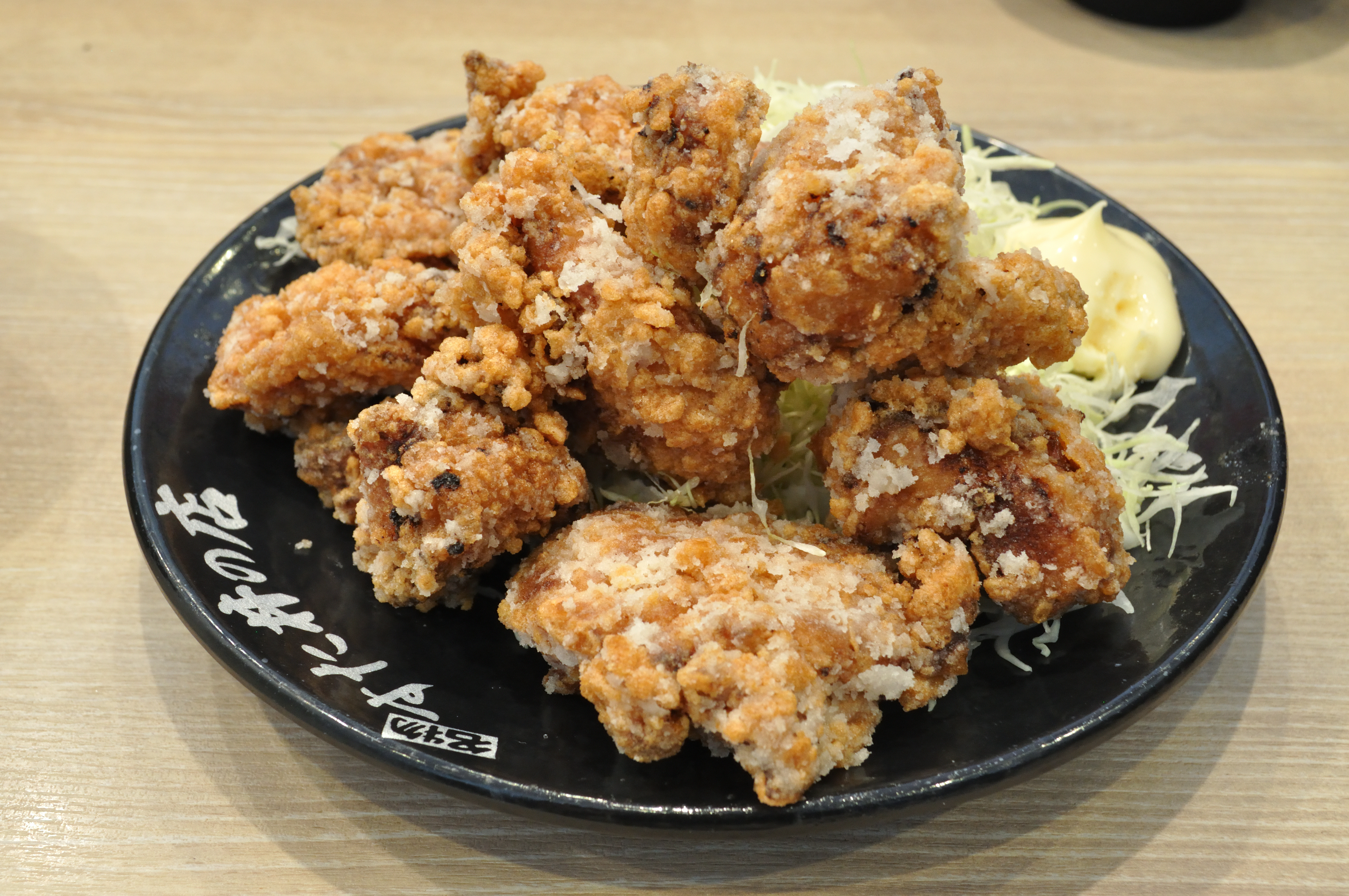
Chicken karaage is also popular

== In popular culture ==
- The Japanese film Tampopo involves a premise of the characters encountering difficulties in attempts to create the best noodle shop in Japan.
- The film Blade Runner has scenes where the main character is served ramen at an outdoor sit-down shop in futuristic Los Angeles.
- In the Naruto manga and anime series, a prominent ramen shop called Ichiraku Ramen—based on a real-life ramen restaurant—is the favourite dining establishment of main character Naruto Uzumaki.
- The Singaporean-Japanese film Ramen Teh illustrates the international appeal of ramen as chef seeks his Singaporean roots following the death of his father.

== See also ==
- Izakaya
- List of noodle restaurants
- List of Japanese restaurants
- CupNoodles Museum
- Noodle soup
- Shin-Yokohama Rāmen Museum
- Yatai – food stalls in Japan that typically serve ramen and other foods
