= Ramen Jiro =

Japanese restaurant chain

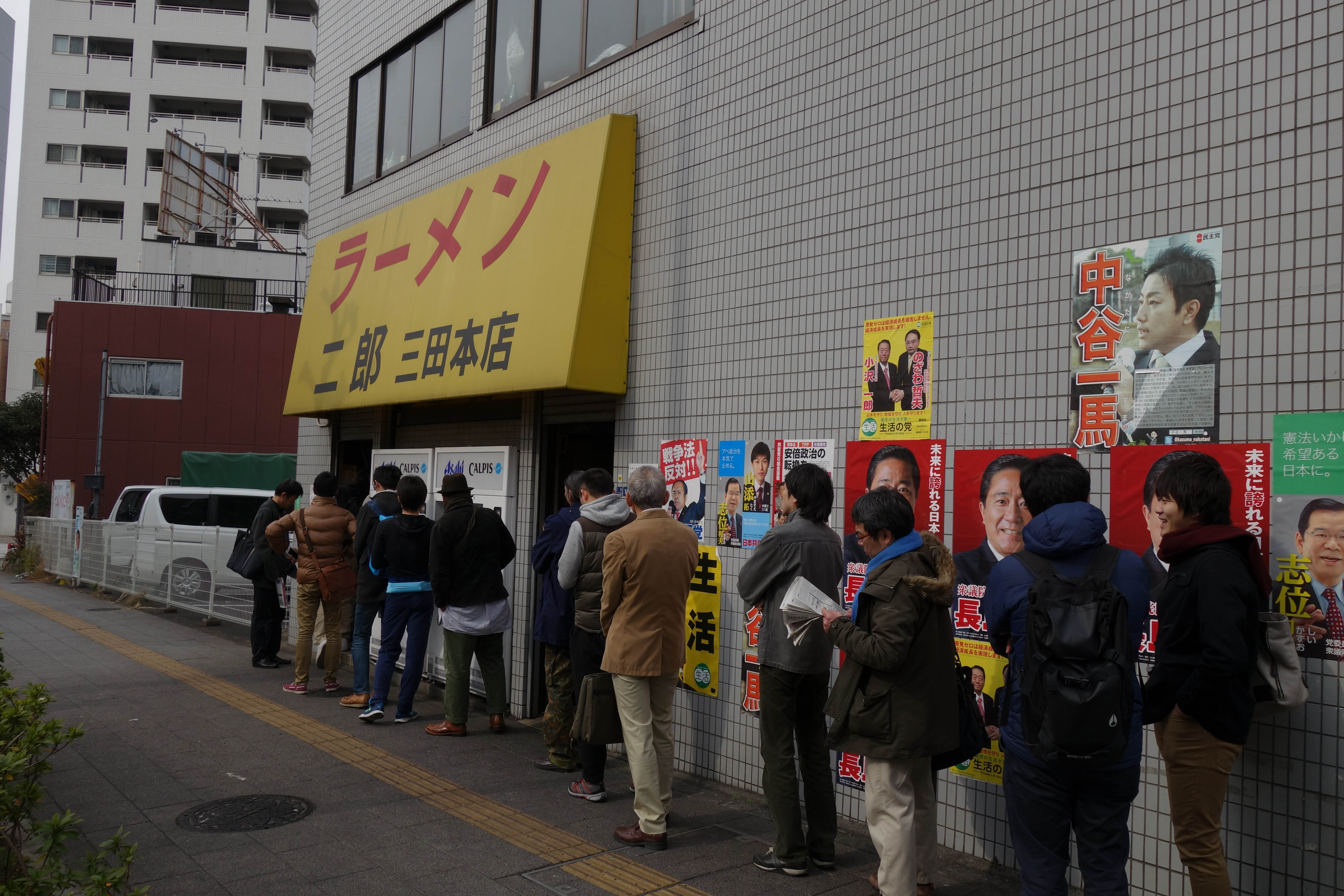
- A line outside the flagship store in Mita, Tokyo
- Industry: Foodservice
- Founded: 1968; 58 years ago

Ramen Jiro (Japanese: ラーメン二郎, Hepburn: Rāmen Jirō) is a Japanese chain of ramen shops founded by Takumi Yamada. Yamada opened the first Ramen Jiro in Meguro, Tokyo in 1968. As of 2018, there are approximately 40 locations across Japan, over 30 of which are in the greater Tokyo area. Ramen Jiro is known for its large portions and its distinctly flavored broth, which enthusiasts call "Jirolian style." In 2009, The Guardian included Ramen Jiro on its list of "The 50 best things to eat in the world".

== History ==
Ramen Jiro was founded by Yamada in 1968 in the city of Meguro, Tokyo, located near Tokyo Metropolitan University. According to Yamada, the restaurant initially served a thinner, lighter style of ramen. However, with the help of a neighboring Chinese restaurant, Yamada developed the new, distinctive flavor that became known as "Jirolian style." This style is characterized by a salty shoyu and tonkotsu soup base, with thick dense noodles and fatty pork chunks. During Tokyo's redevelopment in the early 1970s, the first Ramen Jiro shop moved to Mita, Tokyo. During the move, there was an error in painting the sign, using the characters 二郎 instead of 次郎 for Jirō, a common boy's name. Instead of correcting it, Yamada decided to change the characters of the name to 二郎.

Ramen Jiro quickly gained popularity among Keio students due to its proximity to Keio University. In 1995, the shop in Mita was forced to relocate due to the city's redevelopment. As a result, students petitioned the university to move the restaurant to the Keio campus. The University administration declined the petition, but Yamada managed to move the shop to another location in Mita, where the flagship shop now stands. Additionally in 1995, Ramen Jiro opened its second shop in Meguro and the franchise has steadily expanded since.

=== Nutrition ===
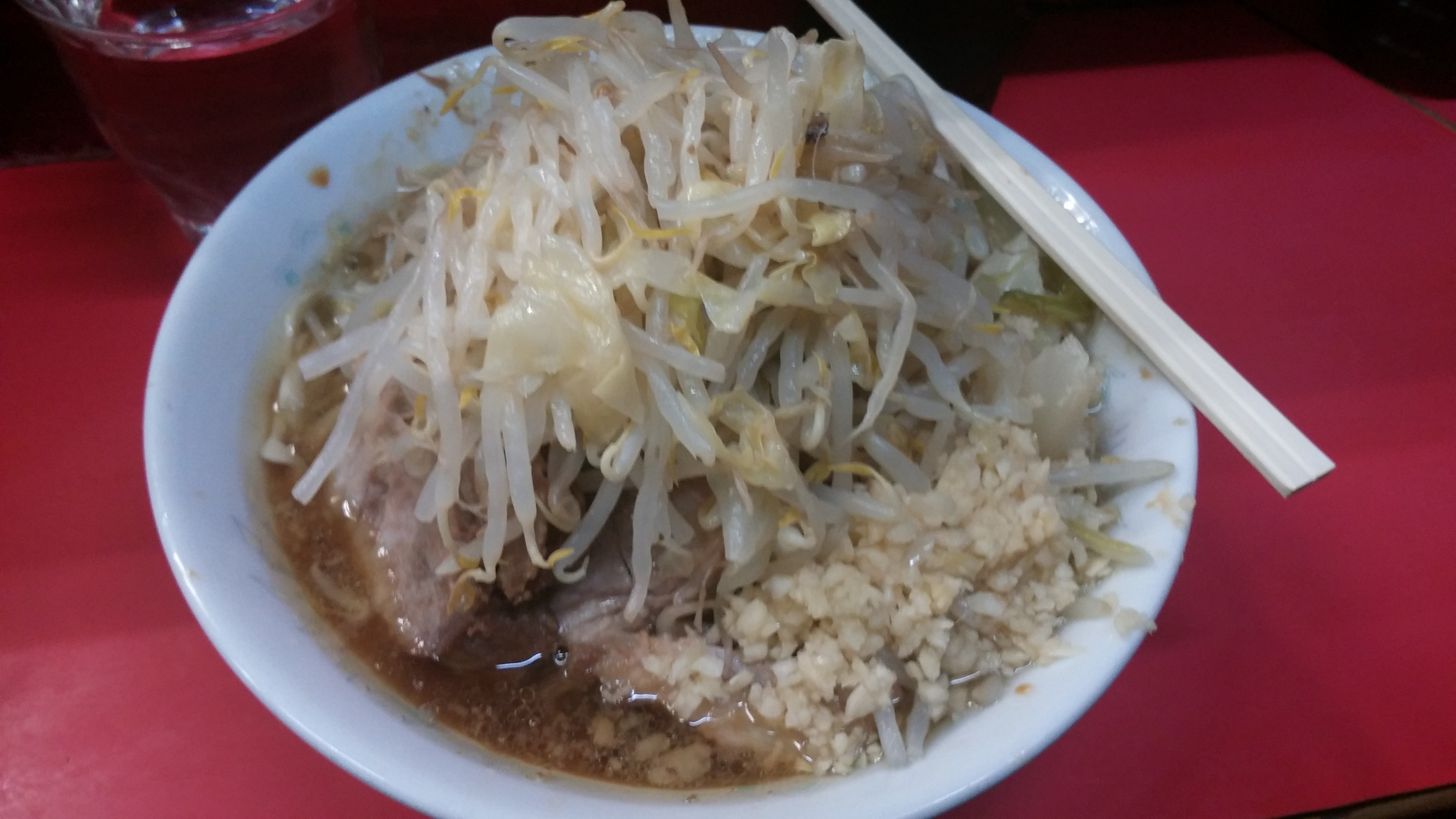
Small-size Jiro's ramen with garlic and vegetables as a free option

One small-sized bowl of Jiro's ramen is estimated to contain a combined 300g of broth and noodles with an estimated 1600 kcal, whereas the average small-sized bowl at a typical Japanese ramen shop contains under 200g of broth and noodles and 600 kcal. Since Jiro's ramen is high in carbohydrates and fats and has little nutritional value, it is often described as a junk food by food critics.

== Reception ==
=== Aficionados ===
Ramen Jiro has an avid fan base called Jirorian (ジロリアン). According to Noriko Arai, an economics professor at Sophia University, Ramen Jiro employs a "worshipper" type of marketing, relying on a small group of enthusiastic customers, typically students and salarymen. Some Jirorians make a pact to visit all 40 Jiro franchises and regard the first shop in Mita as "the sacred place."

=== Internet culture ===
Twitter user @habomaijiro, known for his unique daily reviews of Ramen Jiro, gathered more than 35,000 followers. When he stopped his updates in 2016 due to "an unexpected accident," several prominent Japanese internet sites reported the incident.

In 2018, data scientist Kenji Doi created software that was able to pinpoint at which of the 40 locations a bowl of ramen was made just by uploading a picture of the ramen. Utilizing the alpha version of AutoML by Google, it had a 94.5% success rate when differentiating between the locations despite the bowls looking so similar. After its publication on Twitter, the software was featured by several tech publications, including Google and The Verge.

== See also ==
- Ramen shop
- Japanese cuisine
