= Muteppou =

Japanese ramen restaurant chain

Muteppou Co., Ltd.
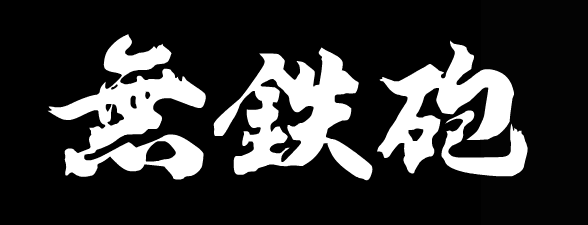

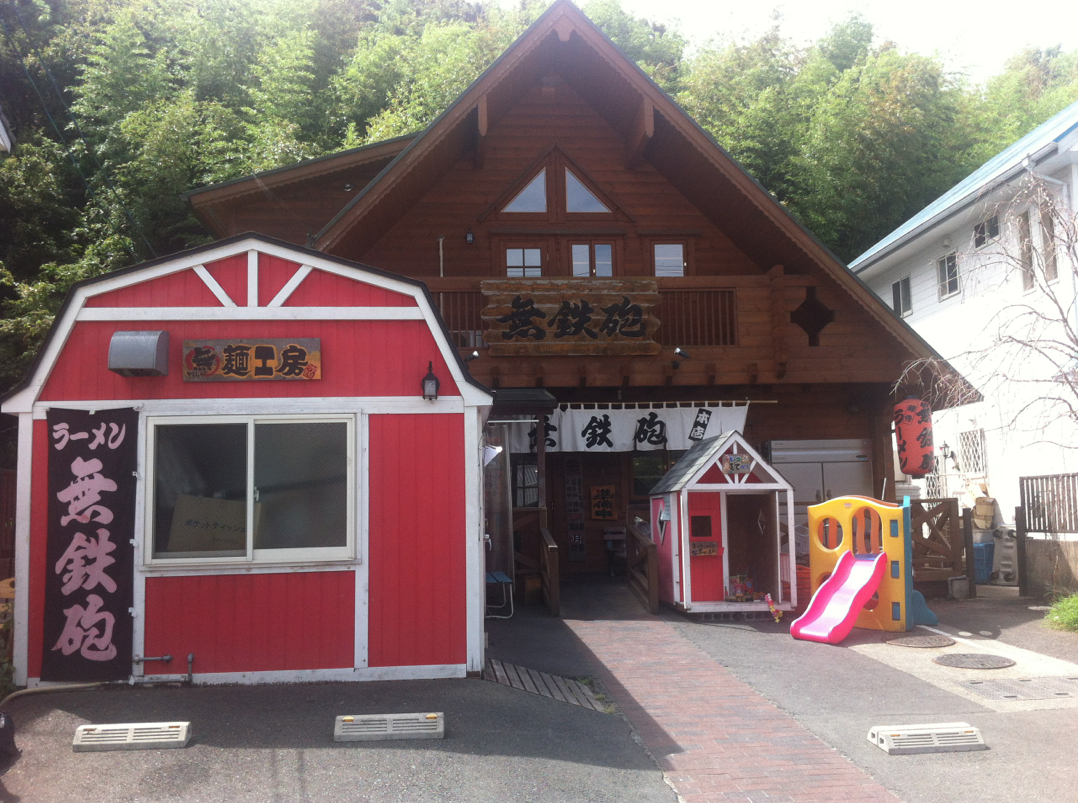
- First restaurant in Kyoto, Japan
- Native name: 無鉄砲
- Industry: Foodservice
- Founded: 1998; 28 years ago
- Founder: Shigeyuki Akasako
- Headquarters: Kizugawa, Kyoto, Japan
- Area served: Japan; Australia
- Website: www.muteppou.com

Muteppou Co., Ltd. (有限会社無鉄砲, Yugen-gaisha Muteppou) is a Japanese ramen noodle restaurant chain headquartered in Kizugawa, Kyoto, Japan.

== History ==
The first restaurant was opened in Nara by Shigeyuki Akasako in 1998. The main restaurant moved to Kyoto in 2003. Muteppou has opened restaurants in Japan and Australia. Butanohone, Gumshara, Shabaton, Mushin, Mukyoku, Museimen are other brands of Muteppou. The restaurants serve a thick pork bone soup. At the main restaurant, 300 kg of pork bones are used a day. The soup is made only from pork bones and water.

== Locations ==
=== Japan ===
- Kyoto Prefecture (Muteppou)
- Osaka Prefecture (Muteppou)
- Nara Prefecture (Butanohone, Gumshara, Shabaton, Mushin, Museimen)
- Nakano, Tokyo (Muteppou, Gumshara, Mukyoku)

=== Australia ===
- Sydney (Gumshara)

== Ramen dishes ==
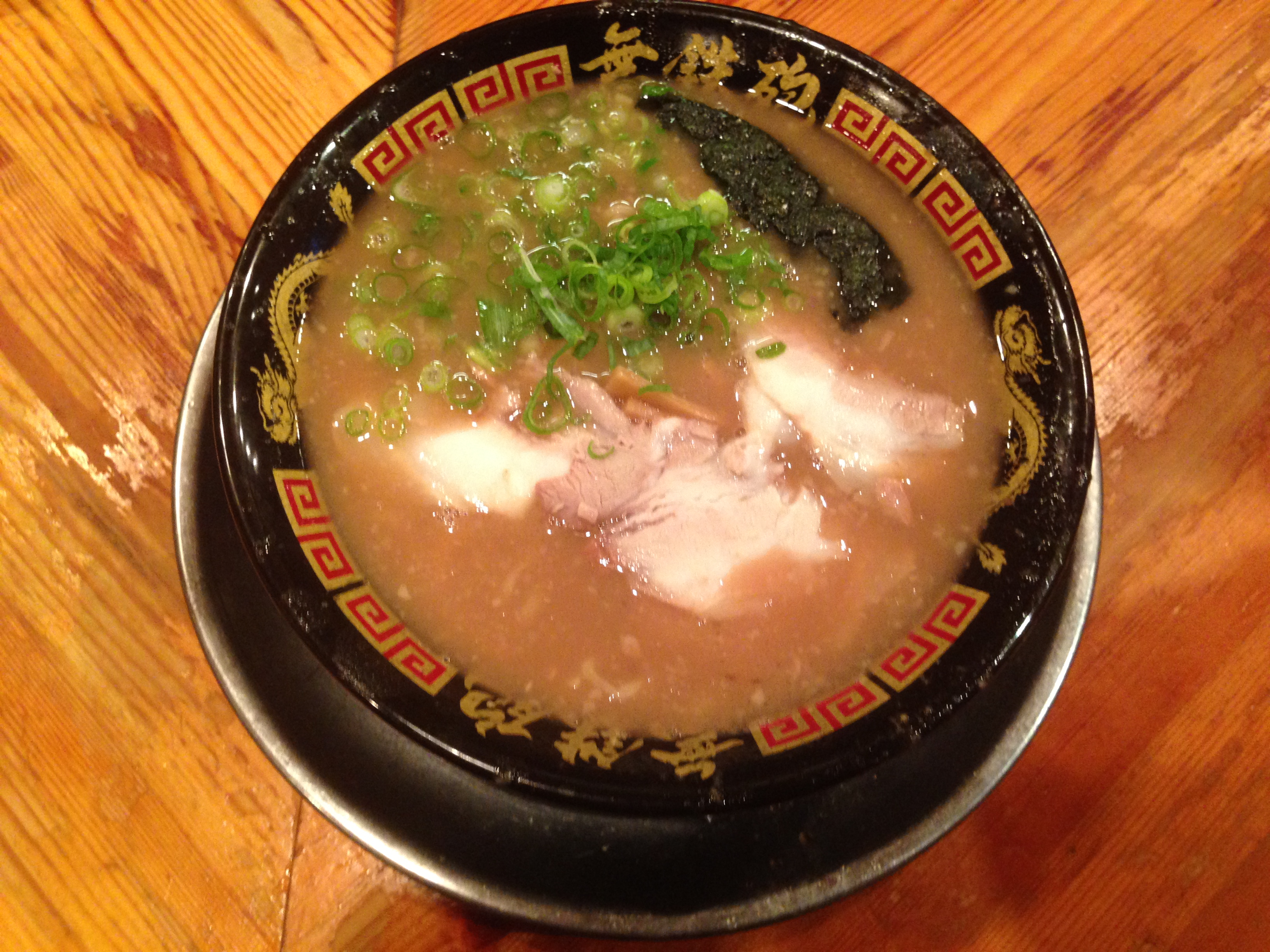
Tonkotsu ramen (Muteppou Kyoto)

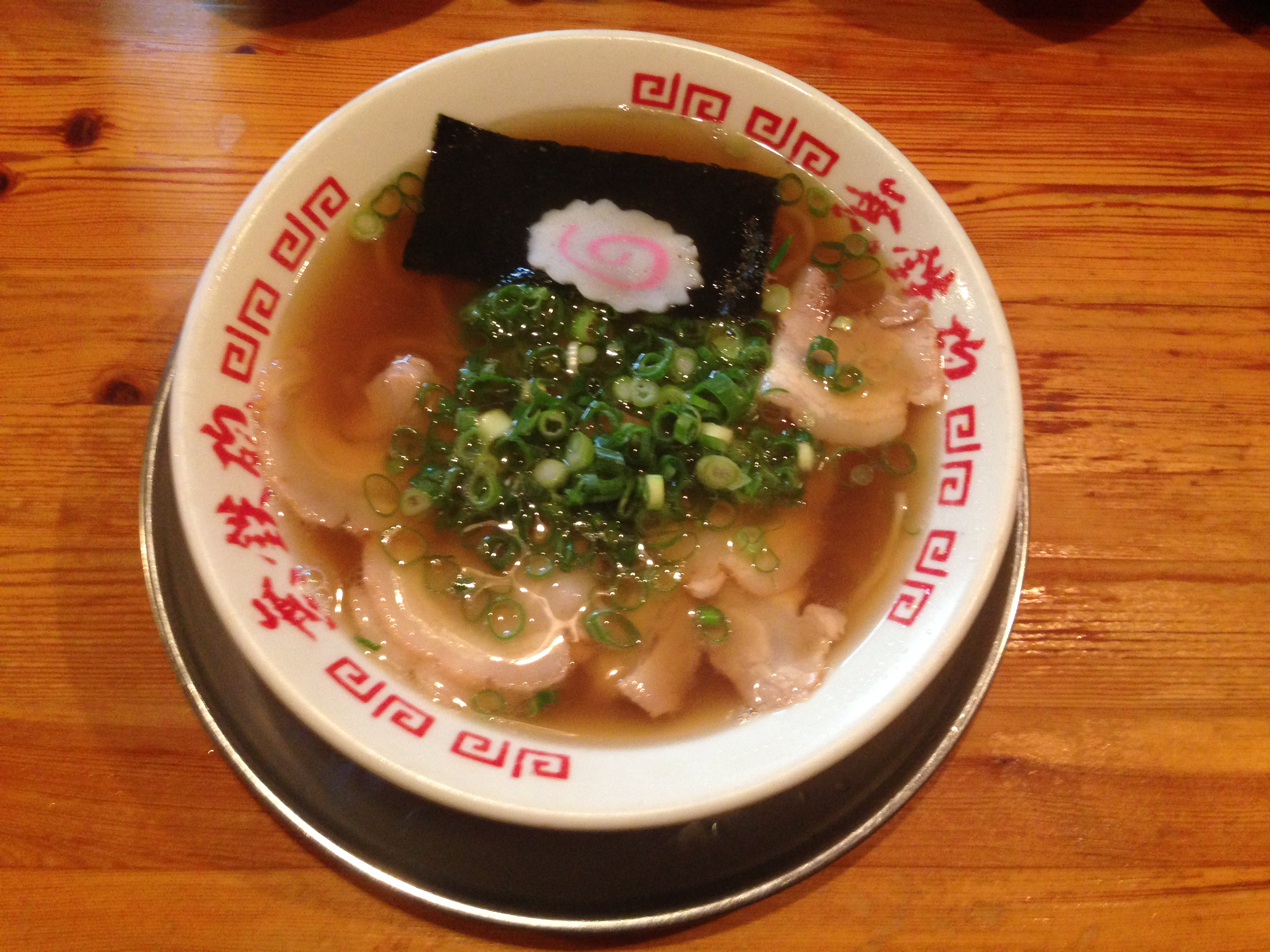
Shōyu ramen (Muteppou Kyoto)

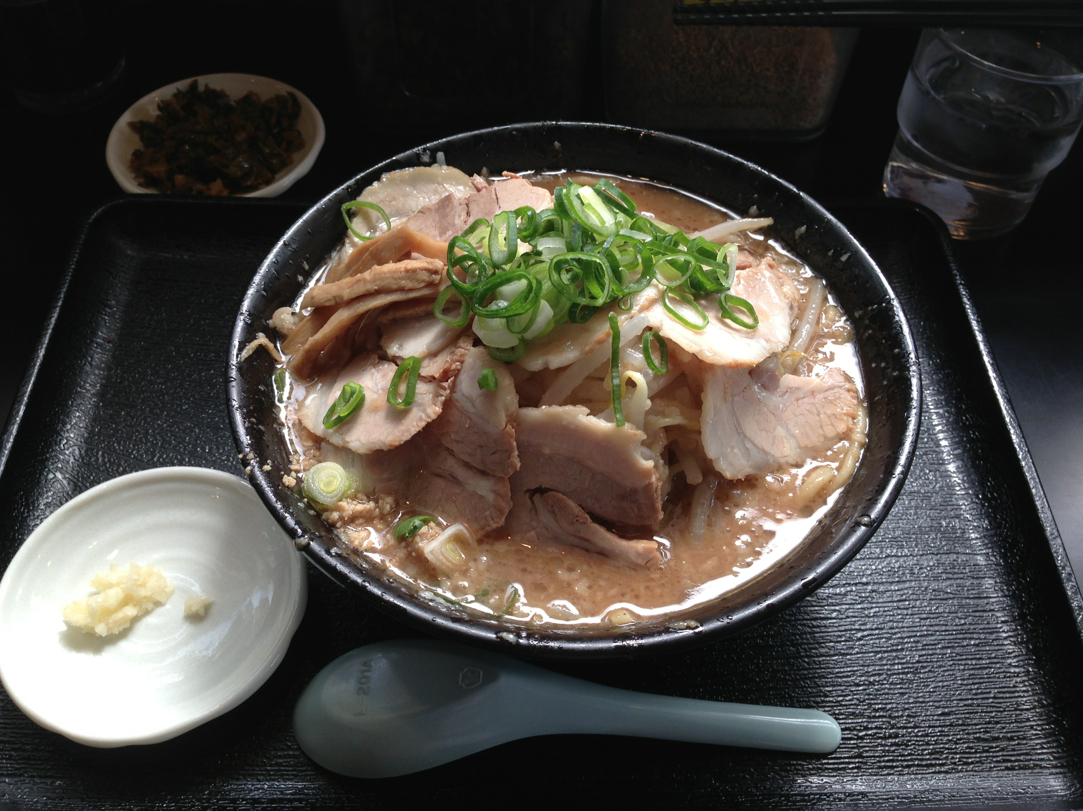
Buta-soba (Shabaton Nara)

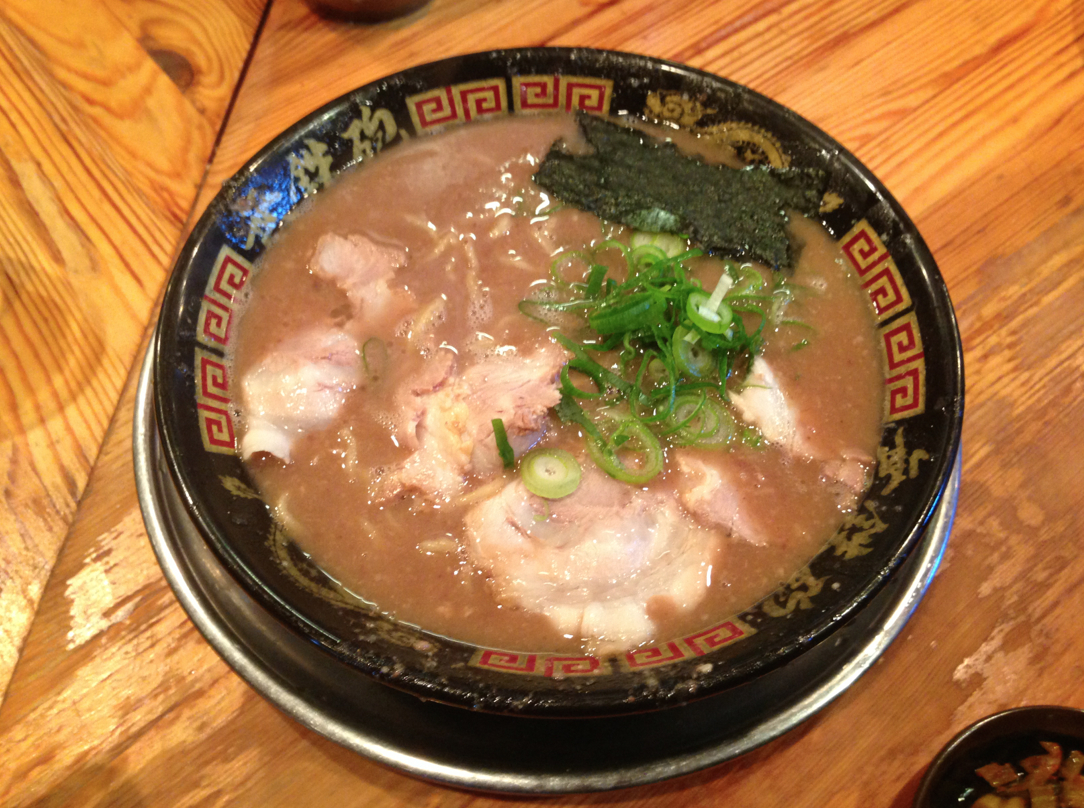
Buta-nibo ramen (Butanohone)

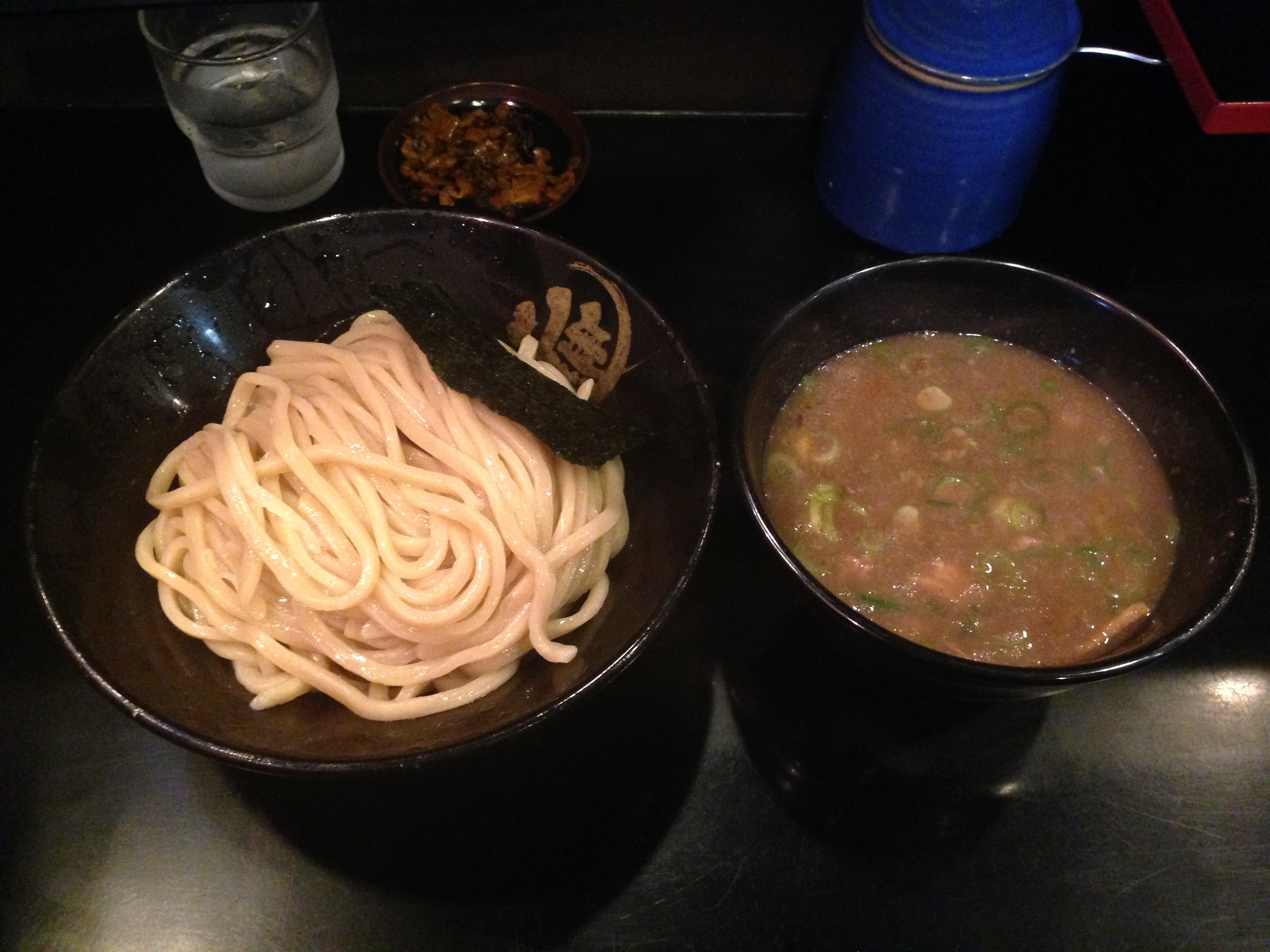
Tonkotsu tsukemen (Mushin Nara)

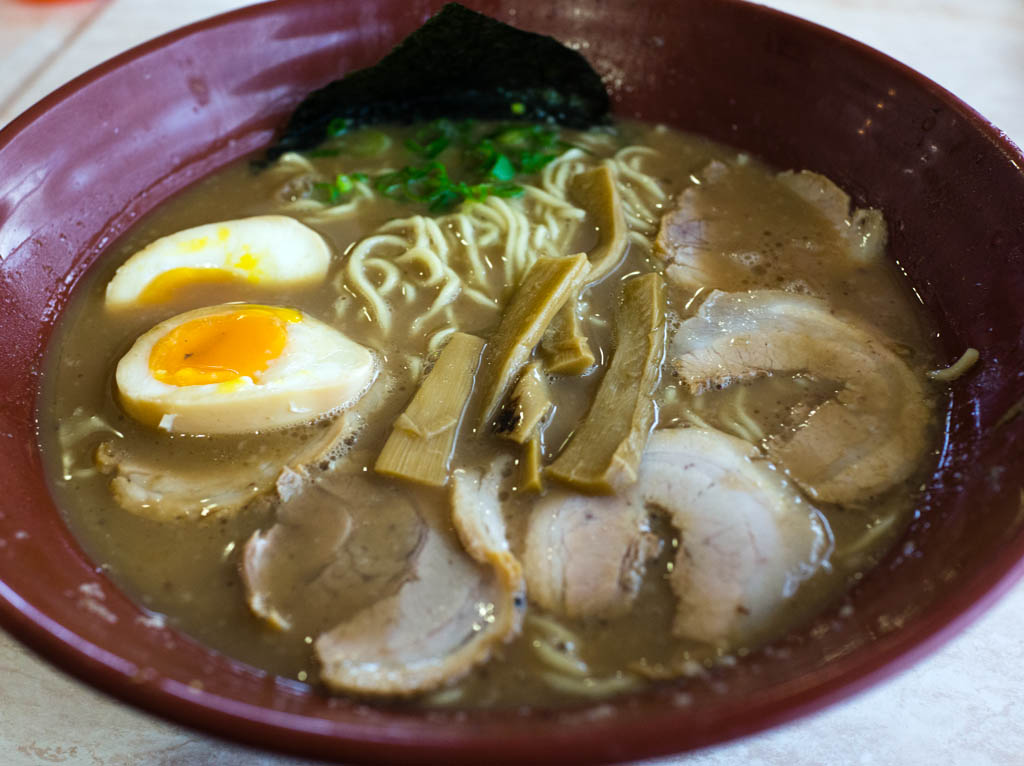
Tonkotsu ramen (Gumshara Australia)

== Restaurants ==
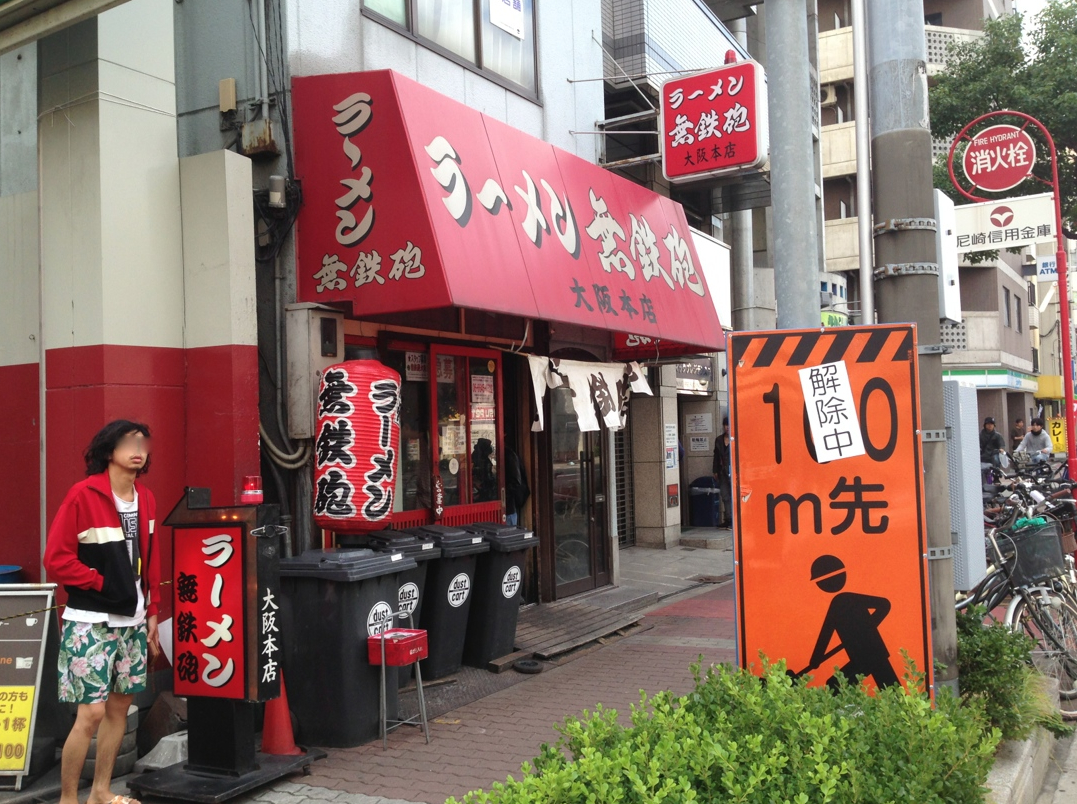
Muteppou Osaka

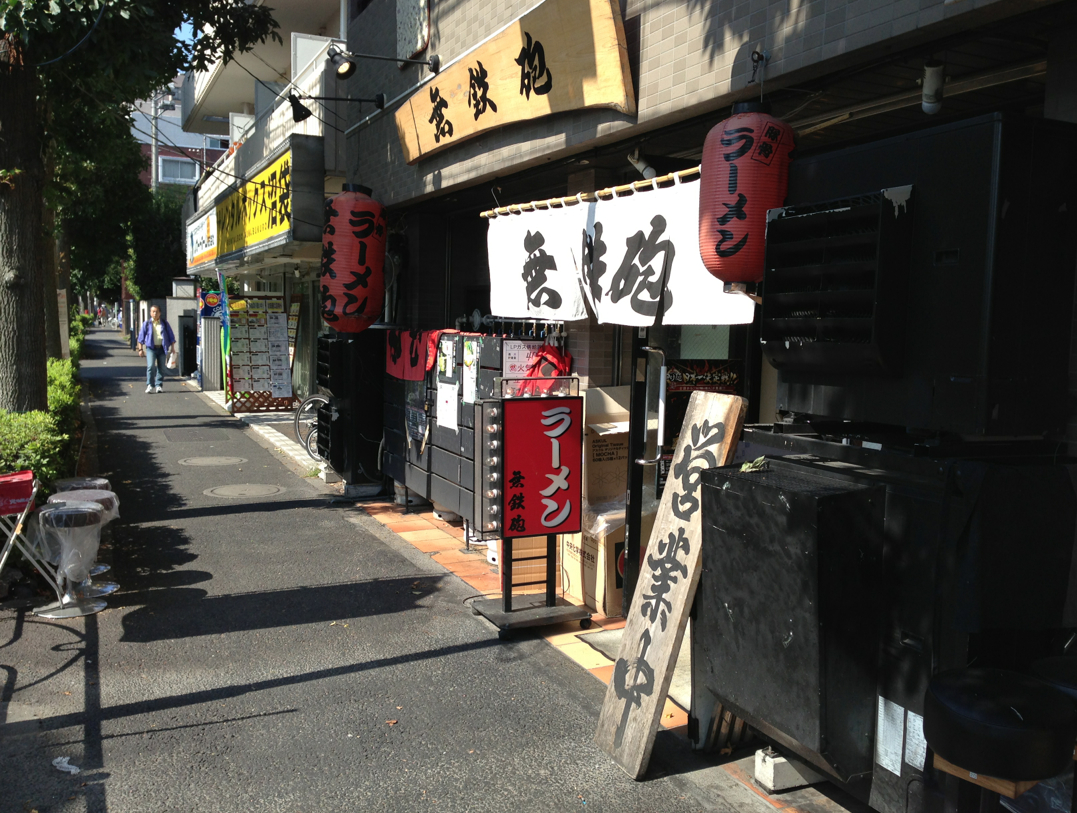
Muteppou Nakano Tokyo

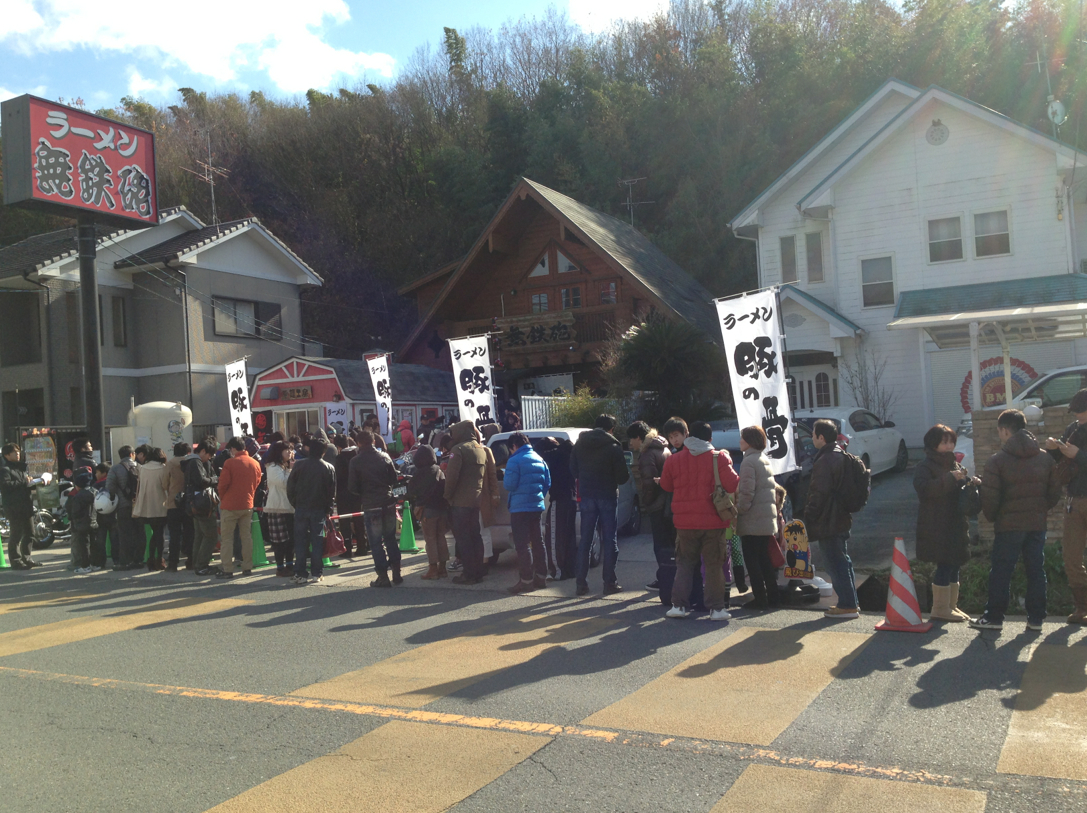
Butanohone

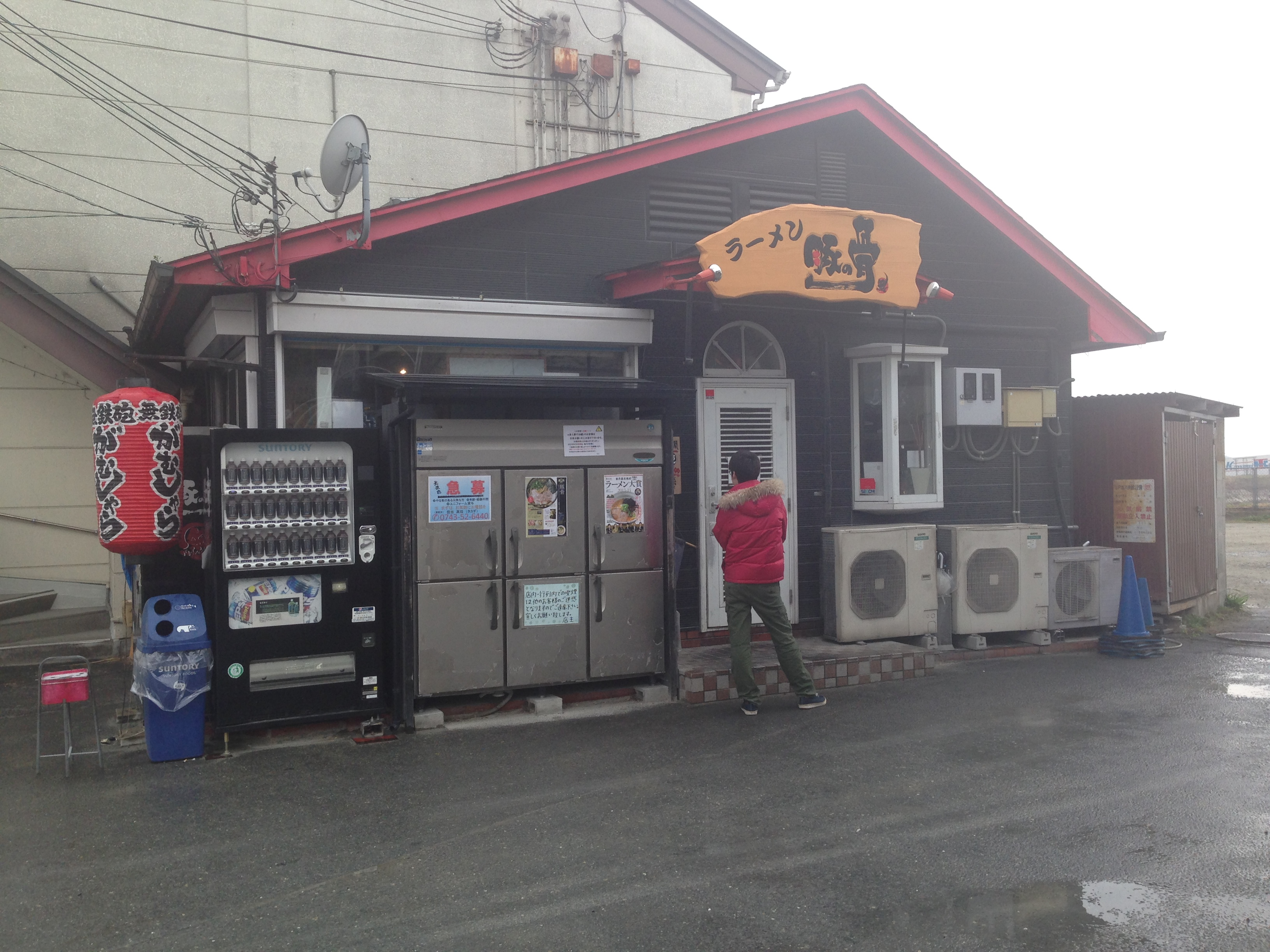
Muteppou Gumshara Nara

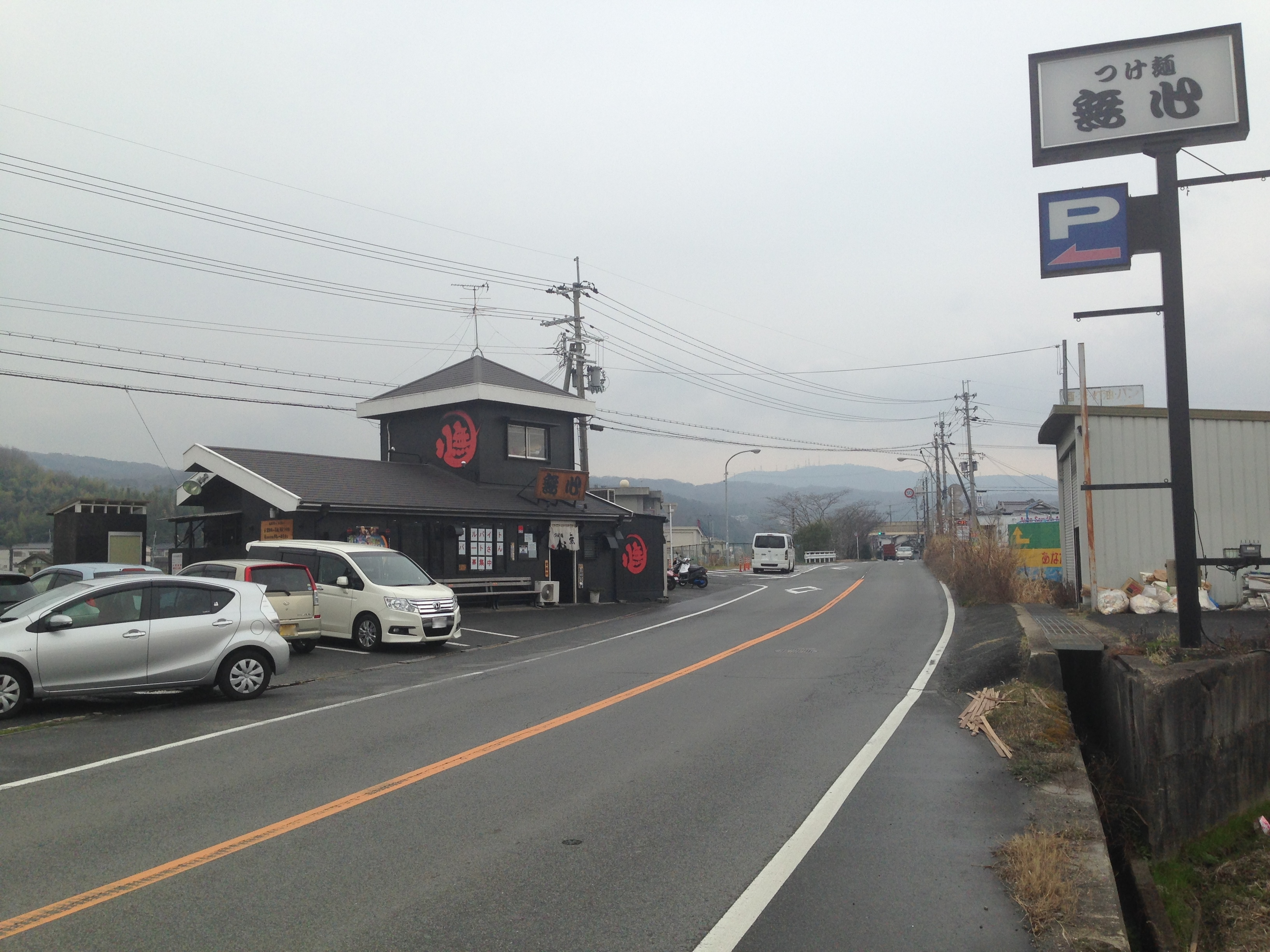
Muteppou Tsukemen Mushin Nara

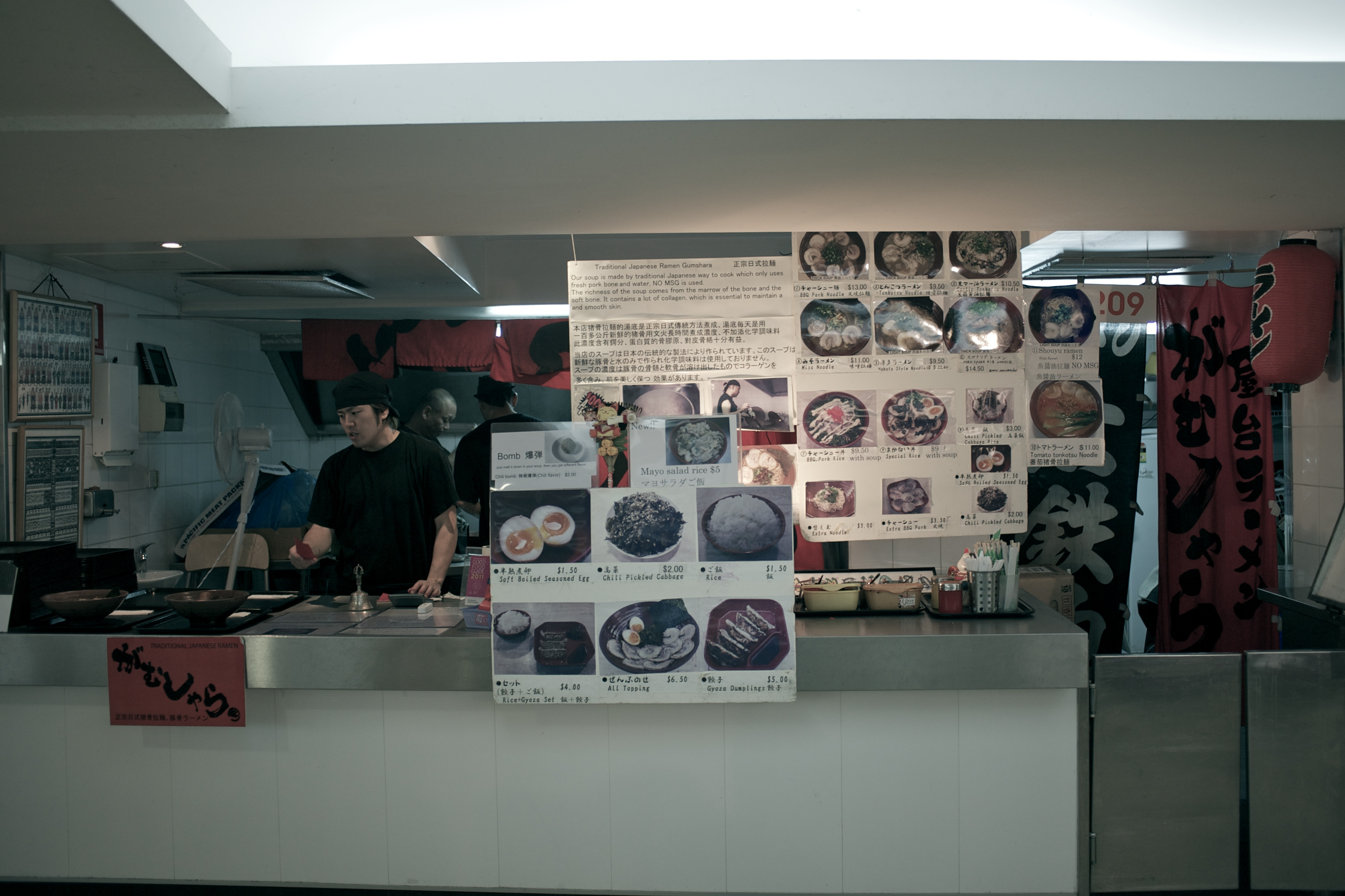
Muteppou Gumshara Australia

== See also ==
- Ramen shop
