= Jinya Ramen Bar =

Chain of restaurants based in Los Angeles, California

JINYA Ramen Bar
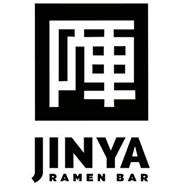
- Company type: Franchise
- Industry: Restaurant
- Founded: 2000; 26 years ago
- Founder: Tomo Takahashi
- Headquarters: Canada, and United States
- Products: Ramen
- Website: jinyaramenbar.com

JINYA Ramen Bar is a chain of restaurants based in Los Angeles, California, specializing in ramen noodle dishes. The restaurants are located across the Lower 48, Washington DC, and Hawaii in the US; and Burnaby, Calgary, Edmonton, and Vancouver in Canada. Los Angeles food critic Jonathan Gold has praised the restaurant.

== History ==
Founded by Tomo Takahashi in 2000 in Tokyo, the chain entered the United States market in 2010. The restaurant has 60 locations across Canada and America.

== See also ==
- Ramen shop
