= Tonkotsu ramen =

Ramen variety from Fukuoka, Japan

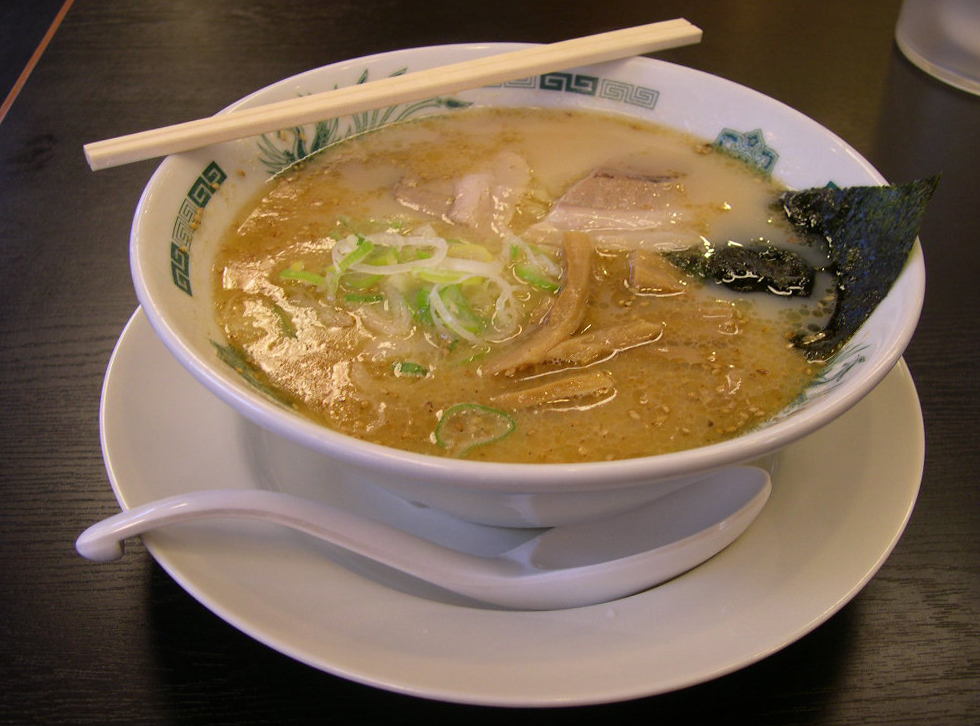
- Tonkotsu ramen
- Alternative names: Hakata ramen
- Type: Noodle soup
- Place of origin: Japan
- Region or state: Fukuoka
- Created by: Tokio Miyamoto
- Invented: 1937
- Main ingredients: Ramen; pork; broth; chāshū
- Variations: Kagoshima ramen

Tonkotsu ramen (豚骨ラーメン) is a ramen dish that originated in Kurume, Fukuoka Prefecture, Japan, and is a specialty dish on the island of Kyushu.

The broth for tonkotsu ramen is based on pork bones, which is what the word tonkotsu (豚骨(とんこつ)) means in Japanese. It is prepared by boiling the bones in water for up to eighteen hours, at which point the soup becomes cloudy in appearance. Additional broth ingredients can include onion, garlic, spring onions, ginger, pork back fat, pig's trotters, oil, and chicken carcass. The dish is traditionally topped with chāshū (sliced pork belly), and additional ingredients can include kombu, kikurage, shōyu, chili bean paste, and sesame seeds.

The traditional preparation method for tonkotsu ramen is for the noodles to be hard in the center. Some ramen shops allow customers to select the level of firmness, including futsū for regular or standard, harigane for very hard, barikata for al dente, and yawamen for soft. Some restaurants also provide a second order of noodles if requested by the customer, in a system referred to as kaedama.

== History ==
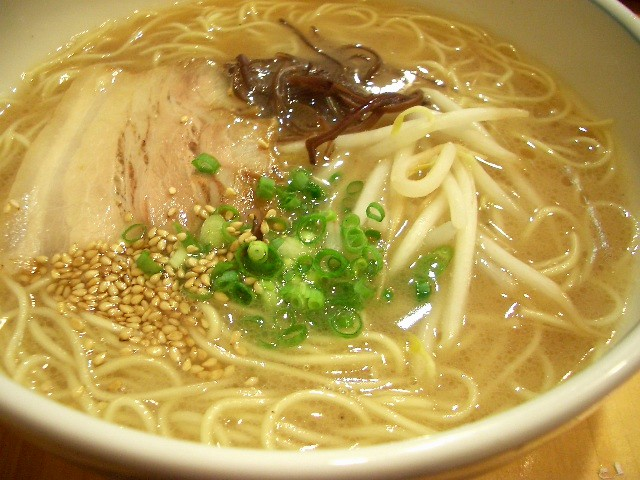
A close-up view of tonkotsu ramen

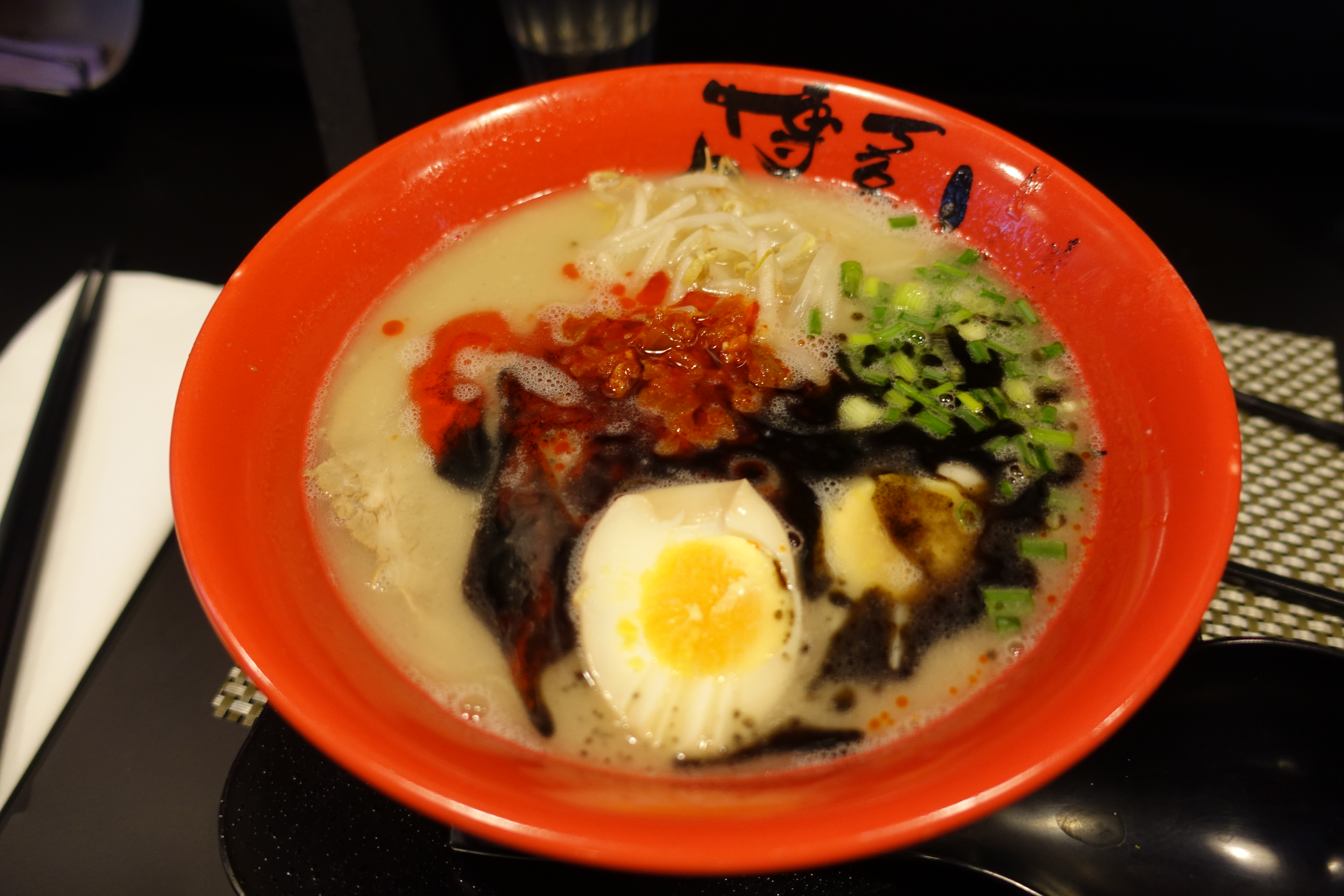
Ramen in pork bone broth

Tonkotsu ramen was invented in 1937 by Tokio Miyamoto, a yatai food vendor, in Kurume, Fukuoka Prefecture, in northern Kyushu. The dish was further refined to its milky appearance by Katsumi Sugino when he accidentally overcooked the broth. In Fukuoka, the dish is often referred to as Hakata ramen (博多(はかた)ラーメン), with Hakata being the historical name of central Fukuoka. It was originally prepared as an affordable and easily prepared fast food for laborers at fish markets.

== Noodle firmness ==
Some ramen restaurants in Fukuoka offer customers a choice of noodle firmness levels, which has become a recognizable feature of tonkotsu ramen culture.

Common firmness levels:

- bari-yawa (バリ柔) – very soft
- yawa (柔) – soft
- futsū (普通) – regular (standard firmness)
- katame (硬め) – firm
- bari-kata (バリ硬) – very firm
- harigane (針金) – "wire-like", extremely firm
- kona-otoshi (粉落とし) – literally "flour dusting", noodles barely boiled
- yuge-tōshi (湯気通し) – "steam pass", noodles exposed only to steam

== See also ==
- Japanese regional cuisine
- List of ramen dishes
