= World Instant Noodles Association =

Representative body for instant noodles

- Formation: March 4, 1997; 29 years ago
- Headquarters: CupNoodles Museum Osaka Ikeda
- Chairman: Koki Ando
- Website: https://instantnoodles.org
- Formerly called: International Ramen Manufacturers Association (IRMA)

The World Instant Noodles Association (WINA) is a representative body for the quality, manufacture, and consumption of instant noodles. Headquartered at CupNoodles Museum Osaka Ikeda, the organisation was originally established by the creator of the instant noodle Momofuku Ando.

According to the Union of International Associations, WINA aims to "improve the quality of instant noodles and increase its consumption through mutual exchange of information among manufacturers worldwide; discuss environmental and technical issues; promote mutual friendship, thereby enhancing diets worldwide and contributing to the development of the industry." It works toward the UN Sustainable Development Goals of zero hunger and good health and well-being.

WINA hosts a World Instant Noodles Summit every two years, during which manufacturers can trade innovations and news and provides instant noodles where disaster relief efforts are needed. In 2016, its regular members consisted of 67 instant noodle manufacturers from 21 different countries and regions, and it also had approximately 100 associate members involved in related businesses such as the supply of materials.

== History ==
After Momofuku Ando created and released the first pre-cooked instant noodle Chikin Ramen in 1958 and invented Cup Noodles in 1971, a large number of other manufacturers rapidly became involved in the instant noodle business worldwide; around 40 billion instant noodle units were being consumed a year by the mid-1990s. This prompted Ando to see the need for a regulatory body to ensure the business was not affected by poor quality and lack of oversight. The International Ramen Manufacturers Association (IRMA) was thus established by Ando on March 4, 1997. Its name was later changed to the World Instant Noodles Association following its adoption of the Codex international standards for instant noodles.
