= Top Ramen =

American brand of instant ramen noodles

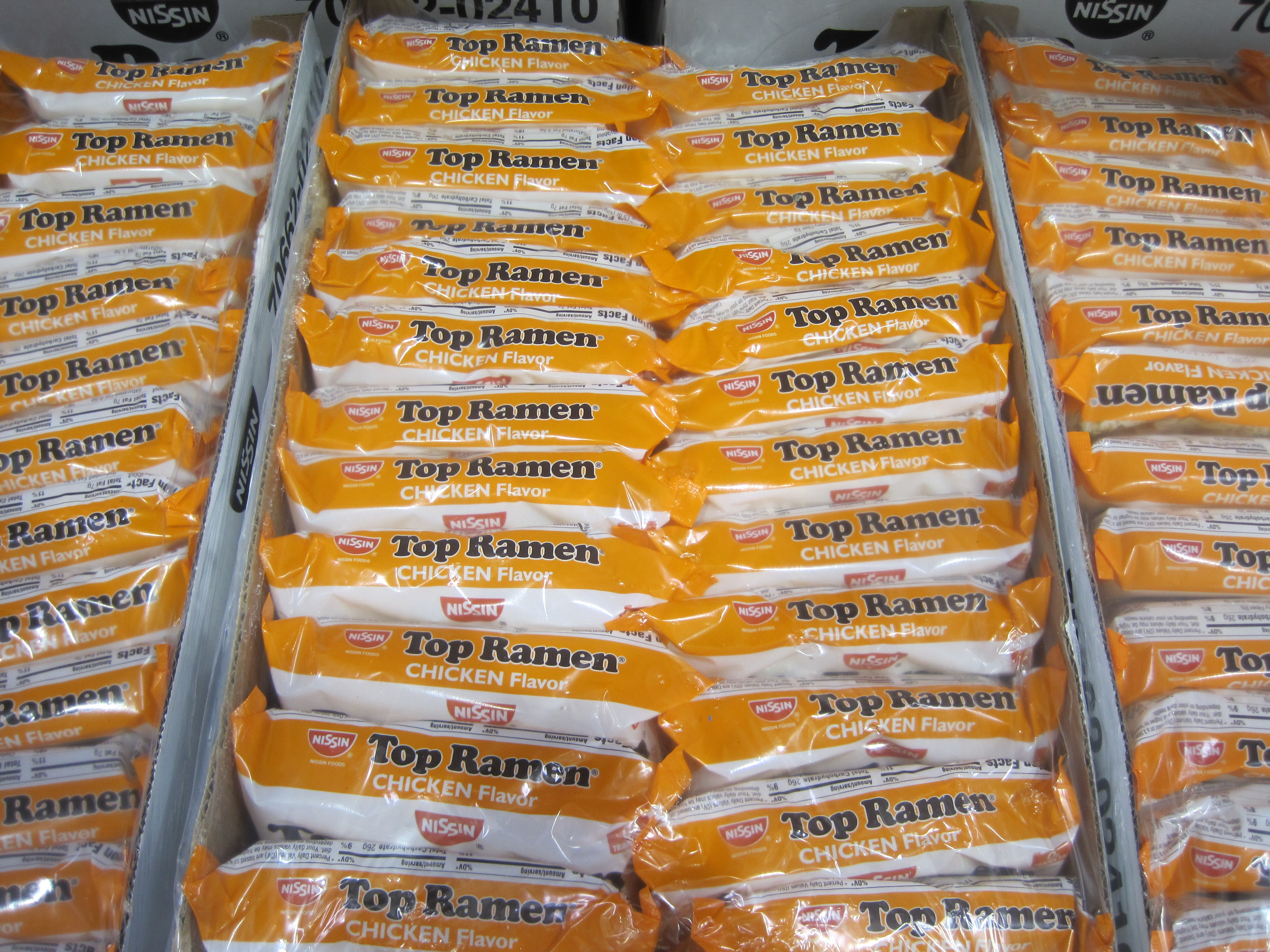
- Chicken flavor packages of Top Ramen
- Produced by: Nissin Foods
- Country: United States
- Introduced: 1970
- Markets: Instant noodle

Top Ramen is an American brand of instant ramen noodles introduced in 1970 by Nissin Foods.

== History ==
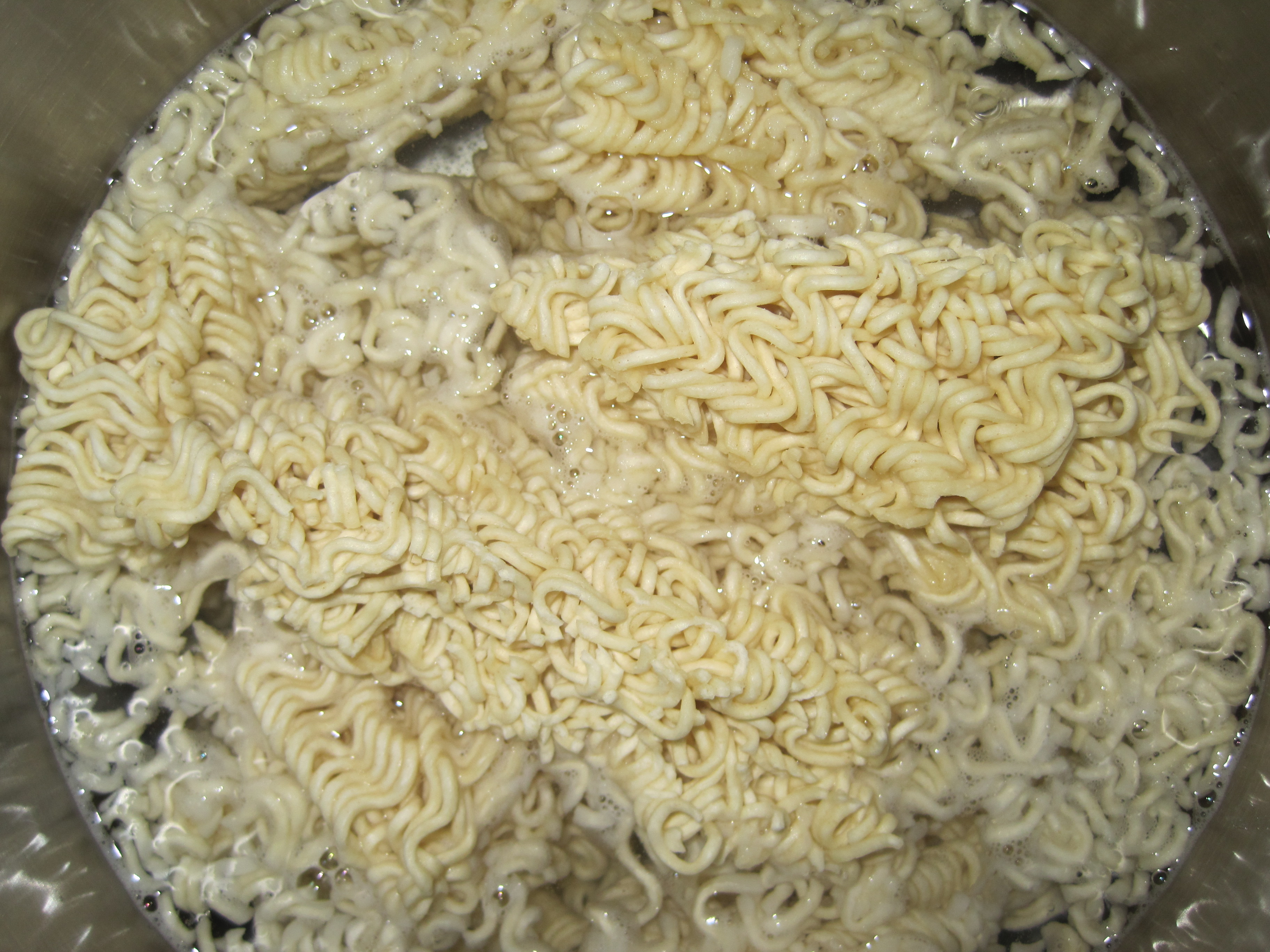
Top Ramen cooking

Instant noodles were invented in 1958 by Momofuku Ando, the Taiwanese-born founder of the Japanese food company Nissin. He used Chicken Ramen as the first brand of instant ramen noodles.

By the late 1960s, Ando desired to enter the US markets, but discovered that most people in the United States did not have ramen-sized bowls or chopsticks. During a business trip to the US, he observed a grocery store manager prepare ramen by placing the block of noodles in a paper cup and pouring boiling water over them, inspiring him to develop the Cup Noodles brand. In 1970, Nissin formed a US subsidiary, and opened their first factory in the US in 1973 in Lancaster, Pennsylvania. Top Ramen became a major corporate force in the international noodle market which was dominated by Maggi.

== Reputation ==
Despite ramen being stereotyped as a "poverty food" which makes up the bulk of a typical US college student's diet, Top Ramen was considered an expensive luxury item when it was initially released. In 1958, it sold for ¥35 (US$0.22), which was comparable to the cost of eating Chinese noodles at a restaurant and several times more than the price of udon noodles at the grocery store. At first many stores were skeptical of Top Ramen's potential to succeed and hesitant to stock it, but by end of the year the product was ubiquitous and stores had difficulty keeping pace with the demand.

Food reviewers' opinions of Top Ramen vary widely, from The Ramen Rater rating the noodles alone 3.25/5 stars and 5/5 stars with some turkey and an egg added, to Douglas Kim, the owner and chef of Jeju Noodle Bar, describing it as tasting "commercial" and "very instant" and rating it 1/5 stars. Andy Kryza of Thrillist ranked Top Ramen as the fourth best instant noodle brand, particularly appreciating its "overpowering beefy/salty suckerpunch," although he said that eating it while sober "doesn't seem right." Consumer Reports criticized Top Ramen's "bland broth and too-soft, almost mushy, noodles," but rated Cup Noodles more favorably, noting that "the food bits are so well done that we can overlook the subpar noodles."

== See also ==
- Frozen noodles
- Instant noodles
- List of instant noodle brands
- Maruchan – manufacturer of instant noodles
- Noodles
- Pot Noodle
- Sapporo Ichiban – manufacturer of instant noodles
