= CupNoodles Museum Yokohama =

Japanese museum

Coordinates: 35°27′19.7″N 139°38′19.9″E

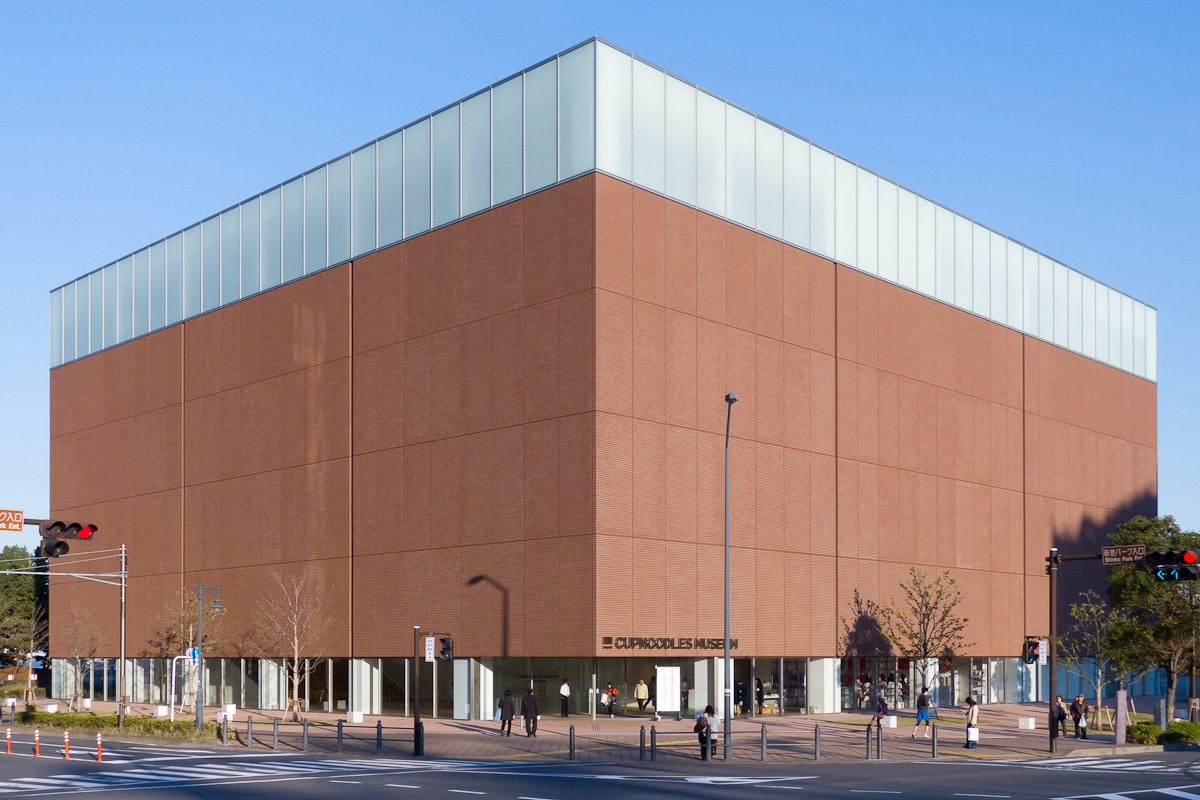
CupNoodles Museum Yokohama

CupNoodles Museum Yokohama (カップヌードルミュージアム 横浜) is a museum dedicated to instant noodles and Cup Noodles, as well as its creator and founder, Momofuku Ando.

Located at Yokohama, the museum features four stories of exhibitions and attractions. This location includes various exhibits to display the history of instant ramen and Momofuku Ando's story.

There is a workshop where you can create your own one-of-a-kind Cup Noodles.

== See also ==
- List of museums in Japan
- CupNoodles Museum Osaka Ikeda
