= Koki Ando =

Japanese businessman

- 安藤 宏基
- Born: October 7, 1947 (age 78); Ikeda, Osaka, Japan
- Occupations: President and CEO of Nissin Foods
- Parent(s): Momofuku Ando; Masako Ando

Signature
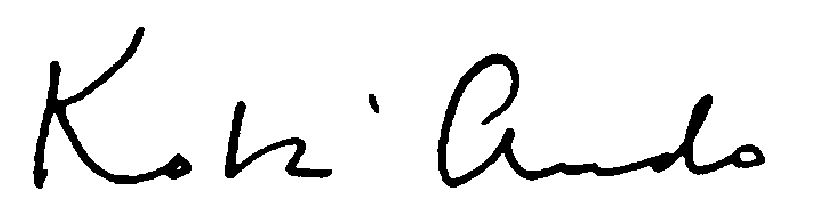

Koki Ando (安藤 宏基, Andō Kōki; born October 7, 1947) is the son of Momofuku Ando, Japanese inventor of Taiwanese descent who created Top Ramen and Cup Noodles. Following his father's death in 2007, Koki Ando has been the president and the CEO of Nissin Foods Holdings Co. Ltd.

== Personal life ==
Andō was born in Ikeda, Osaka on 7 October 1947. After graduating from Keio Faculty of Commerce, he went on to study at Columbia University before joining Nissin Foods in 1973, soon becoming the head of marketing. During his time as head of marketing, he was involved in the development of popular food products such as Yakisoba U.F.O and Donbei Udon.
