= Hảo Hảo =

Brand of instant noodles in Vietnam

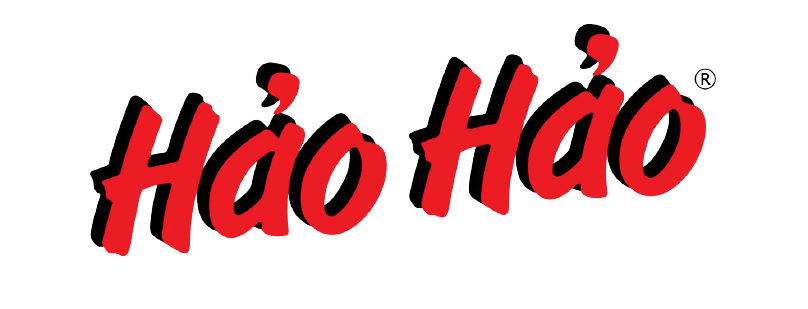
- Product type: Instant noodles
- Current owner: Acecook Vietnam
- Country: Vietnam
- Introduced: September, 2000
- Markets: Inland; International
- Website: https://acecookvietnam.vn/san-pham/mi-hao-hao/

Hảo Hảo is an instant noodles brand created by Acecook Vietnam, first launched in September, 2000. With 8 different flavors, as of 2021, Hảo Hảo has been recognized as one of the most consumed instant noodle brands in Vietnam for 21 years (2000–2021), with sales reaching 30 billion packets of instant noodles.
