= CupNoodles Museum =

CupNoodles Museum may refer to one of two museums in Japan:

- CupNoodles Museum Osaka Ikeda
- CupNoodles Museum Yokohama
