= CupNoodles Museum Osaka Ikeda =

Museum in Japan

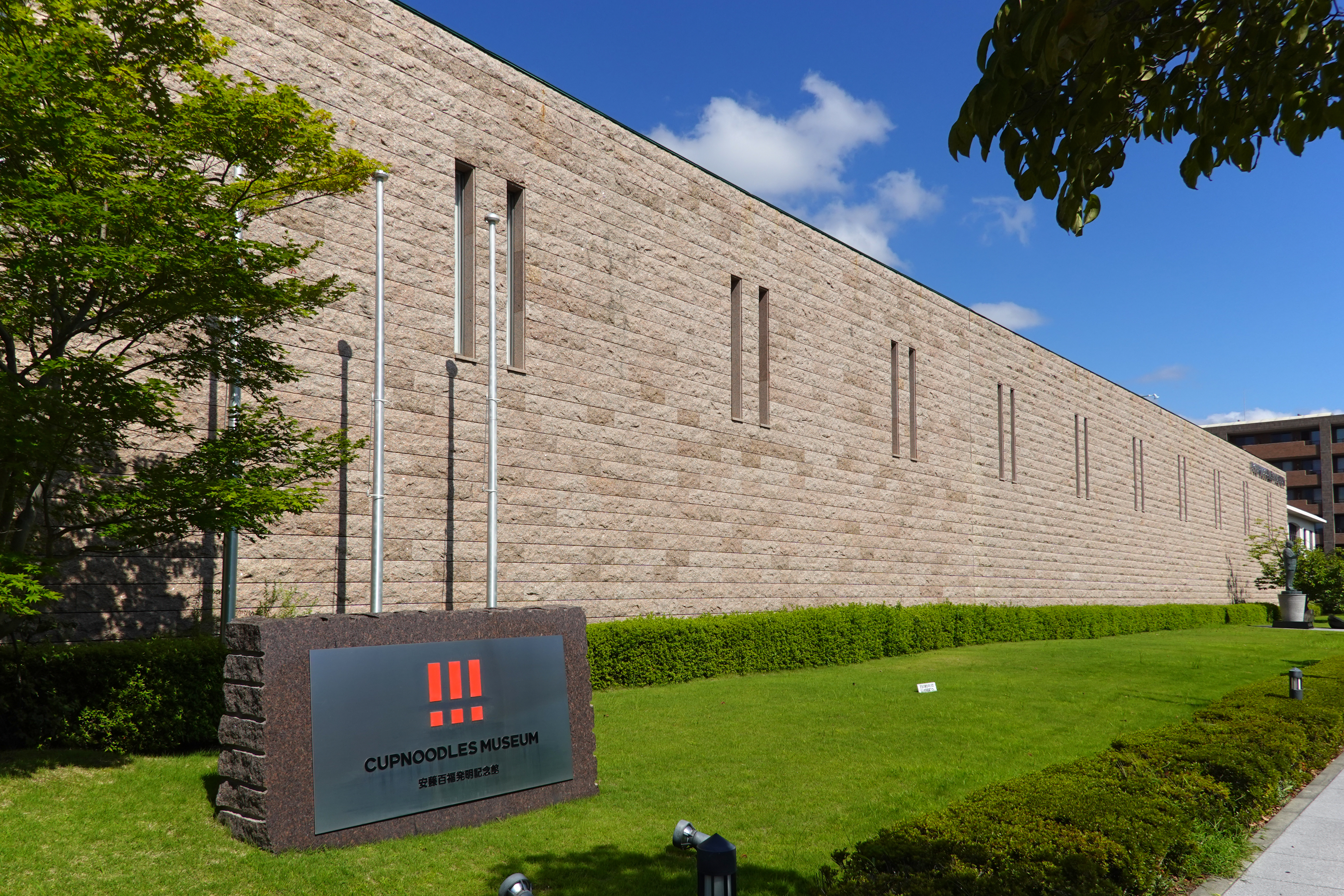
- Exterior with logo
- Established: 21 November 1999
- Location: Ikeda, Osaka, Japan
- Coordinates: 34.818038°N 135.426675°E
- Founder: Nissin Foods
- Website: The Momofuku Ando Instant Ramen Museum (in English)

CupNoodles Museum Osaka Ikeda (カップヌードルミュージアム 大阪池田) is a museum dedicated to instant noodles and Cup Noodles, as well as its creator and founder, Momofuku Ando. The museum is located in Ikeda in Osaka, and is located within walking distance of Ikeda Station on the Hankyu-Takarazuka Line. Admission is free.

There is also a CupNoodles Museum located in Yokohama, which features four stories of exhibitions and attractions. This location includes various exhibits to display the history of instant ramen and Momofuku Ando's story.

== Features ==
Admission is free. Both museums have an instant ramen workshop allowing visitors to make their own "fresh" instant noodles (fresh as in just made). Reservations must be made in advance to enjoy this feature at the museum. There is also a noodle factory where visitors can assemble their own personal Cup Noodles from pre-made ingredients for a small fee of 500 yen.

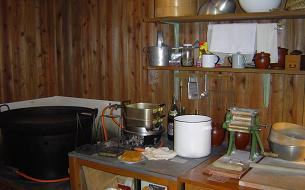
Recreation of Ando's workshop at the Instant Ramen Museum

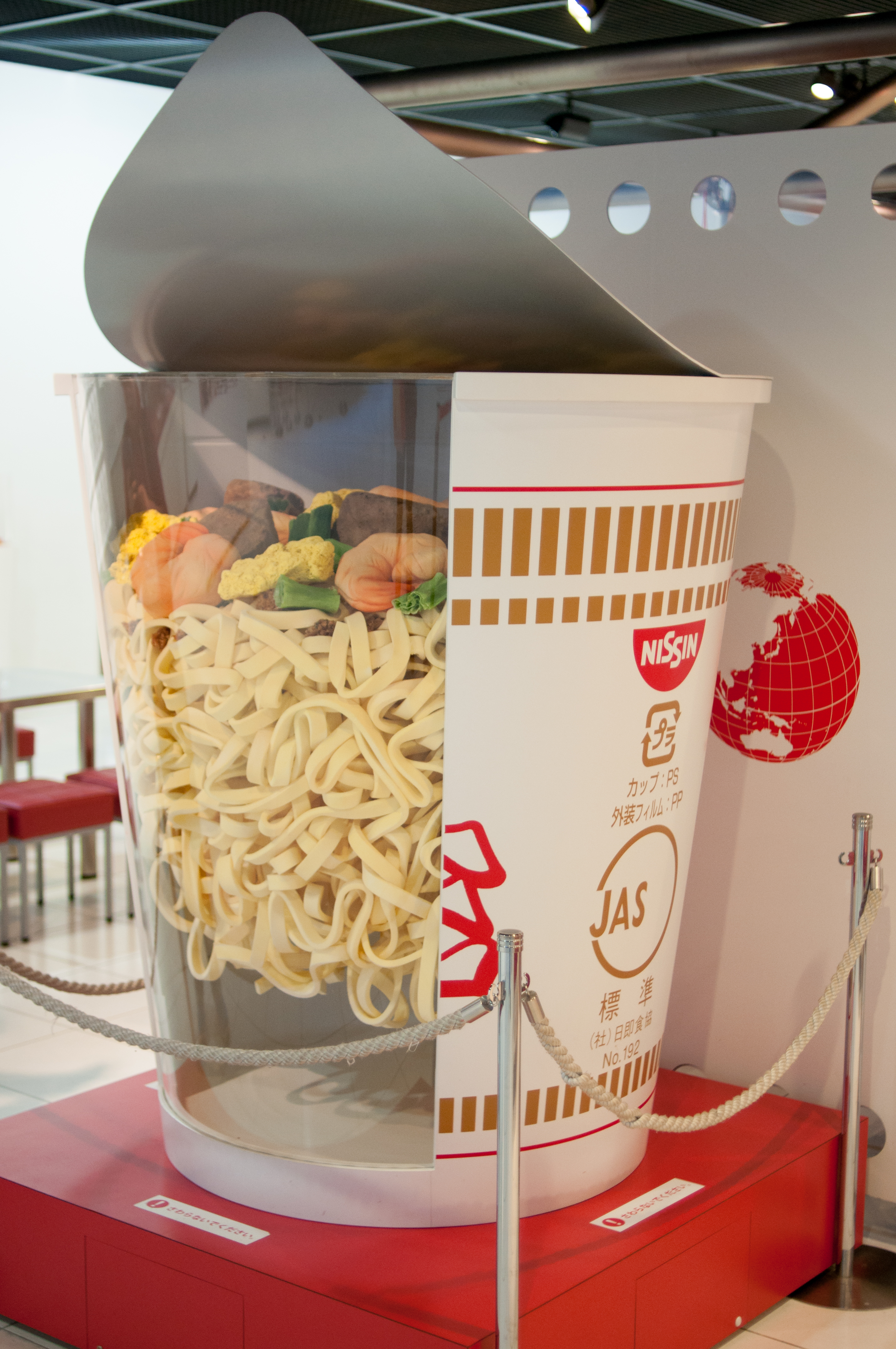

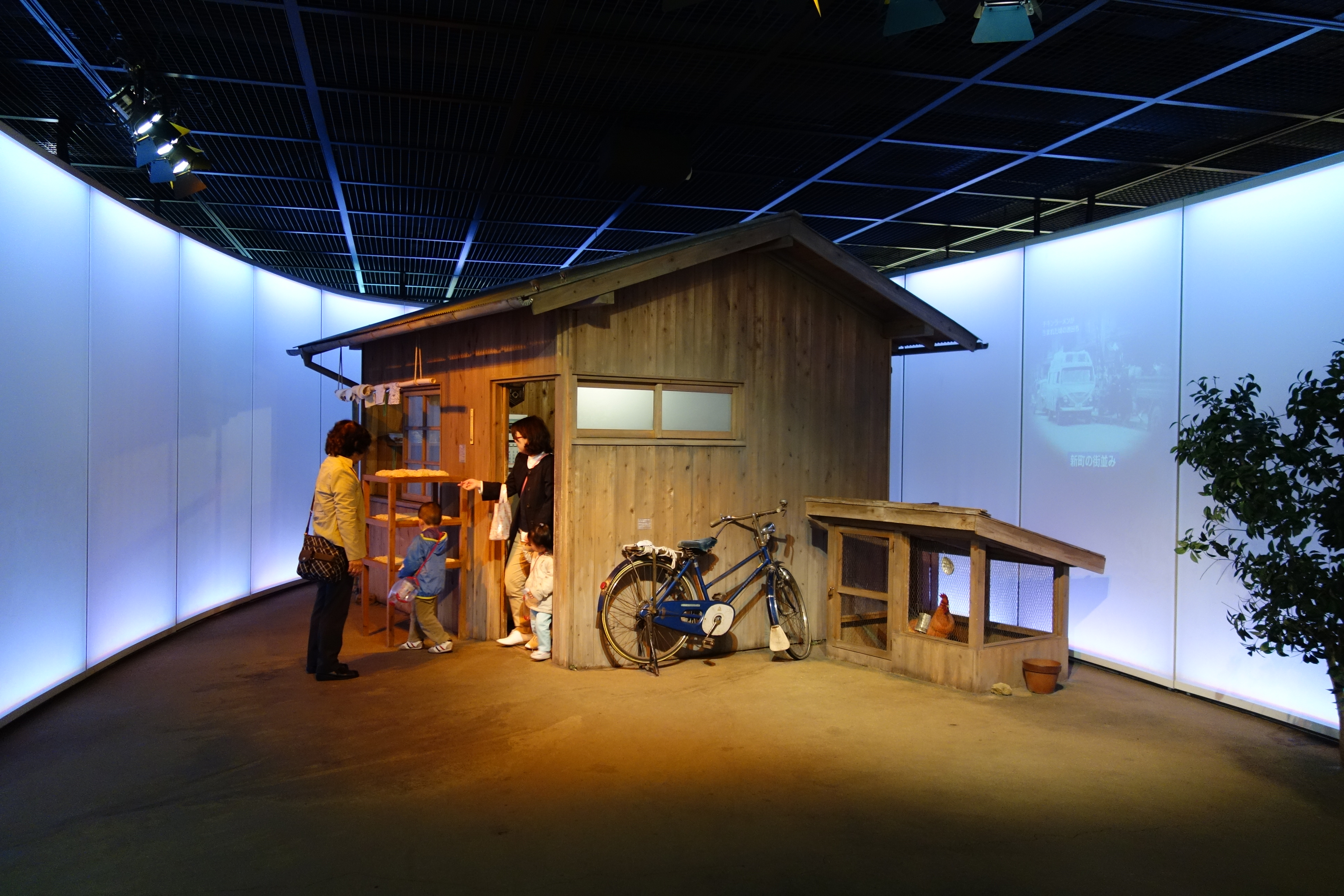

== See also ==
- List of museums in Japan
- CupNoodles Museum Yokohama
