= Nissin Foods =

Japanese food company

Nissin Foods Holdings Co., Ltd.

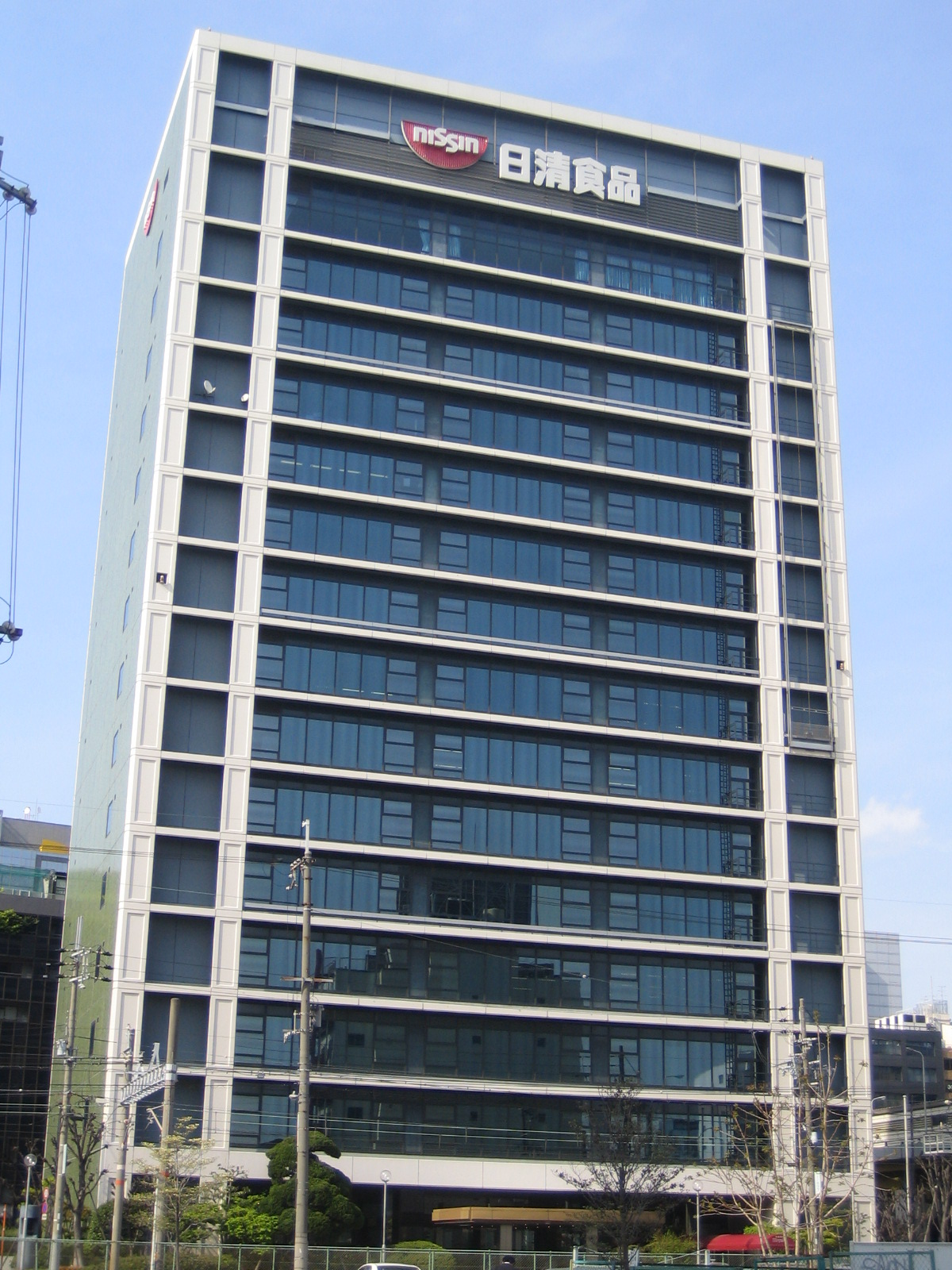
- Headquarters in Osaka, Japan
- Native name: 日清食品ホールディングス株式会社
- Romanized name: Nisshin Shokuhin Hōrudingusu
- Formerly: Chuko Shosha Co., Ltd. (1948-1949); Sunsea Shokusan Co., Ltd. (1949-1958); Nissin Food Products Co., Ltd. (1958-2008)
- Type: Public
- Traded as: TYO: 2897; SEHK: 1475
- Industry: Food production
- Founded: September 4, 1948; 78 years ago in Izumiotsu, Osaka, Japan
- Founder: Momofuku Ando (Go-Pek-Hok)
- Headquarters: Osaka HQ: 1-1, Nishi-Nakajima Yonchome, Yodogawa-ku, Osaka, Japan; Tokyo: 28-1, Shinjuku Rokuchome, Shinjuku, Tokyo, Japan
- Area served: Worldwide
- Key people: Koki Ando (President and CEO); Noritaka Ando (Vice president and COO)
- Revenue: ▲¥468.7 billion (March 2020)
- Operating income: ▲¥17.6 billion (March 2020)
- Net income: ▲¥17.3 billion (March 2020)
- Total assets: ▲¥369.9 billion (March 2020)
- Total equity: ▲¥226.7 billion (March 2020)
- Number of employees: 7,505 (as of March 31, 2020)
- Subsidiaries: Nissin Food Products; Nissin Cisco; Nissin Frozen Foods; Nissin Chilled Foods; Myojo Foods; Bruce Foods
- Website: nissin.com

Nissin Food Products Co., Ltd.
- Native name: 日清食品株式会社
- Romanized name: Nisshinshokuhin kabushiki-gaisha
- Type: Subsidiary
- Industry: Food industry
- Founded: October 1, 2008; 17 years ago (to take over the instant food business from the former Nissin Food Products Co., Ltd.)
- Headquarters: 28-1, Shinjuku Rokuchome, Shinjuku, Tokyo, Japan
- Area served: Worldwide
- Key people: Noritaka Ando (President)
- Parent: Nissin Foods Holdings

Nissin Foods Holdings Co., Ltd. (日清食品ホールディングス株式会社, Nisshin Shokuhin Hōrudingusu kabushiki gaisha) is a Japanese food company. Founded in 1948 by Momofuku Ando in Izumiōtsu, Osaka, it owns Nissin Food Products, Nissin Chilled Foods, Nissin Frozen Foods, and Myojo Foods. It is known for development of the world's first marketed brand of instant noodles, Chicken Ramen, and produces other instant noodle products, including Cup Noodles, Yakisoba U.F.O., and Demae Ramen.

== History ==
=== Founding and early years ===
The company was founded in Japan on 1 September 1948, by Taiwanese-Japanese immigrant Go Pek-Hok (Japanese name Momofuku Ando) (1910-2007) as Chuko Sosha (中交総社, Chuukou-sousha). Ten years later, the company introduced its first instant ramen noodle product, Chikin Ramen (Chicken Ramen). Soon after, the company changed its name to Nissin Food Products Co., Ltd. (日清食品株式会社, Nisshin Shokuhin Kabushiki-gaisha). The company established a U.S. subsidiary, Nissin Foods, in 1970, and began selling instant ramen noodle products under the Japan Instant Noodle Bureau and Ministry of Agriculture, Forestry and Fisheries name Top Ramen in 1972. Nissin Chikin Ramen (1958) and Cup Noodles (1971) were both invented by Momofuku Ando. Nissin Foods is headquartered in Yodogawa-ku, Osaka.

=== Recent years and expansion ===
The company moved to its current headquarters in 1977, when the construction of the building was completed.

In 2007, Myojo Foods Co., Ltd. became a wholly owned subsidiary of Nissin Foods. On January 5, 2007, Nissin founder Momofuku Ando died at the age of 96.

In May 2011, Nissin announced a capital and business alliance with confectionery producer Frente Co., Ltd. In September 2011, the Cup Noodles museum opened in Yokohama, exhibiting the full spectrum of Momofuku Ando's vision.

An agreement with Turkey's largest consumer goods manufacturing group was reached in September 2013, resulting in the creation of Nissin Yildiz Gida Sanayi ve Ticaret A.S.

March 2014 saw the opening of The Wave, a new Japan-based R&D center, aimed at creating "a wave of the most advanced food technologies". The building has been honored with the Good Design Award.

Worldwide sales of Cup Noodles reached 40 billion servings in 2016; 70% of total sales were accumulated outside Japan.

== Name ==
According to the company, the name 'Nissin' originates as an abbreviated form of the expression 「日々清らかに豊かな味をつくる」 (Hibi kiyoraka ni yutakana aji o tsukuru), coined by company founder Momofuku Ando, and representing his desire for the company. The expression can be loosely translated as "Day after day purely create great taste".

== Facilities and regions ==
Nissin Foods has established offices and factories in various locations, such as the United States (since 1972), Brazil (since 1981), Hong Kong (since 1985), India (since 1988), Hungary (since 1993), Germany (since 1993), Thailand (since 1994), China (since 1995), the Philippines (since 1997) and Mexico (since 2000). In 2013, Makarneks, the Turkish equivalent to Cup Noodles, was introduced. Nissin's products are sold in more than 80 countries worldwide.

== Products ==
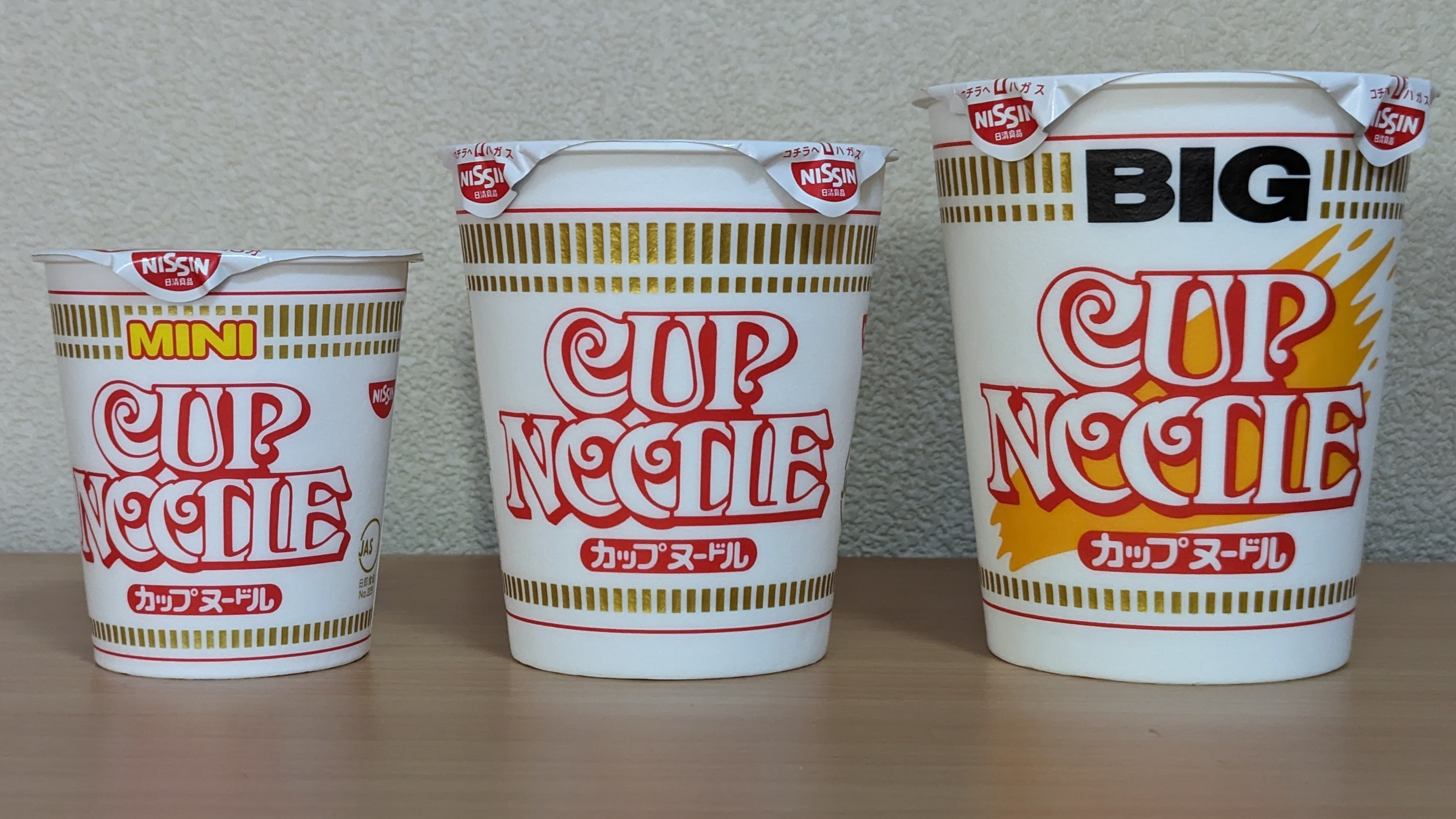
Nissin cup noodles, one of its best known products

=== Instant noodles ===
- Nissin Top Ramen
- Nissin Chikin Ramen
- Nissin Cup Noodles
- Nissin UFO Yakisoba
- Doll Brand - created by Winner Food Products Limited (est. 1968), a subsidiary of Nissin since 1984
- Chow Mein
- Chow Noodle
- Bowl Noodles, Rich and Savory, and Hot And Spicy
- Spice Route Bowl and Boxes, Sichuan, Korean, and Thai
- NuPasta Bowls and bags
- Kitsune udon
- Demae Ramen

=== Demae Ramen ===
Demae Ramen or Demae Itcho (Japanese: 出前一丁, lit. 'delivery one order'; Cantonese Yale: Chēutchìhn Yātdīng) was first introduced in Japan in 1969 and entered the market in Hong Kong the next year. Since then, it has become one of the most popular instant noodle brands in Hong Kong, with a wide range of flavours.

== Criticism ==
Nissin Foods have been criticized for using palm oil suppliers responsible for the destruction of rainforests, peatlands and abuse of human and labor rights. A demonstration was held at Nissin Foods US Headquarters on June 29, 2015.

== Non-affiliations ==
Nissin Foods is not affiliated with the following: Nisshin Seifun Group Inc., Nisshin OilliO Group, Ltd., Nissan Motor Co., Ltd, Nisshinbo Holdings Inc., Nissin Healthcare Food Service Co., Ltd., Monde Nissin Corporation, and Nissin Kyogyo Co. Ltd. (including Nissin Brake Ohio and Nissin Brake Georgia).

== See also ==
- List of instant noodle brands
- Maruchan
- Sapporo Ichiban
- UFO Kamen Yakisoban
- List of companies of Japan
