= Momofuku Ando =

Taiwanese-Japanese inventor and businessman (1910–2007)

- 安藤 百福
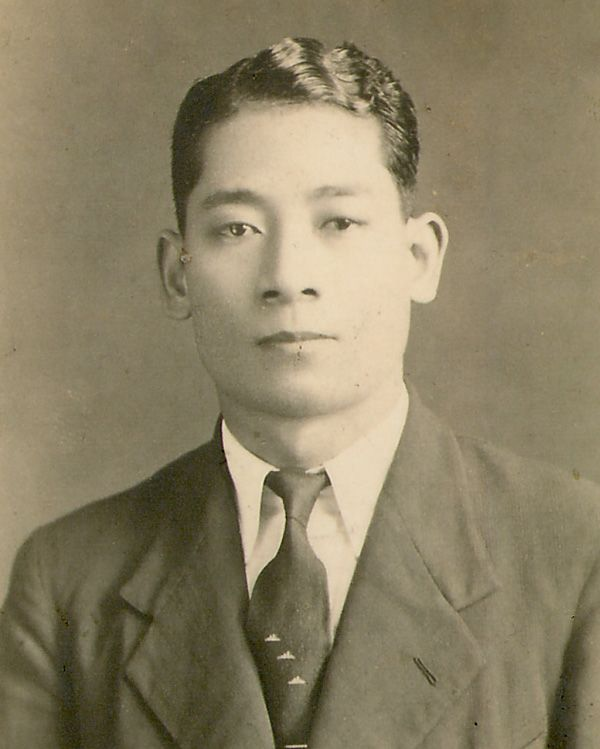
- Photograph of Ando, c. 1930
- Born: Go Pek-hok (吳百福); March 5, 1910; Chiayi, Japanese Taiwan (now Puzi, Chiayi County, Taiwan)
- Died: January 5, 2007 (aged 96); Ikeda, Osaka Prefecture, Japan
- Citizenship: Japanese (Taiwan under Japanese colonial rule) (1910–1945); Republic of China (1945–1966); Japanese (1966–2007)
- Education: Ritsumeikan University
- Known for: The invention of Nissin Chikin Ramens; Founder of the Nissin Food Products Co., Ltd.
- Spouse: Masako Ando
- Children: 3, including Koki

Chinese name
- Traditional Chinese: 吳百福
- Simplified Chinese: 吴百福
Transcriptions
Standard Mandarin
- Hanyu Pinyin: Wú Bǎifú
Hakka
- Romanization: Ǹg Pak-fuk
Southern Min
- Hokkien POJ: Gô͘ Peh-hok
- Tâi-lô: Gôo Pik-hok

Japanese name
- Kanji: 安藤 百福
- Hiragana: あんどう ももふく
- Katakana: アンドウ モモフク
Transcriptions
- Romanization: Andō Momofuku

Momofuku Ando (Japanese: 安藤 百福, Hepburn: Andō Momofuku; March 5, 1910 – January 5, 2007), born Go Pek-Hok (Chinese: 吳百福; Pe̍h-ōe-jī: Gô͘ Pek-hok; Tâi-lô: Gôo Pik-hok), was a Taiwanese-born, ethnic Chinese, Japanese inventor and businessman who founded Nissin Food Products Co., Ltd. He is known as the inventor of Nissin Chikin Ramen, the first brand of commercially available prepackaged instant noodles, and the creator of the brands Top Ramen and Cup Noodles.

== Early life and education ==
Ando was born Go Pek-Hok (Chinese: 吳百福; Pe̍h-ōe-jī: Gô͘ Pek-hok; Tâi-lô: Gôo Pik-hok) in 1910 into a wealthy family in Chiayi, Taiwan, when Taiwan was under Japanese colonial rule. He was raised by his grandparents within the city walls of Tainan following the deaths of his parents. His grandparents owned a small textiles store, which inspired him, at the age of 22, to start his own textiles company, using 190,000 yuan, in Daitōtei area in Taipei. In 1933, he traveled to Osaka, where he established a clothing company while studying economics at Ritsumeikan University.

== Career ==
=== Founding Nissin ===
Ando was convicted of tax evasion in 1948 and served two years in jail. In his biography, Ando said he had provided scholarships for students, which at the time was a form of tax evasion. After he lost his company due to a chain-reaction bankruptcy, Ando founded what was to become Nissin in Ikeda, Osaka, Japan, starting off as a small family-run company producing salt.

=== Invention of Nissin Chikin Ramen ===
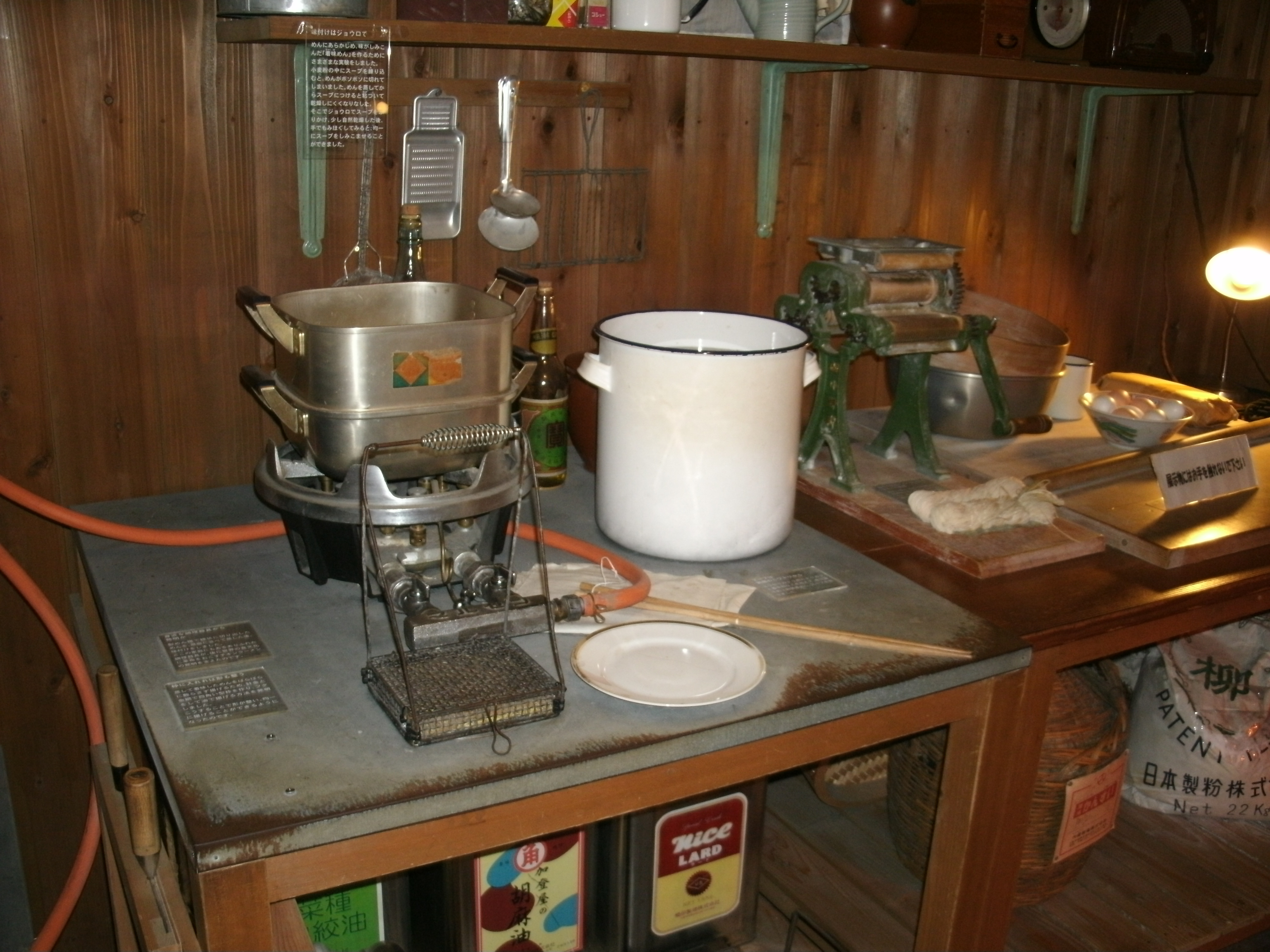
A recreation of Ando's Workshop at the Momofuku Andō Instant Ramen Museum

With Japan still suffering from a shortage of food in the post-war era, the Ministry of Health tried to encourage people to eat bread made from wheat flour that was supplied by the United States. Ando wondered why bread was recommended instead of noodles, which were more familiar to the Japanese. The Ministry's response was that noodle companies were too small and unstable to satisfy supply needs, so Ando decided to develop the production of noodles by himself. The experience convinced him that "Peace will come to the world when the people have enough to eat."

On August 25, 1958, at the age of 48, and after months of trial and error experimentation to perfect his flash-frying method, Ando marketed the first package of precooked instant noodles. The original chicken flavor is called Chikin Ramen. It was originally considered a luxury item, with its price of ¥35 (Note: US$0.10 in 1958, under the then-current exchange rate of 360 yen to the dollar. However, equivalent to ¥608 by 2021, or US$5.69 under the current exchange rate of US$1 to ¥106.775.) around six times that of traditional udon and soba noodles at the time. As of 2025, Chikin Ramen is still sold in Japan, and now retails for around ¥120 (US$0.77), or approximately one-third the price of the cheapest bowl of noodles in a Japanese restaurant.

=== Cup Noodles invention ===
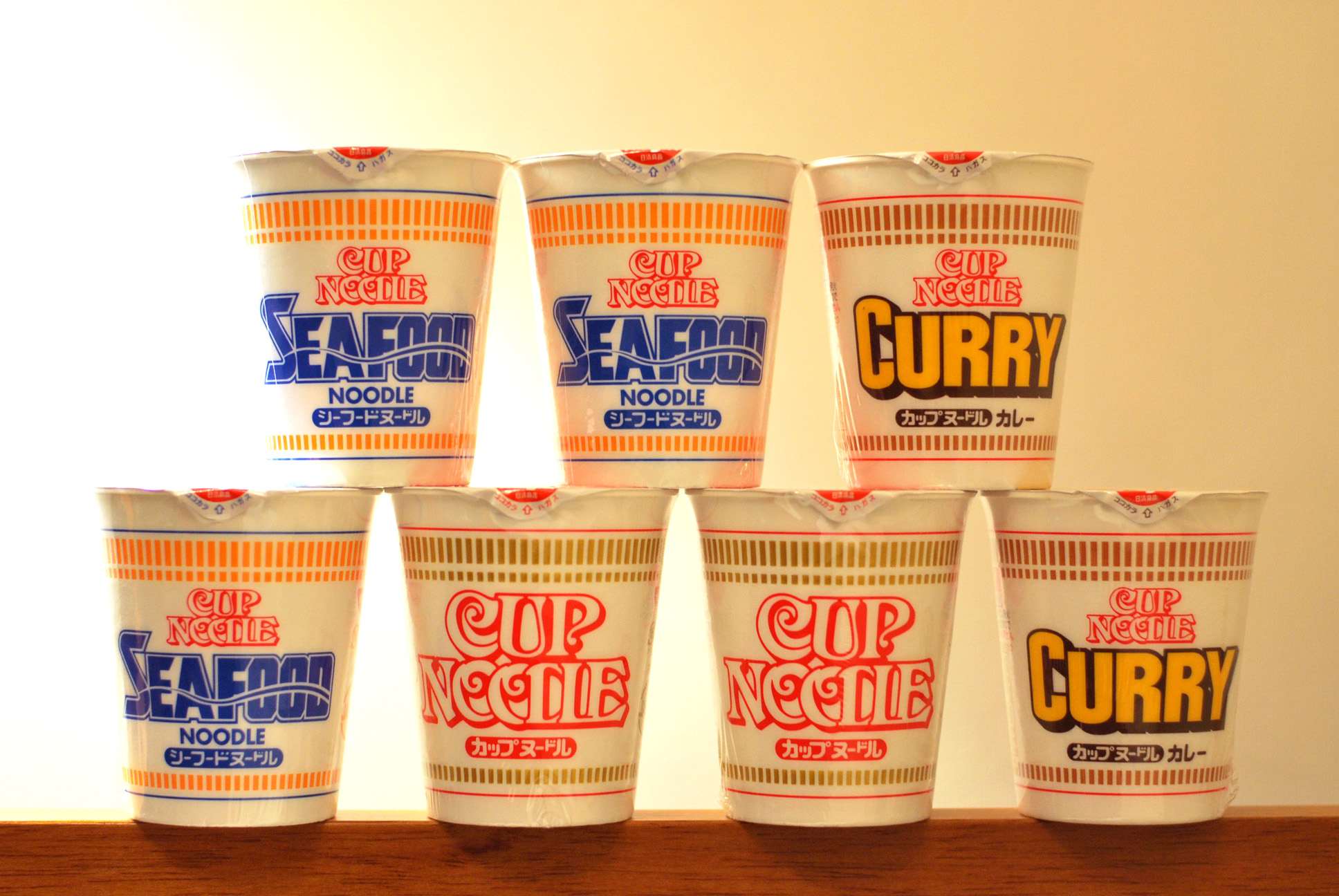
Nissin Cup Noodles (1971 ~)

According to The Financial Times, Ando's invention of Cup Noodles in 1971, at the age of 61, helped spark the popularity of instant noodles overseas. He had observed that Americans ate noodles by breaking the noodles in half, putting them into a paper cup, and pouring hot water over the noodles. They also ate them with a fork instead of chopsticks. Ando was inspired, and felt that a Styrofoam cup—with a narrower bottom than the top—would be the ideal vessel for holding noodles and keeping them warm. Eating the noodles would then be as easy as opening the lid, adding hot water and waiting. This simplicity, efficiency and low price of Cup Noodles went on to transform Nissin's fortunes.

Ando began the sales of his most famous product, Cup Noodle (カップヌードル, Kappu Nūdoru), on September 18, 1971, with the idea of providing a waterproof polystyrene container. As prices dropped, instant ramen soon became a booming business. Worldwide demand reached 98 billion servings in 2009.

In 1972, the Asama-Sansō hostage standoff took place in Nagano Prefecture, Japan. Widespread coverage of the event, which included repeated images of the prefectural Riot Police Unit eating the noodles on national television, have been conjectured as boosting awareness of the brand.

== Industry memberships ==
In 1964, seeking a way to promote the instant noodle industry, Ando founded the Instant Food Industry Association, which set guidelines for fair competition and product quality, introducing several industry standards such as the inclusion of production dates on packaging and the "fill to" line.

Ando also founded and became chairman of the International Ramen Manufacturers Association (IRMA) in 1997, later renamed to the World Instant Noodles Association (WINA), after seeing the need for greater oversight on instant noodles through a regulatory body.

== Personal life and death ==
After World War II, Japan surrendered colonies and territories it occupied during its imperial expansion, and Taiwan was received by the Republic of China (ROC). Ando had to choose between becoming an ROC citizen or remaining a Japanese subject. Ando chose the former in order to keep his ancestral properties on the island, as all Japanese nationals had to forfeit their properties in Taiwan.

Nevertheless, in 1966, Ando naturalized through marriage and became a Japanese citizen. "Momofuku" is the Japanese pronunciation of his given name (百福; Pek-hok), while Andō (安藤) is the surname of his Japanese wife.

Ando died of heart failure on January 5, 2007, at a hospital in Ikeda, Osaka Prefecture, at the age of 96.

Ando was survived by his wife Masako, two sons and a daughter. Ando claimed that the secret of his long life was playing golf and eating chicken ramen almost every day. He was said to have eaten instant ramen until the day he died.

== Legacy ==
=== Commemoration ===
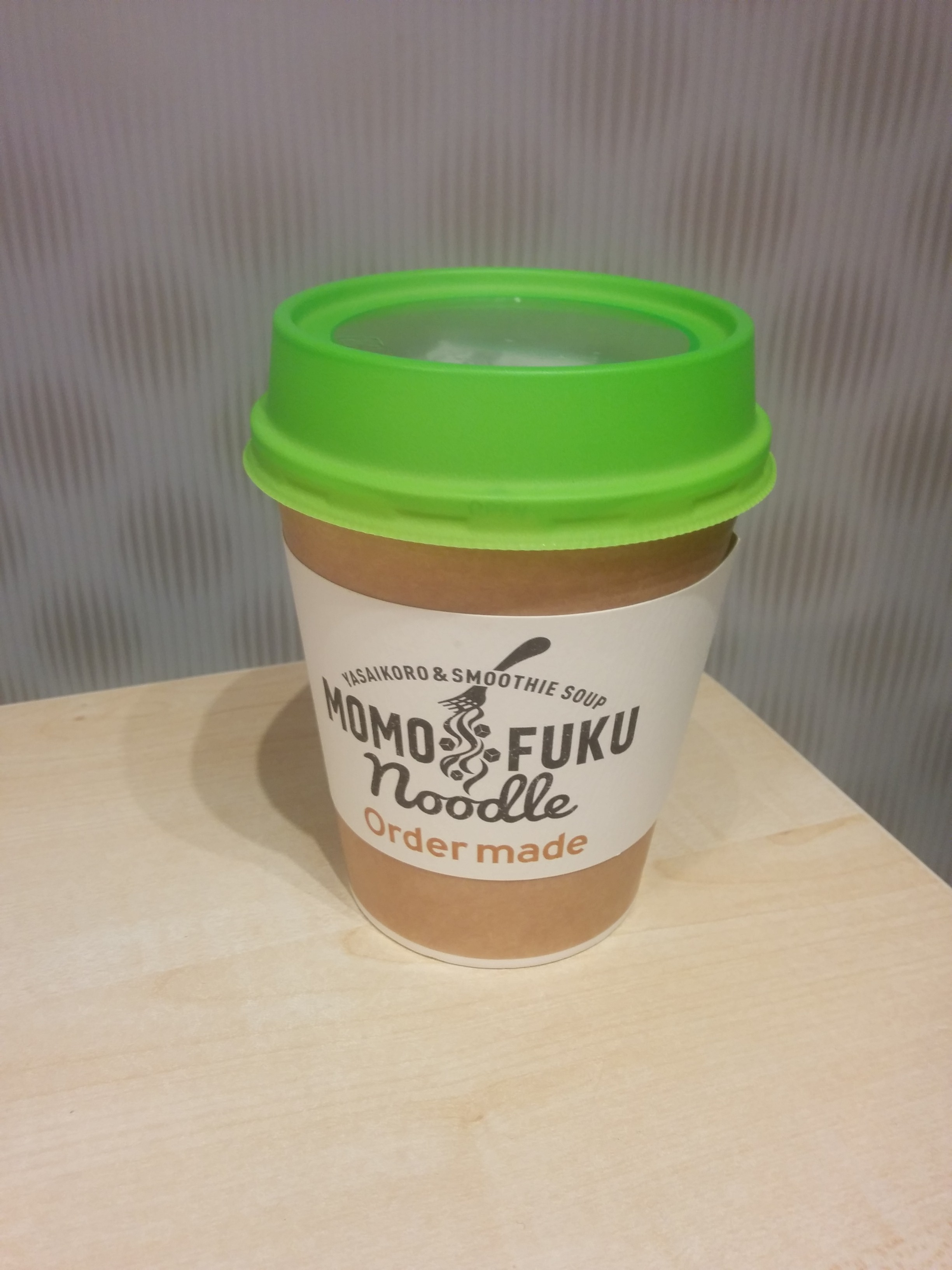
"MOMOFUKU Noodle", by NISSIN

On April 8, 2008, a ramen summit was held in Osaka and a bronze statue of Ando was unveiled at the Momofuku Ando Instant Ramen Museum in Ikeda, Osaka Prefecture. The statue depicts Ando standing atop a base resembling a noodle container while holding a packet of instant noodles in his right hand. Yasuhiro Nakasone (former Prime Minister of Japan) and Masako Ando (Ando's wife) attended the unveiling ceremony.

On October 1, 2008, the company's name was changed to "NISSIN FOODS HOLDINGS". At the same time, Nissin Foods Products Co., Ltd was founded. In the same year, Project Hyakufukusi was started.

On March 5, 2015, Google placed a doodle created by Google artist Sophie Diao on its main web page commemorating Ando's birthday.

The name of the Momofuku restaurants in the United States alludes to Momofuku Ando.

=== Honors ===
Ando was repeatedly honored with medals by the Japanese government and the emperor—including The Order of the Rising Sun, Gold and Silver Star, Second Class—in 2002, which is the second-most prestigious Japanese decoration for Japanese civilians.

- Medal of Honor with Blue Ribbon (1977)
- Order of the Sacred Treasure, Second Class, Gold and Silver Star (1982)
- Medal of Honor with Purple Ribbon (1983)
- Director-General of the Science and Technology Agency "Distinguished Service Award" (1992)
- Order of the Rising Sun, Second Class, Gold and Silver Star (2002)

==== Foreign decoration ====
- Order of the Direkgunabhorn of Thailand, Fourth Clastas, (2001)

==== Order of precedence ====
- Senior fourth rank (2007, posthumous)

== See also ==
- List of instant noodle brands
- List of inventors
- Manpuku
