= Nissin Chikin Ramen =

Japanese instant noodle brand

Chicken Ramen
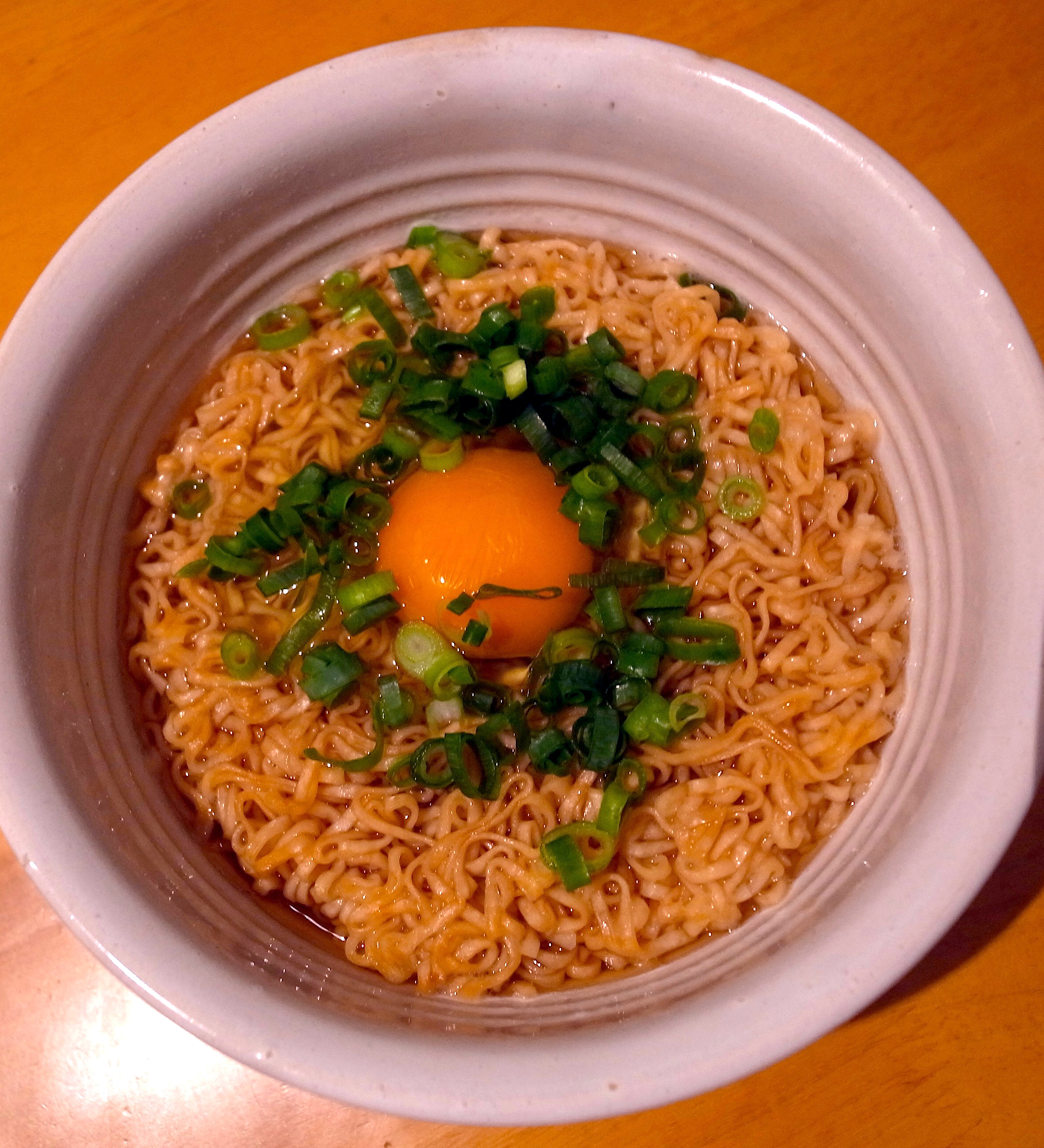
- A bowl of Nissin Chikin Ramen with serving suggestion of green onions and a raw egg in the center
- Produced by: Nissin Foods
- Introduced: 1958

Nissin Chikin Ramen (日清チキンラーメン, Nisshin Chikin Rāmen), or Nissin Chicken Ramen, is a noodle brand and the first marketed brand of Japanese instant noodles produced by Nissin Foods since 1958. It was invented by Momofuku Ando after he learned how to cook tempura in his house in Ikeda, Osaka.

The product is sold in Japan with small amounts exported overseas by distributors.

== History ==
Instant noodles were invented by and were first marketed by Taiwanese-Japanese inventor and businessman Momofuku Ando on 25 August 1958 by Ando's company, Nissin, under the brand name Chikin Ramen. Ando developed the production method of flash frying noodles after they had been made, creating the "instant" noodle. This dried the noodles and gave them a longer shelf life, even exceeding that of frozen noodles. Each noodle block was pre-seasoned and sold for 35 yen. Initially, due to its price and novelty, Chikin Ramen was considered a luxury item, as Japanese grocery stores typically sold fresh noodles for one-sixth their price. Despite this, instant noodles eventually gained immense popularity, especially after being promoted by Mitsubishi Corporation.

== Description ==
Unlike Nissin's other noodles, the ramen does not have seasoning packets but flavoring contained within the noodle itself.

== Gallery ==
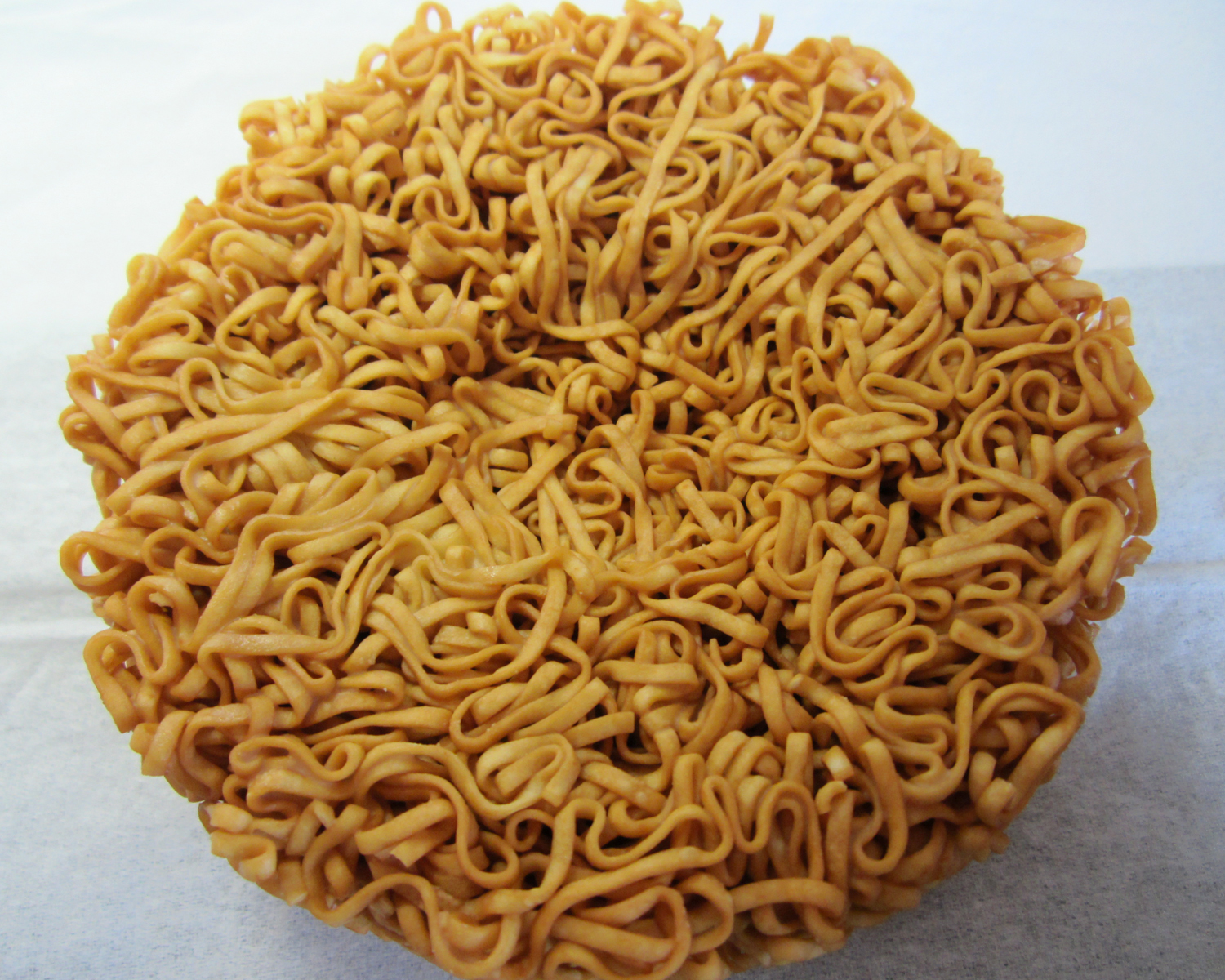
The product unpackaged

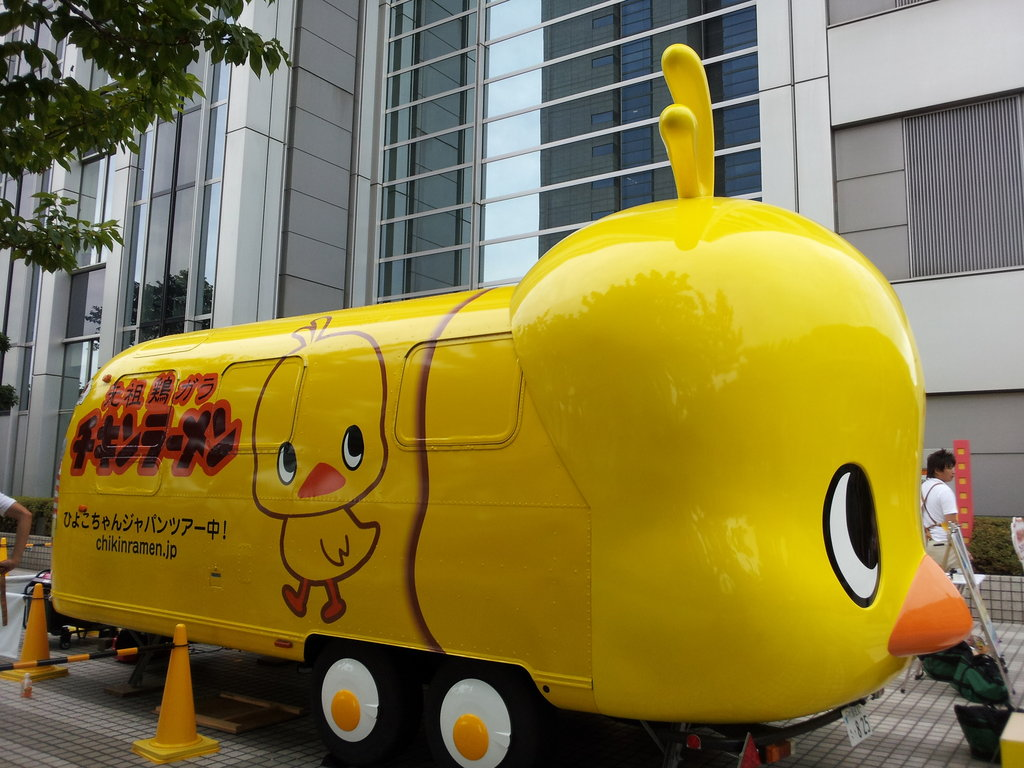
A promotional vehicle for the product

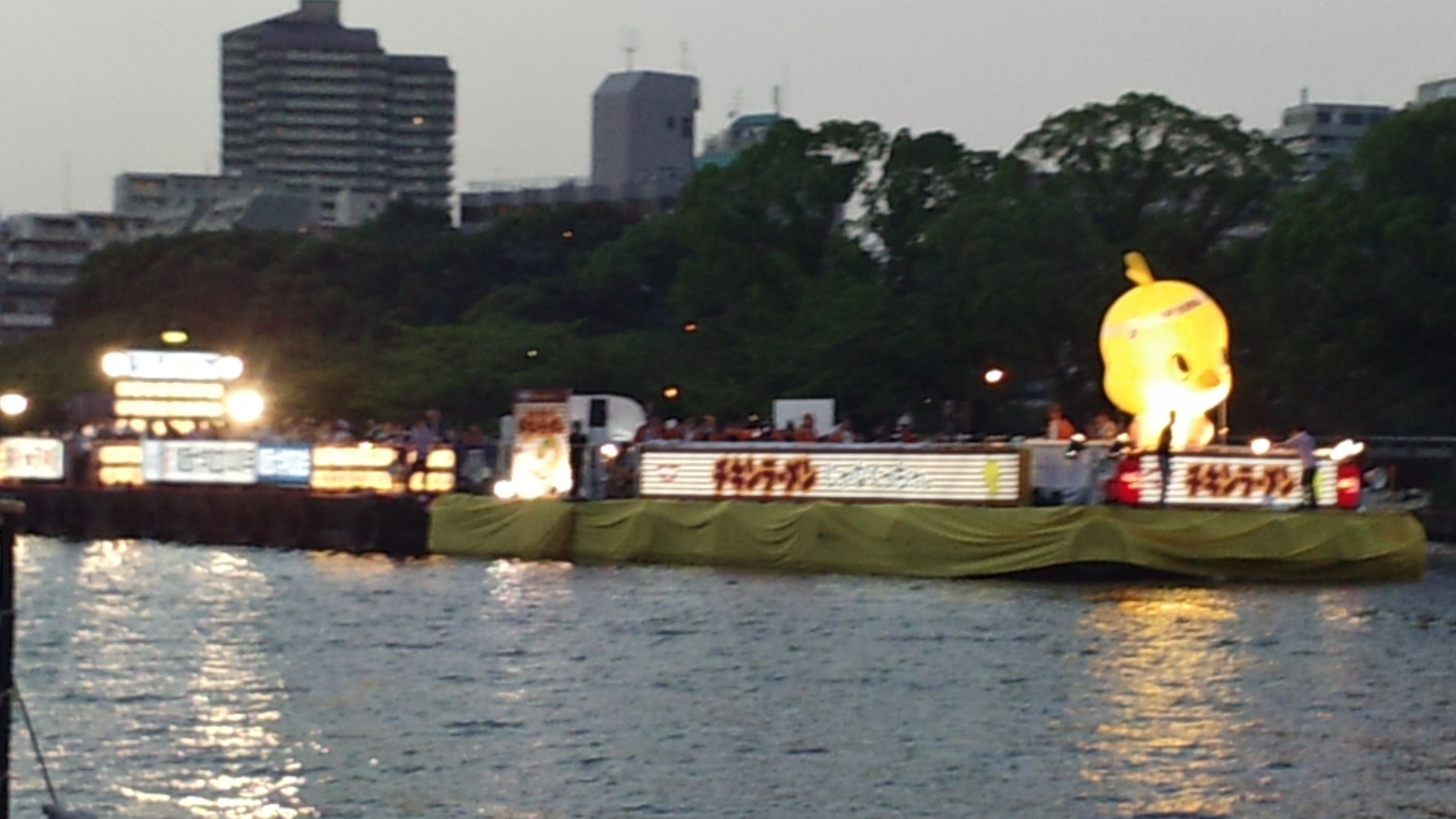
Chicken Ramen mascot on a parade float in 2014

== See also ==
- List of noodles
- List of instant noodle brands
