= Cup Noodles =

Japanese brand of instant ramen noodles

Nissin Cup Noodles
- Global Cup Noodles branding

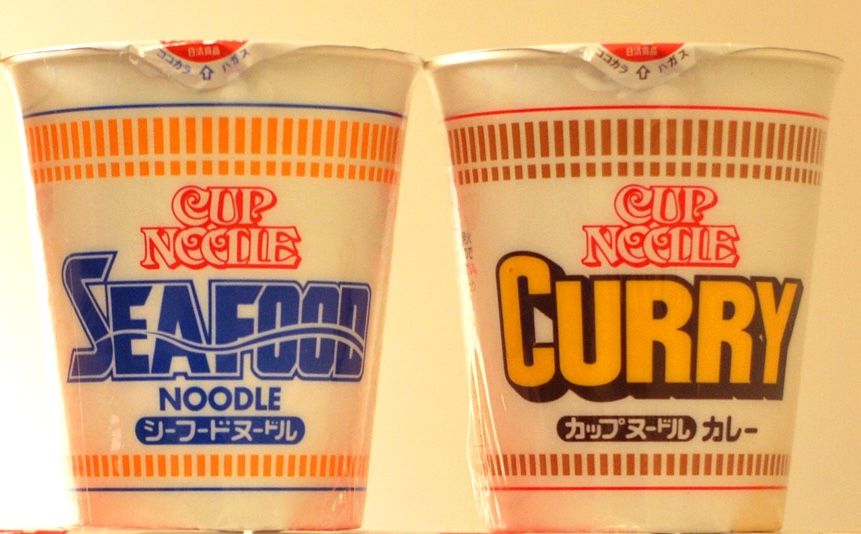
- Two flavors of Cup Noodles
- Product type: Instant noodle
- Current owner: Nissin Foods
- Produced by: Nissin Foods
- Country: Japan
- Introduced: 1971; 55 years ago
- Markets: Worldwide
- Registered as a trademark in: Nissin Cup Noodles, Cup Noodle
- Website: cupnoodle.jp

Cup Noodles (カップヌードル, Kappu Nūdoru) is the original brand of cup noodle (i.e., instant ramen in a disposable cup) that was developed in 1971 and manufactured by Japanese food company Nissin Foods. Single servings of the product are packaged in foam, plastic, or paper cups and prepared simply by adding boiling water.

The product name was originally Cup O' Noodles, before being renamed in 1993. The singular brand name Cup Noodle is also a registered trademark of Nissin Foods. In some countries, such as Japan, the singular form Cup Noodle is used. The product has inspired various competing products, such as Maruchan's Instant Lunch.

== History ==
Instant noodles were invented in 1958 by Momofuku Ando, the Taiwan-born (when Taiwan was under Japanese rule) founder of the Japanese food company Nissin. He called Chickin Ramen the first instant ramen noodles in history.

In 1970, Nissin formed the subsidiary Nissin Foods (USA) Co. Inc., to sell instant noodles in the United States and opened a factory in Lancaster, Pennsylvania in 1973. Nissin recognized that the bowls traditionally used to package instant noodles in Asia were not common in the US, so the paper cup was designed by Ron R. Matteson. In 1971, Nissin introduced instant ramen packaged in a foam cup. The three original flavors in the US were beef, chicken, and shrimp; pork flavor was added in 1976. All flavors originally contained pieces of dehydrated egg which was removed in the early 1980s. In 1978, Nissin Foods offered more new varieties of Top Ramen and Cup O' Noodles. Japan Airlines has offered Cup Noodle with the exclusive de Sky flavor on board since 1992, and since 2021 the product has been available in the airline's online store. The product was known as Cup O' Noodles in the United States until 1993. (Note: It is still mistakenly called Cup O' Noodles.) In 1998, Cup Noodles Hot Sauce Varieties were introduced (Beef, Chicken, Pork, and Shrimp).

=== Today ===
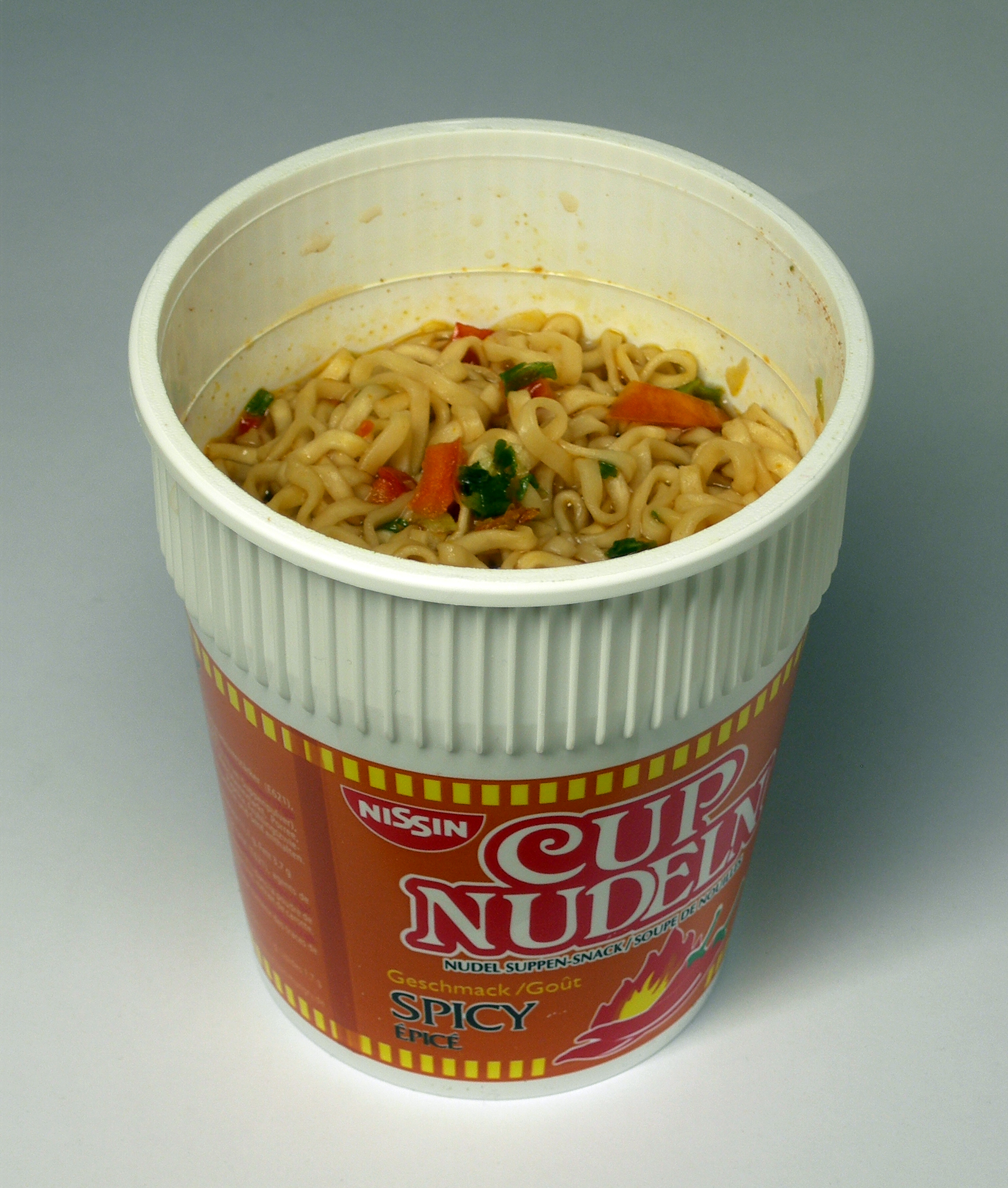
German Cup Nudeln (Spicy flavor), old packaging

Today, instant noodles in Japan are often sold in foam bowls, sometimes with plastic utensils. Foam bowls are inexpensive, disposable, light, and easy to hold, since they insulate heat well. Different flavors are available in other parts of the world, such as tom yum in Thailand, curry in Japan, crab in Hong Kong, and churrasco in Brazil.

In 2016 the US version was changed, reducing sodium and removing MSG and artificial flavors.

In 2026, Nissin announced a new variety of Cup Noodles designed to be prepared using cold water and eaten cold, available initially in kimchi and chicken flavors.

== In popular culture ==
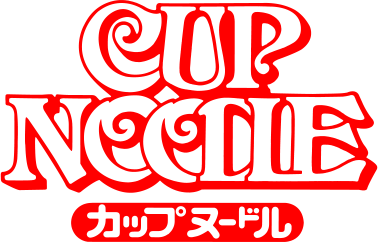
Japanese market branding

From 1996 to 2006, a 60-foot (18 m) Nissin Cup Noodle sign was installed in Times Square, New York City. It was located prominently near the top of the One Times Square building, the location of the Times Square Ball drop on New Year's Eve. The sign was the most recent example in a tradition of steaming signs in Times Square, which started with an A&P 8 O'Clock Coffee cup in 1933.

In 2006, a manga book was published about the invention of the cup noodle and the founder of the Nissin Cup Noodle brand, Project X: Nissin Cup Noodle by author Tadashi Katoh and artist Akira Imai (publisher: Digital Manga, ISBN 9781569709597). The book was nominated for an Eisner Award for Best Reality-Based Work in 2007.

Cup Noodles are often seen in the 2012 video game Binary Domain, which is set in a futuristic version of Tokyo. It is commonly seen in billboards and advertisements throughout the city, and is even seen being eaten by some characters. Cup Noodles were also prominently featured as product placement in the 2016 video game Final Fantasy XV. This partnership also resulted in a crossover TV ad in Japan.

The popularity of Cup Noodles has also resulted in the creation of a Cup Noodle Museum. The museum features displays on cup noodles and their founder, Momofuku Ando. The museum is located in both Yokohama and Osaka, Japan, with the Museum also launched in Hong Kong following the stint on My Cup Noodles Factory at the Hong Kong International Airport.

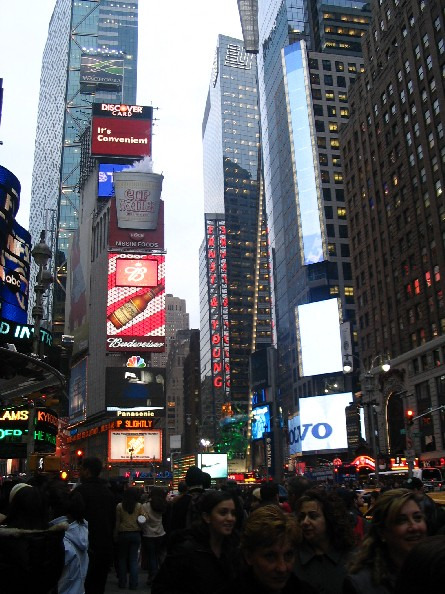
The Cup Noodles advertisement at One Times Square

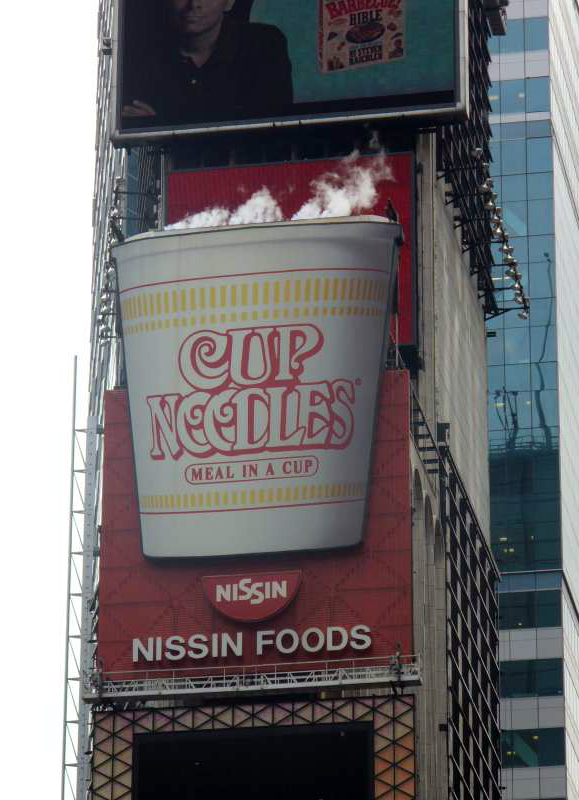
Close-up of the Times Square advertisement. Note the actual steam rising from the cup.

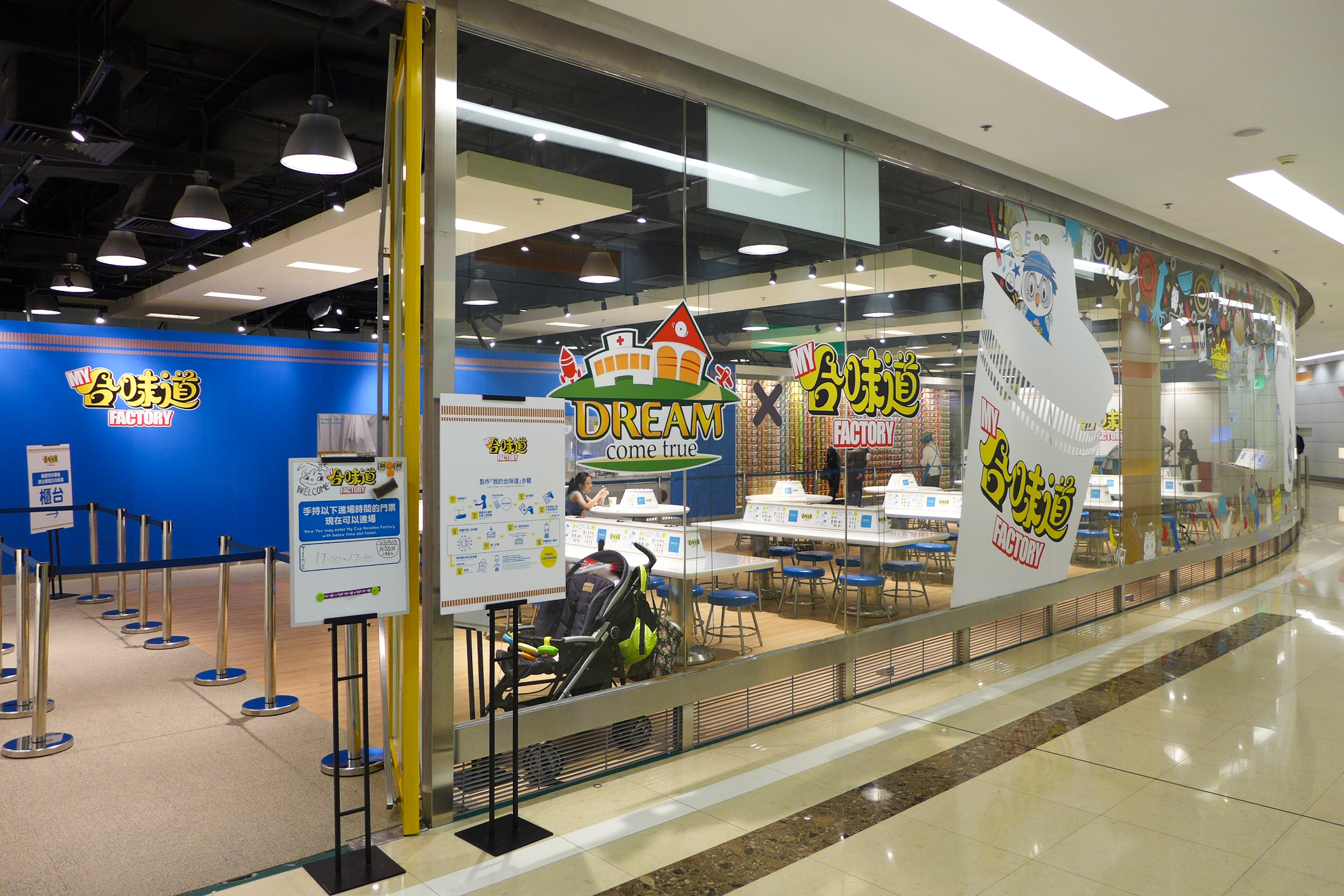
My Cup Noodles Factory in Hong Kong International Airport SkyPlaza

In 2018, Manpuku was broadcast in Japan. The television drama series documented Momofuku Ando and his wife Masako's lives, including the invention of instant noodles and cup noodles. It is the 99th Asadora series. It premiered on NHK on 1 October 2018, and concluded on 30 March 2019.

== Flavors ==
As of 2021, there were 17 flavors of Cup Noodles. However, a total of 21 have been observed for sale in 2023: Artificial Chicken, Beef, Black Pepper Crab, Chicken, Crab, Curry, Fiery Korean Chicken, Hot and Spicy Shrimp, Japanese Teriyaki Chicken, Korean BBQ, Korean Spicy Beef, Original, Seafood, Shrimp, Spicy Chili Chicken, Spicy Lime Shrimp, Sweet Chili, Teriyaki Beef, Teriyaki Chicken, Thai Yellow Curry, and Tom Yum Seafood.

== See also ==
- Frozen noodles
- Kimiko Kasai
- List of instant noodle brands
- Pot Noodle
- Sapporo Ichiban
- Shin Ramyun
