= Instant noodles =

Noodles sold in a precooked and dried block with flavoring

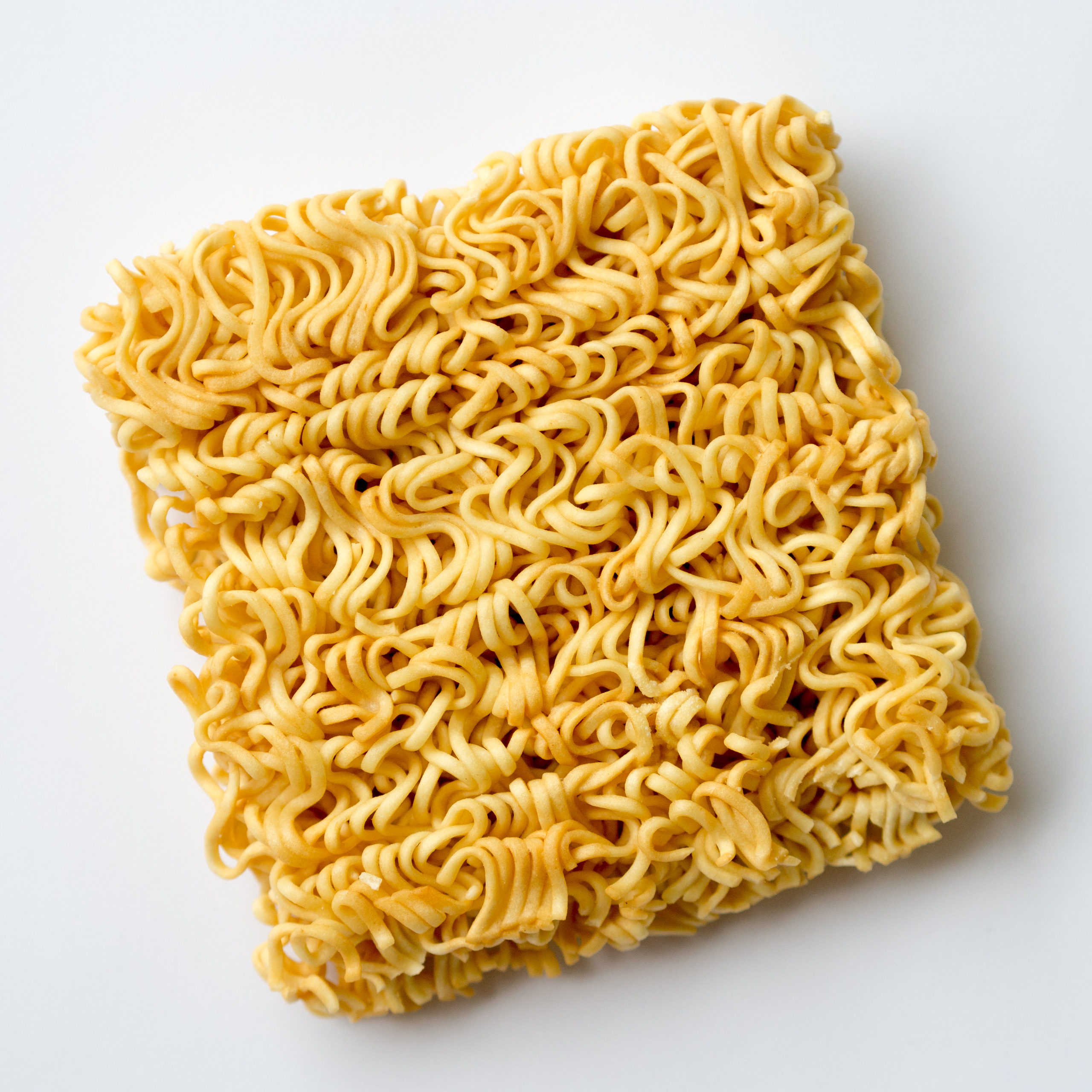
- Instant noodles in typical dried block form
- Type: Noodle
- Place of origin: Japan
- Region or state: Originally East Asia, Southeast Asia, and South Asia, now found in most parts of the world
- Created by: Momofuku Ando
- Invented: 1958; 68 years ago
- Main ingredients: Dried or precooked noodle, seasoning

Instant noodles, or instant ramen, is a type of food consisting of noodles sold in a precooked and dried block with flavoring powder and/or seasoning oil. The dried noodle block was originally created by flash-frying cooked noodles, which is still the dominant method used in Asian countries; air-dried noodle blocks are favored in Western countries. Dried noodle blocks are designed to be cooked or soaked in boiling water before eating. Ramen, a Japanese adaptation of Chinese noodle soup, is sometimes used as a descriptor for instant noodle flavors by some Japanese manufacturers. It has become synonymous in the United States with all instant noodle products.

Instant noodles were invented by Momofuku Ando of Nissin Foods in Japan. They were launched in 1958 under the brand name Chikin Ramen. In the 1960s, they became popular in the United States, and a subsidiary of Nissin Foods was established there. In 1971, Nissin introduced Cup Noodles, the first cup noodle product. Instant noodles are marketed worldwide under many brand names.

The main ingredients in instant noodles are flour, starch, water, salt and/or kansui (かん水), a type of alkaline mineral water containing sodium carbonate and usually potassium carbonate, and sometimes a small amount of phosphoric acid. Common ingredients in the flavoring powder are salt, monosodium glutamate, seasoning, and sugar. The flavoring is typically in a separate packet. In cup noodles, flavoring powder is often loose in the cup. Some instant noodle products are seal-packed and can be reheated or eaten straight from the packet or container.

== History ==
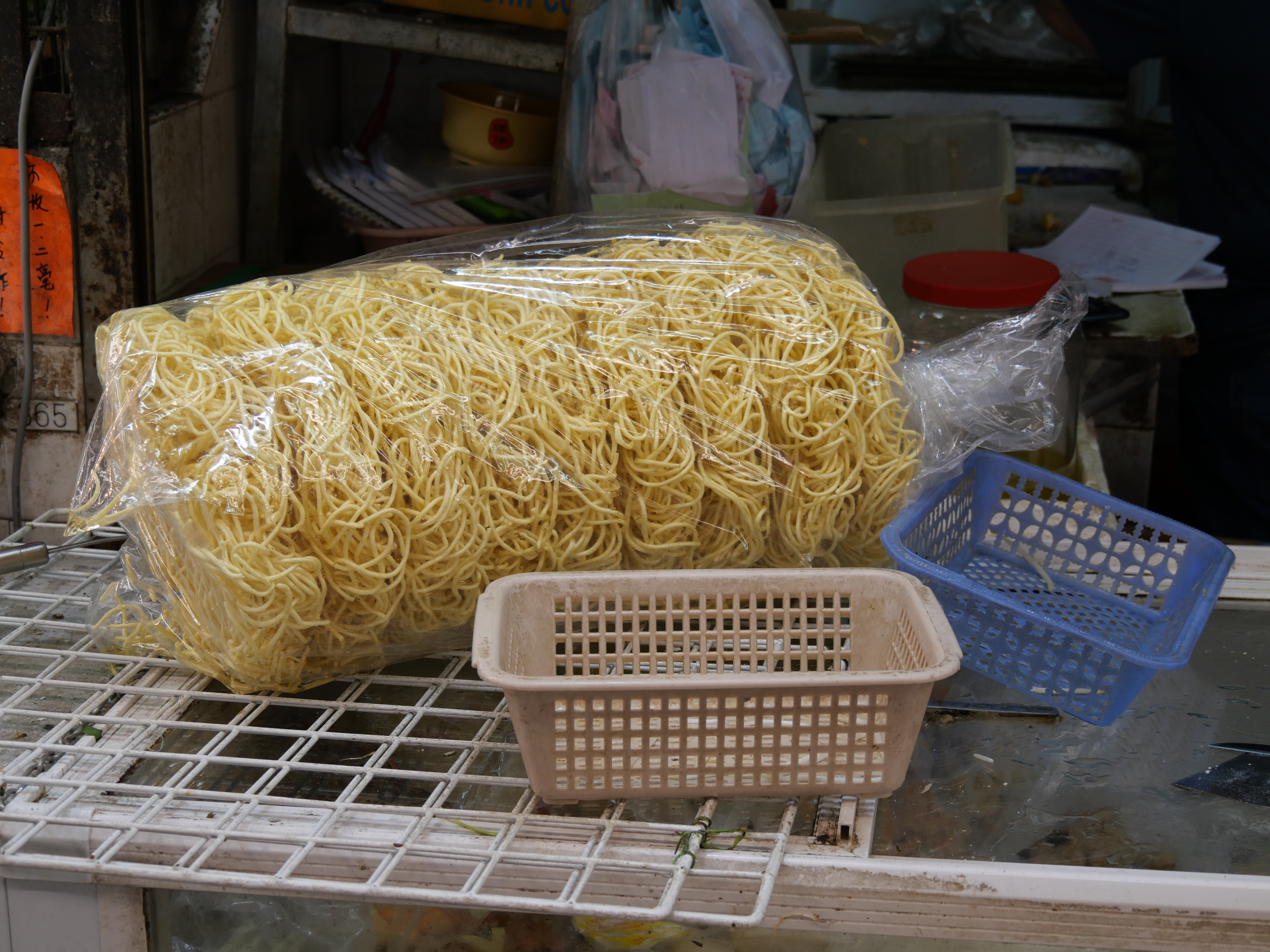
A bag of Chinese pre-fried Yi noodles

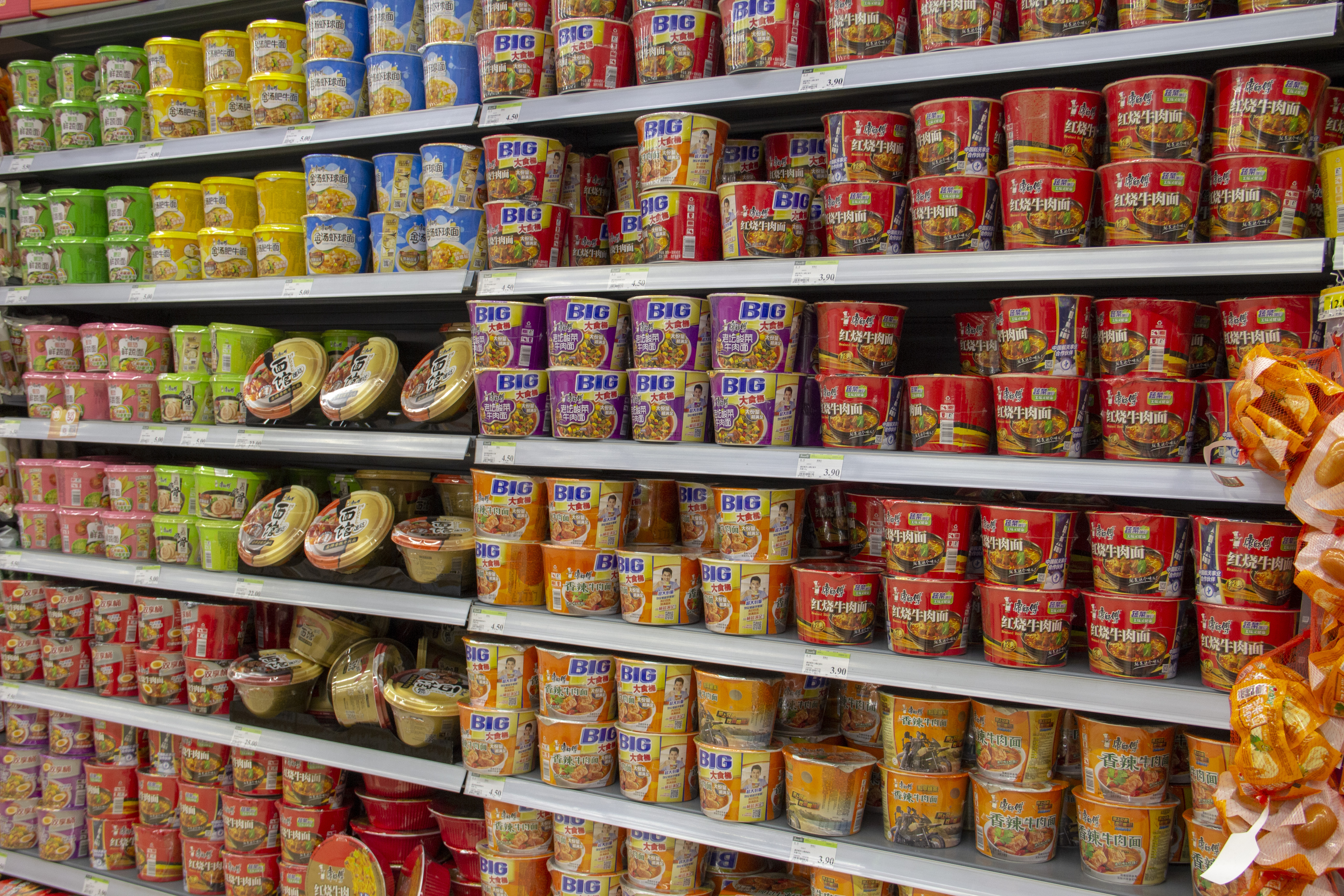
Instant noodles on a shelf

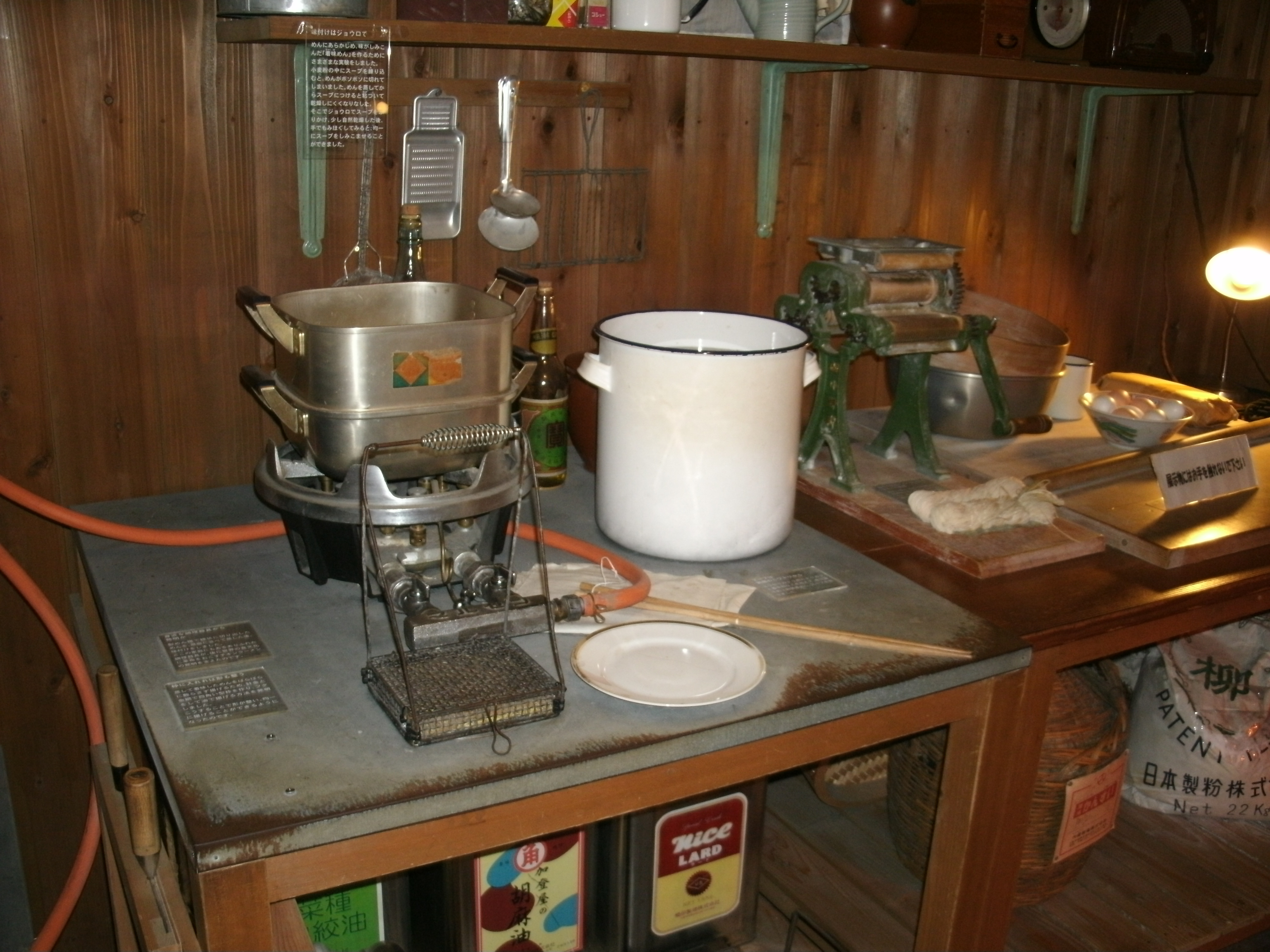
Recreation of Momofuku Ando's workshop, where he created instant noodles; CupNoodles Museum Osaka Ikeda

The history of noodles in China dates back many centuries, and there is evidence that a noodle that is boiled and then fried and served in a soup, similar to Yi noodle, dates to ancient China. According to legend, during the Qing dynasty, a chef put already-cooked egg noodles in to boil. To rescue them from becoming soggy, he scooped them out and fried them in hot oil, serving them as a soup. According to the Journal of Ethnic Foods, early instant noodle packaging was labeled "Yi noodles".

Modern instant noodles were created by Momofuku Ando in Japan. They were first marketed on 25 August 1958 by Ando's company, Nissin, under the brand name Chikin Ramen.

Before Ando invented instant noodles, the process of mechanically curving noodles into a wavy shape had already been invented by Yoshio Murata in 1953. Murata's invention made it possible to curl noodles dozens of times faster, paving the way for the mass production of instant noodles. Curving noodles into a wave shape presents numerous advantages, including more noodles fitting into a small package, lower likelihood of sticking together during cooking, more even cooking, improved flavor, lower fragility during transport and handling, easier malleability, improved elasticity, and decreased likelihood of slipping off chopsticks or forks during consumption.

Ando developed the entire production method of creating "instant" noodles, from the processes of noodle-making, steaming, and seasoning, to dehydrating through flash-frying in hot oil. This dried the noodles and gave them a longer shelf life, exceeding that of frozen noodles. Each noodle block was pre-seasoned and sold for ¥35. The instant noodles became ready to eat in two minutes by adding boiling water. Due to their price and novelty, Chikin Ramen were considered a luxury item initially, as Japanese grocery stores typically sold fresh noodles for one-sixth of their price. Despite this, instant noodles eventually gained immense popularity, especially after being promoted by Mitsubishi Corporation. Initially gaining popularity across East, South, and Southeast Asia, where they are now firmly embedded within local cultures, instant noodles eventually spread to and gained popularity across most other parts of the world.

A separate claim of origin for instant noodles comes from Pingtung County in Taiwan. Chang Kuo-wen, a Pingtung local, filed a patent for instant noodles in 1956. On 16 August 1961, Zhang supposedly transferred the patent to Momofuku Ando for ¥23 million.

In 1966, when Ando was in the United States promoting Chikin Ramen, he observed how Americans would divide up a ramen block, put it in a paper cup, and pour boiling water over it, inspiring him with the idea for his new product. In 1971, Nissin introduced Nissin Cup Noodles, a cup noodle to which boiling water is added to cook the noodles. Dried vegetables began to be included in the cup, creating a complete instant soup dish. Cup noodles combine the functions of packaging material, a container for adding boiling water, and a bowl to eat the noodles from. Heading off the recent rise in health consciousness, many manufacturers launched instant noodles with various healthy recipes: noodles with dietary fiber and collagen, low-calorie noodles, and low-sodium noodles.

In a Japanese poll conducted in 2000, instant noodles were voted the best Japanese invention of the 20th century. As of 2018, approximately 103 billion servings of instant noodles were eaten worldwide every year. China consumed 40 billion packages of instant noodles per year (39% of world consumption), Indonesia 12 billion, India 6 billion, Japan 5.7 billion, and Vietnam 5.2 billion. The top three per-capita consuming nations are South Korea (74.6 servings), Vietnam (53.9 servings), and Nepal (53 servings).

== Composition ==
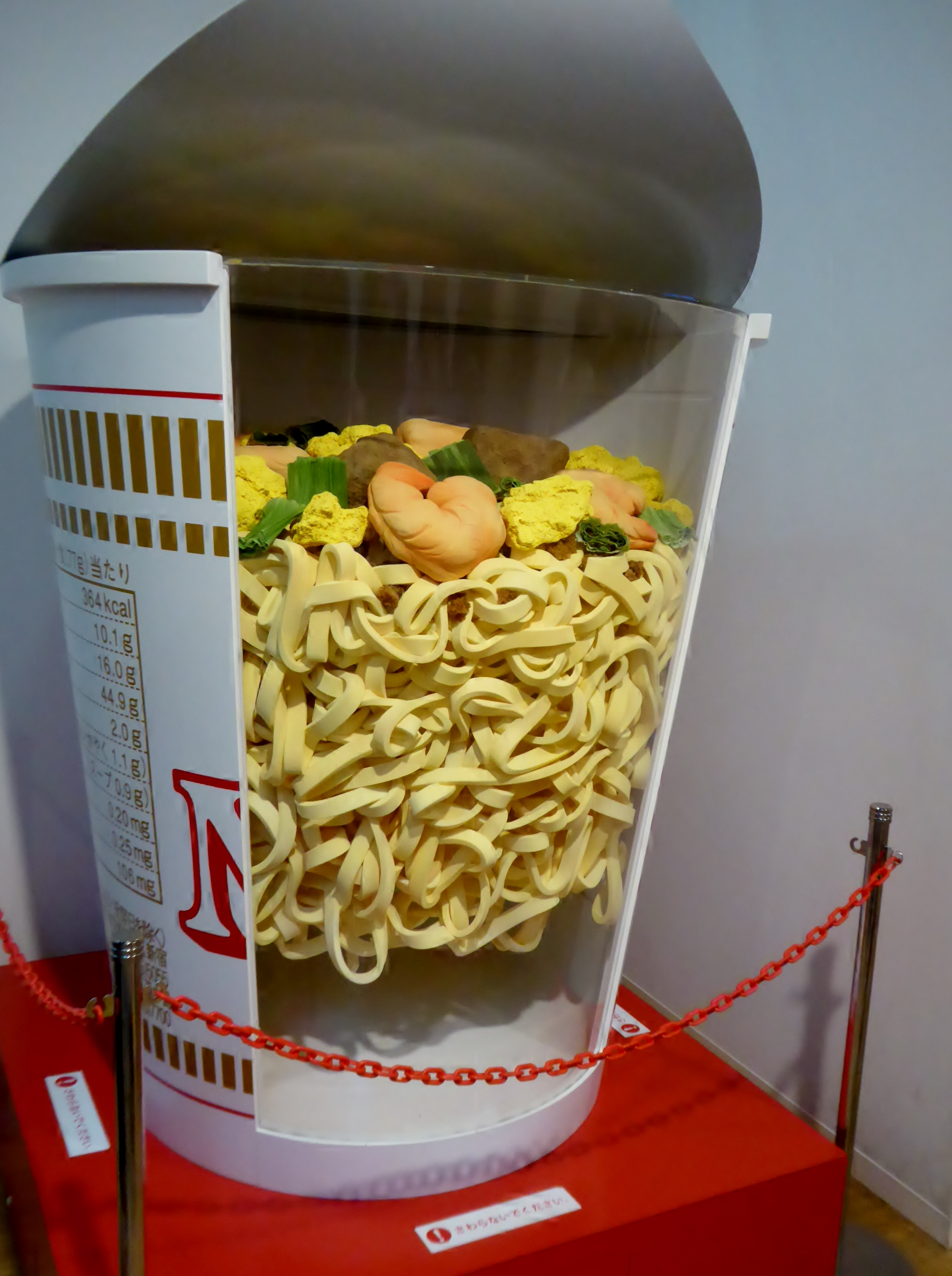
A model of cup instant noodle composition

There are three key ingredients in wheat-based noodles: wheat flour, water, and salt. Other than the three main ingredients, USDA regulations allow instant noodles to contain palm oil, seasoning, sodium phosphates, potato starches, gums, and other ingredients.

Flour
Noodles can be made from different kinds of flours, such as wheat, rice, and buckwheat flour. For instant noodles, flours that have 8.5–12.5% protein are optimal because noodles must be able to withstand the drying process without breaking apart, which requires a higher amount of protein in flour, and during frying, high protein content can help decrease the fat uptake. Gluten, which is made up of glutenin and gliadin, is the most important wheat protein that forms the continuous viscoelastic dough of noodles.
Water
The hydration of dough determines the development of gluten structure, which affects the viscoelastic properties of dough. The water absorption level for making noodles is about 30%–38% of flour weight; if the water absorption level is too high, hydration of flour cannot be completed, and if the water absorption level is too low, the dough will be too sticky to handle during processing. For instant noodles, dehydration is an important step after noodles are made because water can offer a hospitable environment for microorganisms. The USDA uses different regulations of moisture content, depending on dehydration method: for instant noodles dehydrated by frying, moisture content cannot exceed 8%, and for those dehydrated by methods other than frying, moisture content cannot exceed 14.5%.
Salt
Salt is added when making the flour dough to strengthen gluten structures and enhance the sheeting properties of dough, and it can make the noodles softer and more elastic. Salt also offers the basic salty flavor of noodles and can mask flavours generated by flour and processing. Another function of salt is to slow down the activities of enzymes, such as proteolytic enzymes, which could interrupt the gluten structures and microbial growth. Alkaline salt, such as sodium and potassium carbonates, could be added to noodle dough to enhance the yellow color of the product if needed because flavonoid pigments in flour turn yellow at alkaline pH levels, and the increase of pH could also influence the behavior of gluten, which could make noodle dough even tougher and less extensible (for some noodles, such as Japanese ramen, this is wanted). For making fresh noodles, the amount of salt added is 1–3% of flour weight, but instant noodles require higher salt content due to their longer shelf life. One pack of ramen contains well over half the daily recommended amount of sodium.
Kansui
Kansui (かん水), an alkaline solution consisting usually of a 9:1 ratio of sodium carbonate to potassium carbonate, is added to the flour and water when making ramen to help develop several of its unique characteristics. The addition of kansui aids in the gluten development of the noodle as well as promotion of gelatinization of starches, both of which contribute to the springiness and chewiness characteristic of ramen. Additionally, the addition of kansui enhances the yellow color of ramen noodles by bringing about a chromophoric shift of several compounds called flavonoids that are inherent in wheat flour.
Oil
Frying is a common dehydration process for producing instant noodles. According to USDA regulations, oil-fried instant noodles should not have a combined fat content of ingredients and frying higher than 20% of total weight. Palm oil is chosen as the frying oil for instant noodles due to its heat stability and low cost. Due to their high fat and low moisture content, instant noodles are susceptible to lipid oxidation, and relatively high amounts of antioxidant preservatives, such as TBHQ, are added.
Hence, to avoid the generation of off-flavors and health-risking compounds, some instant noodles are dehydrated by ways other than frying to reduce fat content. According to the USDA, non-fried instant noodles should have a fat content lower than 3%.
Other ingredients
Potato starches are commonly added to instant noodles to enhance the gelling properties and water-holding capacities of noodles. Polyphosphate is used in instant noodles as an additive to improve starch gelatinization during cooking (rehydration), to allow more water retention in the noodles. Hydrocolloids such as guar gum are widely used in instant noodle production to enhance water-binding capacity during rehydration and to shorten cooking time. Gums are dispersed in water before mixing and making of noodles dough.

== Production ==
Noodle production starts with dissolving the salt, starch, and flavoring in water to form a mixture that is then added to the flour. The dough is then left for a period of time to mature, then for even distribution of the ingredients and hydration of the particles in the dough, it is kneaded. After it is kneaded, the dough is made into two sheets compounded into one single noodle belt by being put through two rotating rollers. This process is repeated to develop gluten more easily as the sheet is folded and passed through the rollers several times. This will create the stringy and chewy texture found in instant noodles. When the noodle belt is made to the desired thickness by adjusting the gap in the rolls, it is then cut right away. Wavy noodles are made in a slow-paced conveyor belt and are hindered by metal weights when coming out of the slitter, which gives the noodle its wavy appearance. If the strands are to be molded into other shapes, liquid seasoning can be added as well. Once the noodles are shaped, they are ready to be steamed for 1–5 minutes at 100 °C (212 °F) to improve texture by gelatinizing the starch of the noodles. When steaming, the addition of water and heat breaks up the helix structure and crystallinity of amylose. Amylose begins to diffuse out of the starch granule and forms a gel matrix around the granule.

Noodles can be dried by frying or using hot air. Fried instant noodles are dried by oil frying for 1–2 minutes at a temperature of 140–160 °C (284–320 °F). The frying process decreases the moisture content from 30–50% to 2–5%. Common oils used for frying in North America include canola, cottonseed, and palm oil mixtures, while only palm oil or palm olein are used in Asia. Air-dried noodles are dried for 30–40 minutes in hot air at a temperature of 70–90 °C (158–194 °F), resulting in a moisture content of 8–12%. During the drying process, the rapid evaporation of water creates pores throughout the food matrix, which allows for short cooking times in the finished product. In the case of fried noodles, the creation of pores is directly related to the uptake of fat into the noodles. More than 80% of instant noodles are fried as this creates more evenly dried noodles than hot-air drying, which can cause an undesired texture in finished noodles and also takes longer to cook. However, with fried noodles, the oil content is about 15–20% and decreases the shelf life of the noodles due to oxidation, whereas in hot-air dried noodles, oil content does not go above 3%.

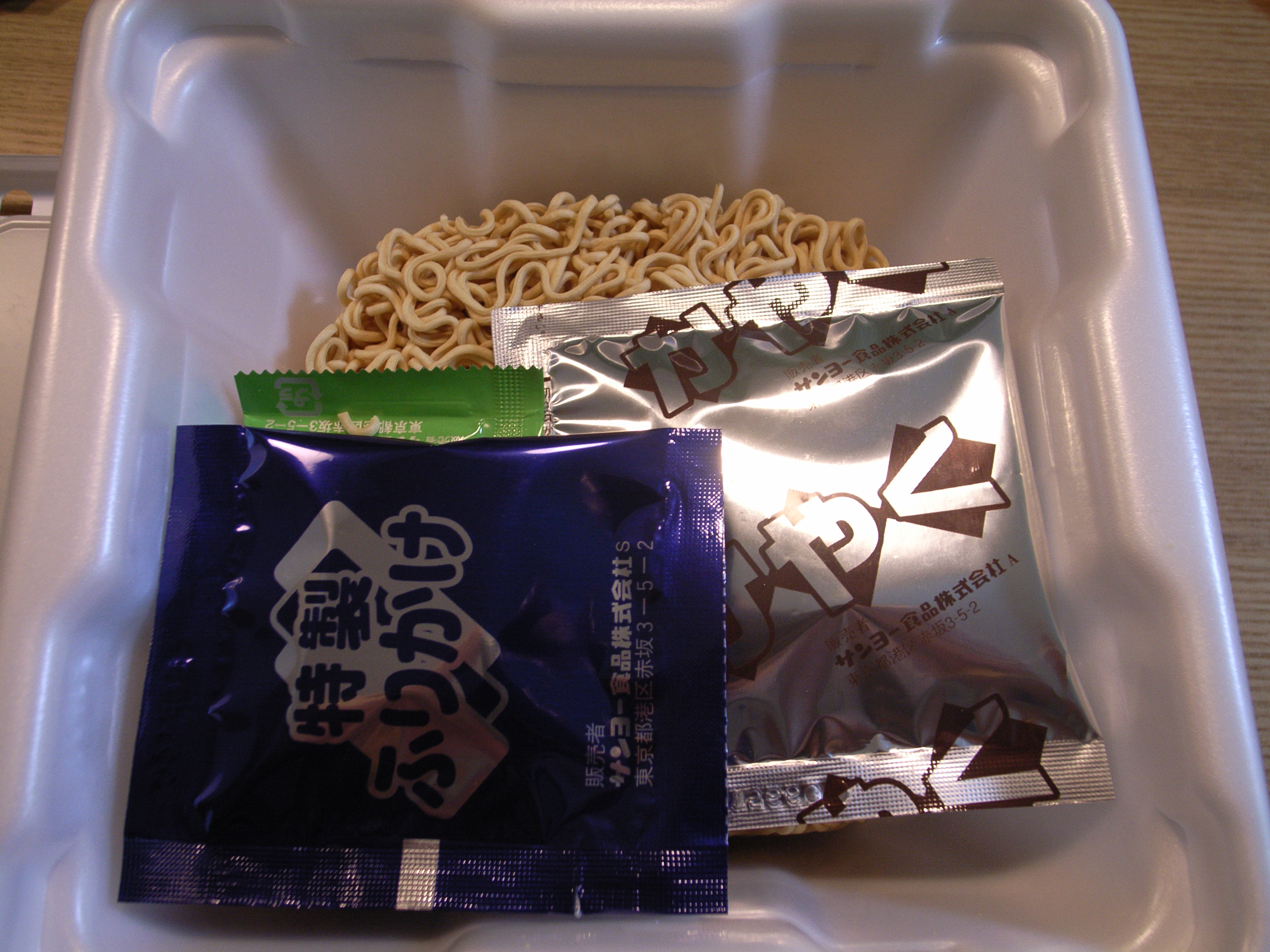
Seasoning sachets on instant noodles, the content of a Japanese instant yakisoba package

The noodles are cooled after drying, and their moisture, color, and shape are checked. Packaging includes films impermeable to air and water. There are two forms of packaged instant noodles: one with the provided seasoning in small sachets inside, and the other with seasoning on top of the noodles, which often include additional soy protein and dehydrated vegetables and meats. Common seasoning flavors include soy, beef, chicken, pork, shrimp, etc.

The shelf life of instant noodles ranges from 4–12 months, depending on the method of production and environmental factors. Their stability comes from the high sodium content with low moisture, and low water activity. Instant noodles can be served after 1–2 minutes in boiled water or soaked in hot water for 3–4 minutes.

== Physical properties ==
Although dry instant noodles may not appear elastic, they generally have higher elasticity than other types of noodles once they are cooked. The characteristic wavy form also differentiates instant noodles from other common noodles, such as udon or flat noodles. This wavy form is created when noodle dough sheets are being cut by rotation slitters. Due to the difference in velocity between the conveyor belt and blade rotation, noodle dough sheets can be pressed by blades multiple times within a certain area, creating the wavy form of instant noodles. During pressing by the heavy blades, the continuous gluten structure is ruptured at certain points and does not return to its original shape, but the remaining gluten structures are strong enough to keep it hanging; therefore, wavy noodle strands are formed and maintained during processing. Other than the physical springiness, the selection of ingredients also ensures high elasticity of instant noodles. Instant noodles require wheat flour with high protein content to ensure noodle strands are broken during processing, resulting in more viscoelastic noodle dough and thus more elastic noodles. Furthermore, potato starch, a key ingredient in instant noodles, has the important characteristics of low gelatinization temperature, high viscosity, and rapid swelling. Therefore, the addition of starch could further increase the elasticity of noodles. High salt content in instant noodles also increases the elasticity of noodle strands as its dissolved ions strengthen the interaction between gluten structures.

The initial purpose of inventing instant noodles was to shorten the cooking time of conventional noodles, which is their distinguishing characteristic. Instant noodles are cooked in boiled water; therefore, enhancing water retention is the main method of shortening cooking time. Starch gelatinization is the most important feature in instant noodles that can enhance water retention during cooking. The two key steps that serve the function to trigger starch gelatinization are steaming and oil-frying. Starch gelatinization occurs when starch granules swell in water with heat, amyloses leak out of starch granules, and these can bind to water and increase the viscosity of the gluten matrix. Steaming offers an optimal condition for the gelatinization of potato starches. After steaming, rapid oil-frying vaporizes the free water, and gelatinization continues until most of the free water evaporates. During frying, water in noodle strands migrates from the central region outwards to replace the surface water that is evaporated during frying. Therefore, a porous sponge structure in the noodle is created due to vaporization. During its migration, the water carries thermal energy from oil to the surroundings, creating heat for completing the starch gelatinization. Furthermore, the heat transfer during evaporation protects instant noodles from burning or being overcooked during frying. Moreover, as a common additive, guar gum can not only increase the elasticity and viscosity of noodles to enhance mouthfeel, it can also increase the water binding ability of noodles during cooking.

== Health and nutrition ==
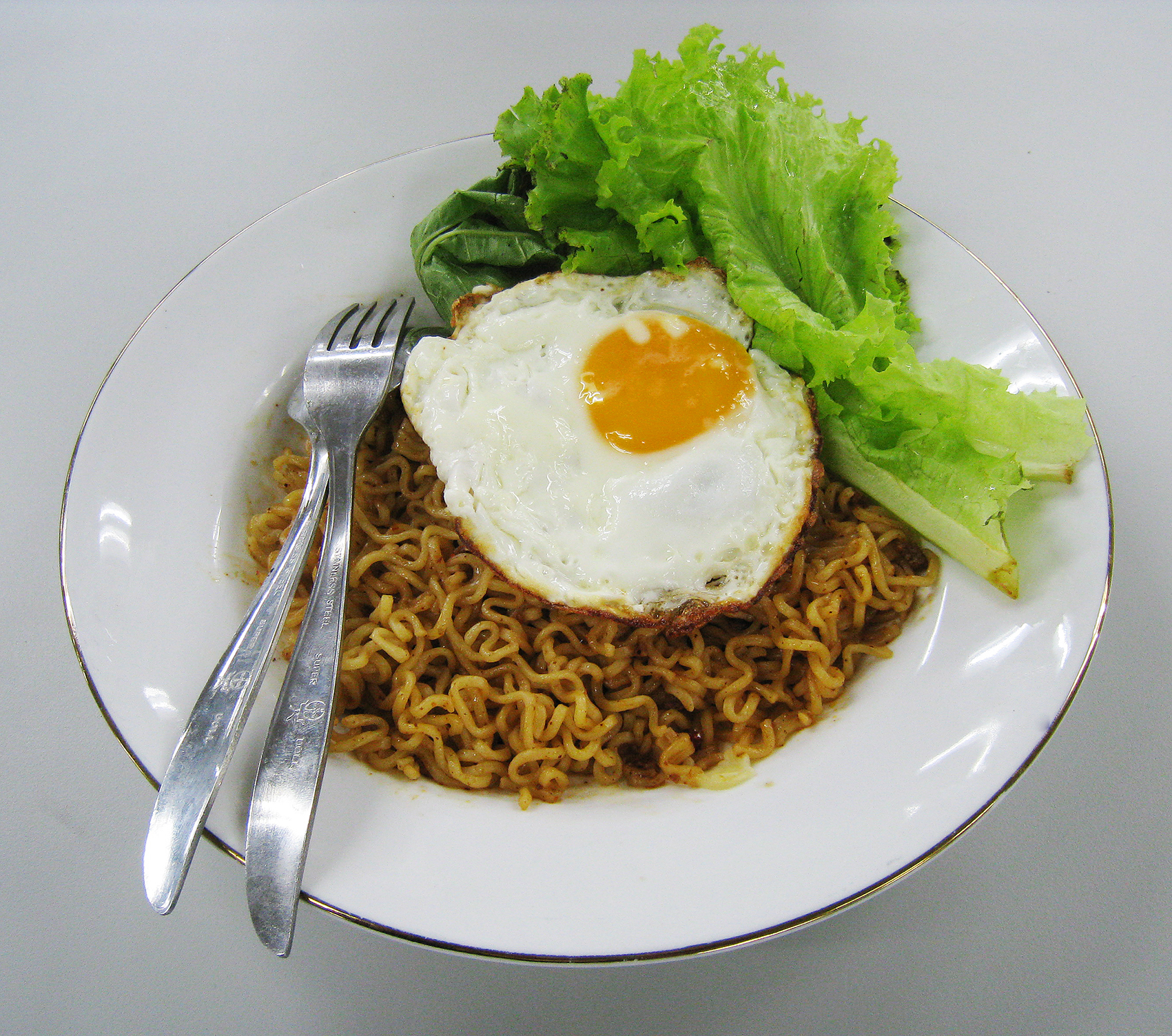
A serving of Indomie iga penyet with fried egg and vegetables

Instant noodles are often criticized as unhealthy or junk food. A single serving of instant noodles is high in carbohydrates, salt, and fat, but low in protein, fiber, vitamins, and essential minerals.

Increased consumption of instant noodles has been associated with obesity and cardiometabolic syndrome in South Korea, which has the highest per capita instant noodle consumption (74.1 servings of instant noodles per person in 2014) worldwide. The study consisted of 3,397 college students (1,782 male; 1,615 female) aged 18–29 years who participated in a health checkup. Statistical analysis using a general linear model that adjusted for age, body mass index, gender, family income, health-related behaviors, and other dietary factors important for cardiometabolic risk, showed a positive association between the frequency of instant noodle consumption and plasma triglyceride levels, diastolic blood pressure, and fasting blood glucose levels in all subjects. Compared to the group with the lowest frequency of instant noodle intake (≤ 1/month), the odds ratio for hypertriglyceridemia in the group with an intake of ≥ 3/week was 2.639 [95% confidence interval (CI), 1.393–5.000] for all subjects, while it was 2.149 (95% CI, 1.045–4.419) and 5.992 (95% CI, 1.859–21.824) for male and female students, respectively. Additionally, a study by researchers at Harvard University of 10,711 adults (54.5% women) 19–64 years of age reported a 68% higher risk of metabolic syndrome among women who consume instant noodles more often than twice a week, but not in men.

Lead contamination in Nestlé's Maggi-brand instant noodles made headlines in India, with some seven times the allowed limit; several Indian states banned the product, as did Nepal. On 5 June 2015, the Food Safety and Standards Authority of India banned all nine approved variants of Maggi instant noodles from India, terming them "unsafe and hazardous" for human consumption. On 13 August 2015, the nationwide ban was struck down by the Bombay High Court. The court stated that proper procedure was not followed in issuing the ban and called into question the test results, as the samples were not tested at authorized laboratories approved by the National Accreditation Board for Testing and Calibration Laboratories.

== Consumption ==
Instant noodles are a popular food in many parts of the world, with flavorings tailored to fit local tastes. In 2018, the World Instant Noodles Association reported that 103.620 billion servings were consumed worldwide. China (and Hong Kong) consumed 40.250 billion servings, while Indonesia consumed 12.540 billion. South Korea tops the world in per capita consumption, at 75 servings. This is followed by Vietnam at 54 servings, and Nepal at 53.

Global demand for instant noodles (in billions of servings)
Country	2014	2015	2016	2017	2018	2019	2020	2021	2022	2023	2024	2025
China	44.40	40.43	38.52	38.97	40.25	41.45	46.35	43.99	45.07	42.21	43.80	43.27
Indonesia	13.43	13.20	13.01	12.62	12.54	12.52	12.64	13.27	14.26	14.54	14.68	14.54
India	5.34	3.26	4.27	5.42	6.06	6.73	6.73	7.56	7.58	8.68	8.82	9.60
Japan	5.50	5.54	5.66	5.66	5.78	5.63	5.97	5.85	5.98	5.84	5.90	5.95
Vietnam	5.00	4.80	4.92	5.06	5.20	5.43	7.03	8.56	8.48	8.13	8.14	7.46
United States	4.28	4.08	4.10	4.13	4.40	4.63	5.05	4.98	5.15	5.10	5.15	5.22
Philippines	3.32	3.48	3.41	3.75	3.98	3.85	4.47	4.44	4.29	4.39	4.49	4.34
South Korea	3.59	3.65	3.83	3.74	3.82	3.90	4.13	3.79	3.95	4.04	4.10	4.06
Thailand	3.07	3.07	3.36	3.39	3.46	3.57	3.71	3.63	3.87	3.95	4.08	4.20
Brazil	2.37	2.37	2.35	2.23	2.37	2.45	2.72	2.85	2.83	2.55	2.60	2.65
Russia	1.94	1.84	1.57	1.78	1.85	1.91	2.00	2.10	2.20	2.20	2.29	2.22
Nigeria	1.52	1.54	1.65	1.76	1.82	1.92	2.46	2.62	2.79	2.98	3.00	3.12
Nepal	1.11	1.19	1.34	1.48	1.57	1.64	1.54	1.59	1.65	1.57	1.61	1.63
Malaysia	1.34	1.37	1.39	1.31	1.37	1.45	1.57	1.58	1.55	1.64	1.67	1.70
Mexico	0.90	0.85	0.89	0.96	1.18	1.17	1.16	1.36	1.51	1.55	1.57	1.59
In billions of servings. Source: World Instant Noodles Association

== See also ==
- List of instant foods
- List of noodle dishes
- CupNoodles Museum Osaka Ikeda
- CupNoodles Museum Yokohama
- List of Japanese soups and stews
- List of ramen dishes
- List of soups
- Lo mein
- Pot Noodle
- Saimin
- Shirataki noodles
- Pasta
- Tsukemen
