= Frozen noodles =

Type of Noodles

- Alternative names: Chilled noodles
- Type: Noodle

Frozen noodles and chilled noodles are types of instantly prepared Asian (or European) noodles that are sold frozen or chilled. These products differ from prepackaged dehydrated noodles in a number of ways: in flavor, in texture, and in that they normally come packaged with ingredients besides the noodles, such as vegetables, meat, and soup stock.

== Types ==
Chilled or frozen applications are applied to udon and Chinese-style noodles. For either type, the idea is that just 20–60 seconds of immersion in boiling water is necessary to reach a ready-to-eat state. Frozen noodles typically take less than two minutes to thaw and cook when placed in boiling water. Boiled and raw frozen noodles are the most commonly produced varieties, with raw varieties being produced less than boiled ones due to problems with dehydration that may occur when raw noodles are stored frozen. Soba (buckwheat) noodles are also manufactured as frozen noodles.

== Production ==
The production of both chilled and frozen noodles starts with boiled noodles cooked to an optimum state of doneness, generally considered as having a moisture gradient at the surface of the noodles of 80% moisture absorption, and at the core of the noodles of 50% moisture absorption. After boiling, chilled noodles are placed into packaging followed by refrigeration at between 4–10 °C (39–50 °F). Frozen noodles, by contrast, are flash frozen using either air blast technology, a contact freezer or a combination of both, usually at −40 °C (−40 °F) for 30 minutes. Both processes induce a swelling of the starch that reduces deterioration and thus extends the noodles' shelf-life. In production, the boiling time for frozen noodles can be determined from a calculation that subtracts the cooking time of frozen boiled noodles from the total boiling time of fresh noodles. Mass-producedFrozen noodles are sometimes packaged first, and then flash frozen. Flash freezing noodles can retain their quality of freshness for up to one year when kept properly frozen.

== Sales ==
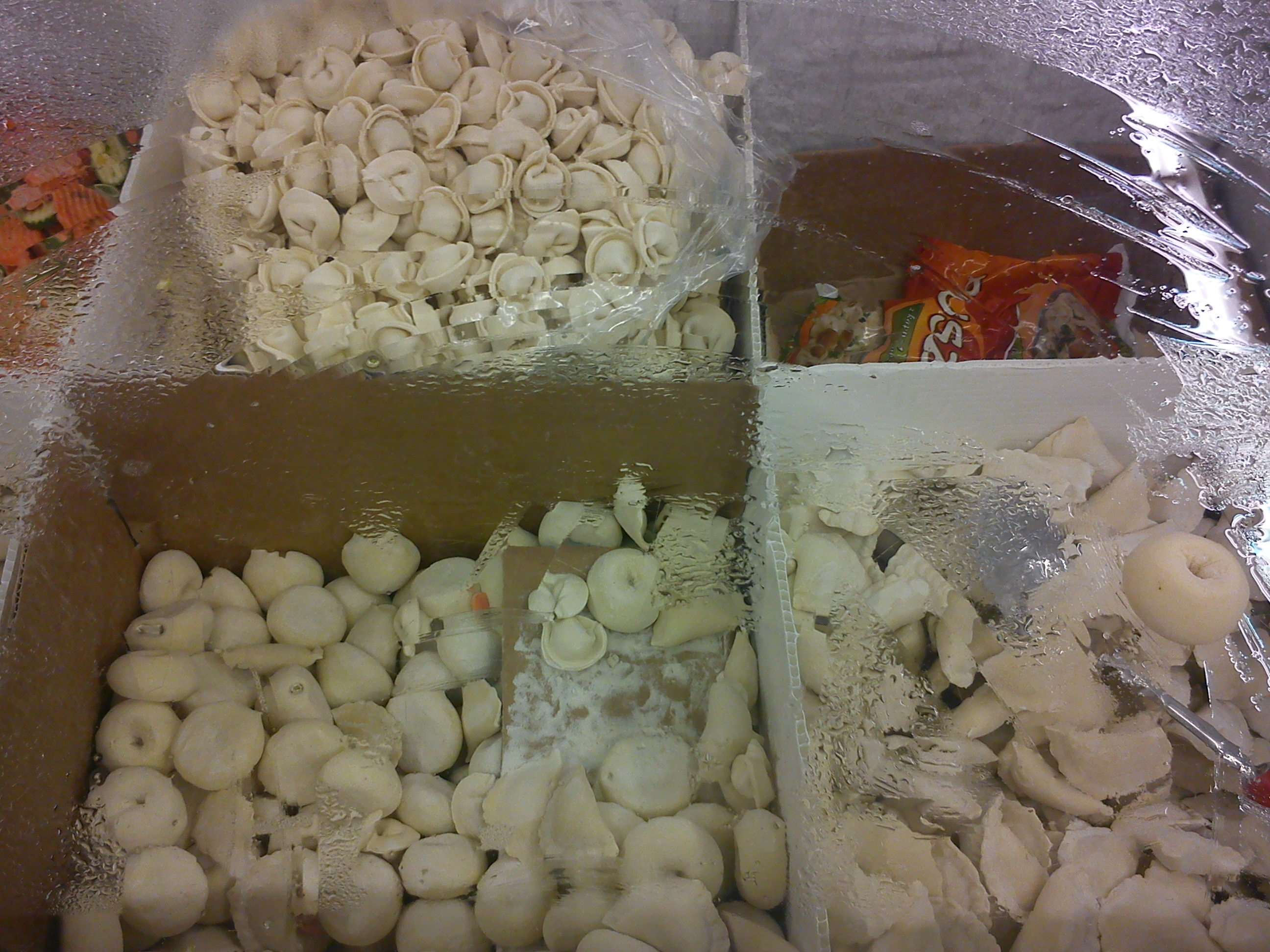
Frozen noodles (in the upper-right corner) and frozen dumplings

As of 2001, chilled noodles accounted for sales of ¥400 billion yuan worldwide while frozen noodles accounted for sales of ¥70 billion yuan worldwide. A large part of these revenues were accounted for by sale to restaurants; frozen noodles are mostly sold from factories directly to restaurants.

== Characteristics ==
Frozen noodles have been cited as having advantages over dried noodles, the process tending to make them less sticky, firmer and thicker than their dried counterparts. Both frozen and dehydrated noodles have a longer shelf-life than chilled noodles, which tend to clump after approximately two weeks of refrigeration due to gelatinisation of starch.

While both frozen and chilled noodles offer convenience for the mass market, and for short preparation times, each have been found to cause loss of optimal texture when tested using alkaline and white salted noodles. In a 2001 study by D. W. Hatcher and M. J. Anderson of the Canadian Grain Commission, textural attributes of the frozen variety were tested at 1 and 4 weeks after frozen storage, and the chilled variety at the 30 minute and 1, 2 and 7 days marks. Both the frozen and the chilled noodles showed a decline in textural characteristics which increased in severity the further forward in time they were sampled after storage. It was also indicated that the texture of raw frozen noodles, cooked after defrosting, as opposed to precooked and then frozen noodles, fared much better.

== See also ==
- Frozen food
- Instant noodles
- Ramen
- Udon
