= Menma =

Japanese condiment made from fermented bamboo shoots

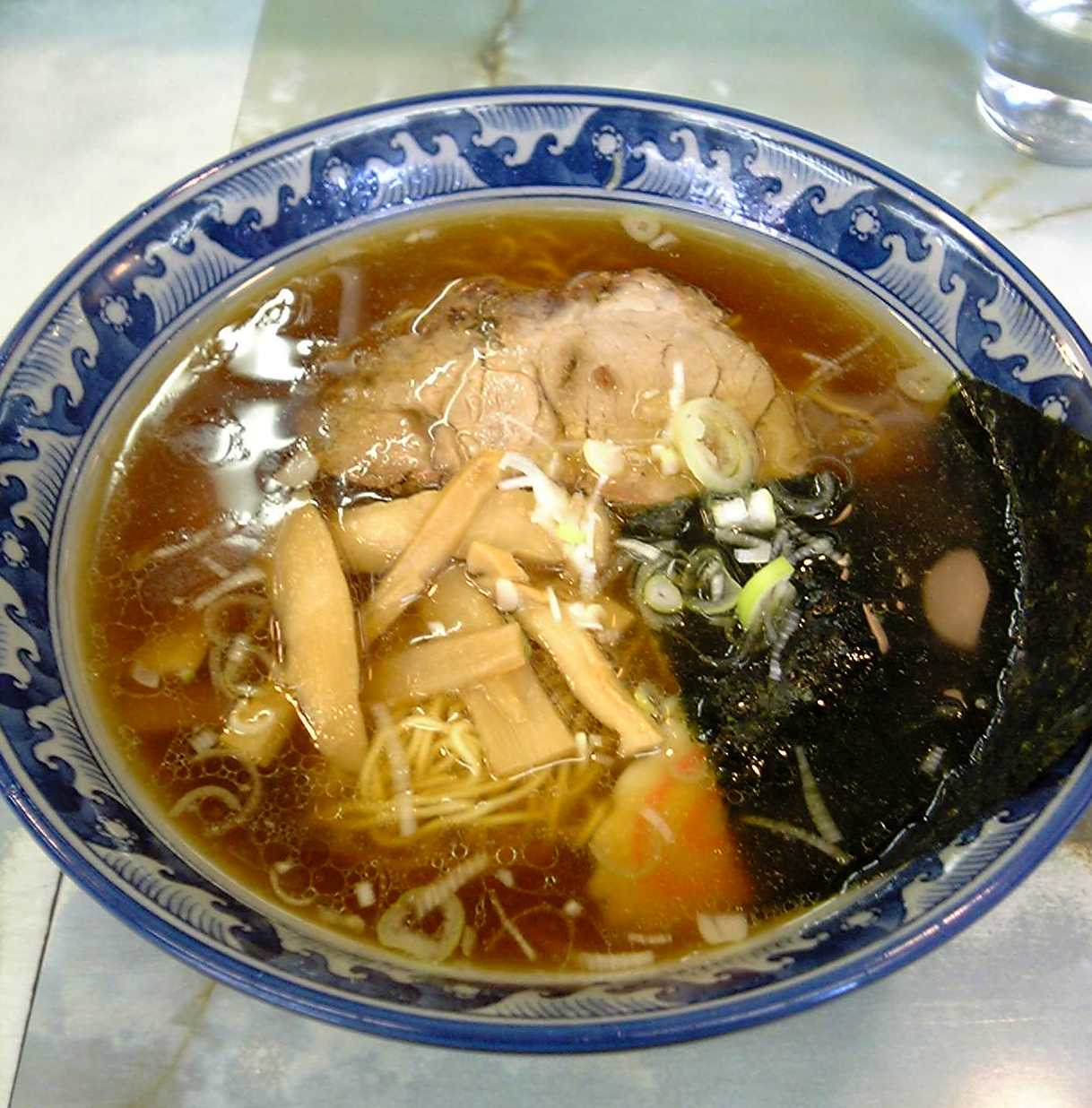
Menma on ramen

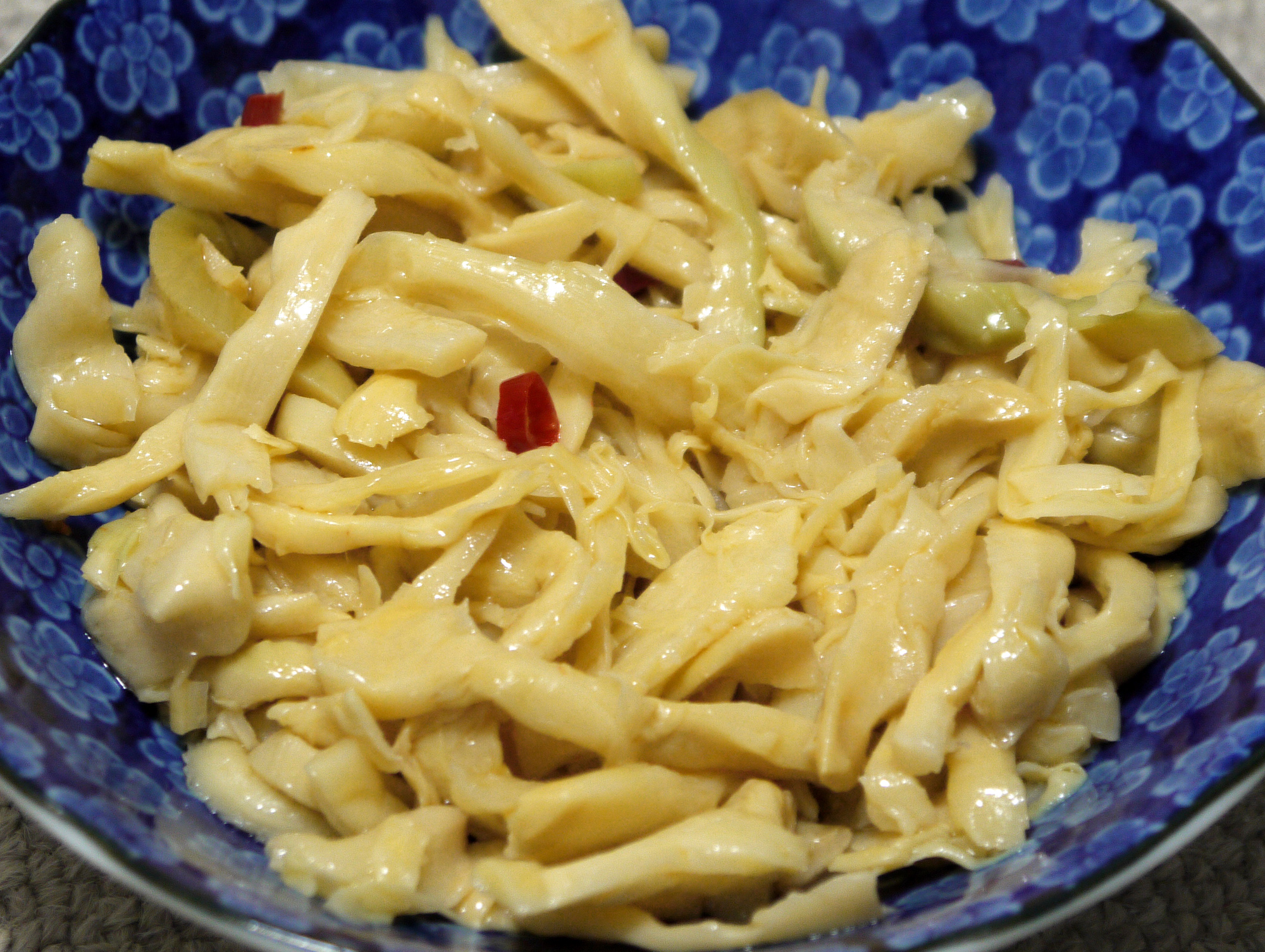
"Hosaki-menma", an ear of menma bamboo

Menma (メンマ, 麺麻, 麺碼) is the Japanese name for the Chinese dish sunsi, which are lacto-fermented bamboo shoots. The bamboo shoots are dried in the sun or through other means before the process of fermentation. Menma is a common topping for noodle soups, notably ramen. Menma is primarily produced in China, with brands imported from southern China and Taiwan being popular. Menma is also known as shinachiku (支那竹), "Chinese bamboo".

== Etymology ==
The trading company that would later become Marumatsu Bussan had been exporting dried bamboo shoots produced in Taiwan as shinachiku. In 1946, responding to a formal objection to the use of the term Shina from the Chinese government, the Japanese Foreign Ministry issued a memorandum recommending that the term be avoided. Marumatsu Bussan founder Shūsui Matsumura claims that he came up with the new product name menma, a portmanteau of ramen (拉麺) and machiku (麻竹), the type of bamboo from which it is made, after seeing it served atop ramen in Yokohama Chinatown. This name could not be trademarked but gradually became accepted as the common name for the condiment as its popularity grew in Japan.

Menma is not, however, customarily eaten atop noodles in Taiwan; the vegetable toppings on the popular noodle dish zhajiangmian 菜碼 (Pinyin: càimǎ) were once called 麵碼 (miànmǎ).

== See also ==
- Talabaw
- Tsukemono
