= Iekei ramen =

Japanese noodle dish

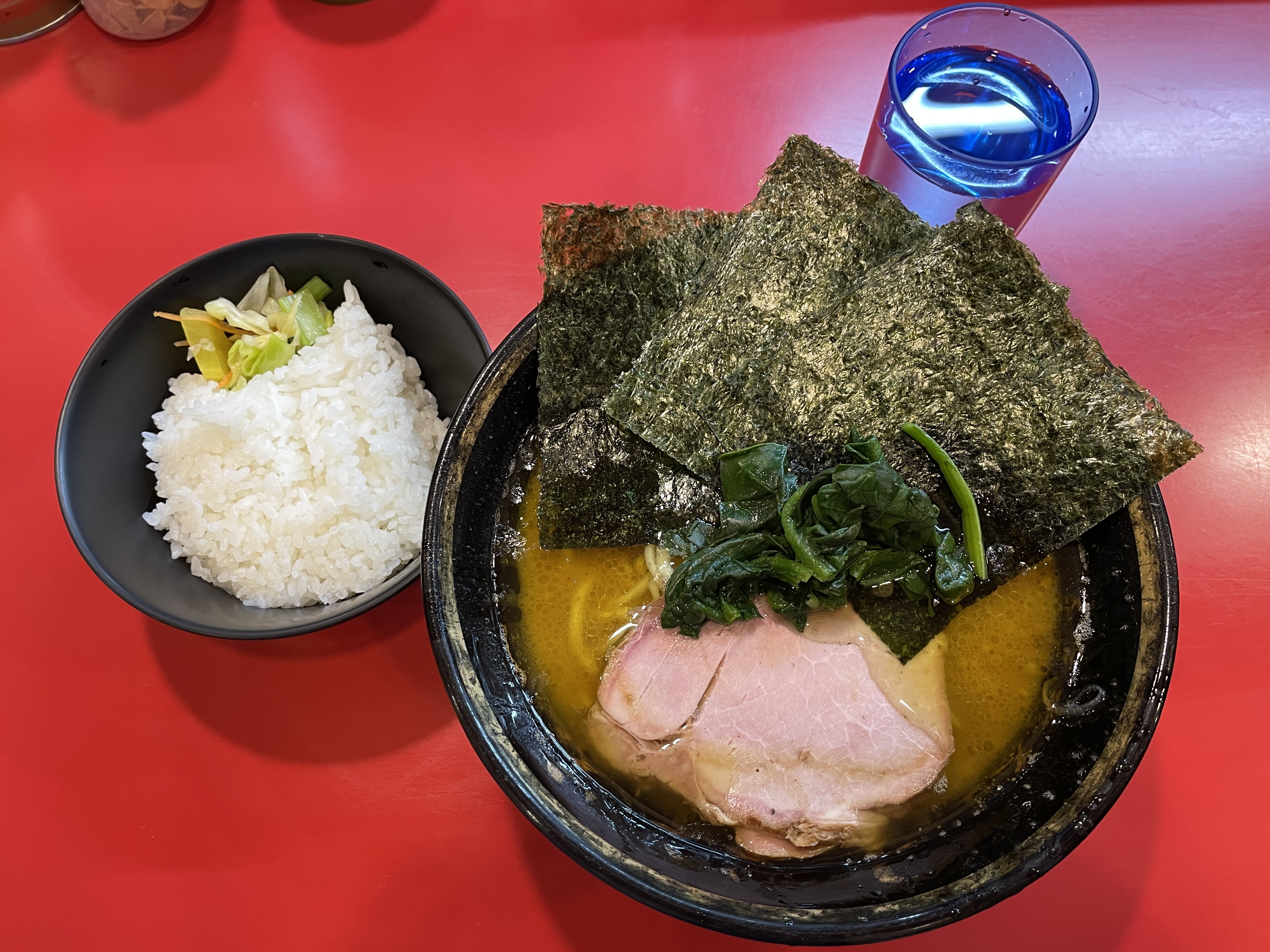
Iekei ramen

Iekei ramen (家系ラーメン) is a variety of ramen featuring a pork marrow and soy sauce broth and thick, straight noodles that was first invented in Yokohama by the ramen shop Yoshimura-ya in 1974. In Canada, Iekei ramen or Yokohama Iekei ramen has become famous with Ramen Arashi located in Banff, Alberta, Canmore, Alberta and Victoria, British Columbia.
