= Alkaline noodles =

Type of noodle

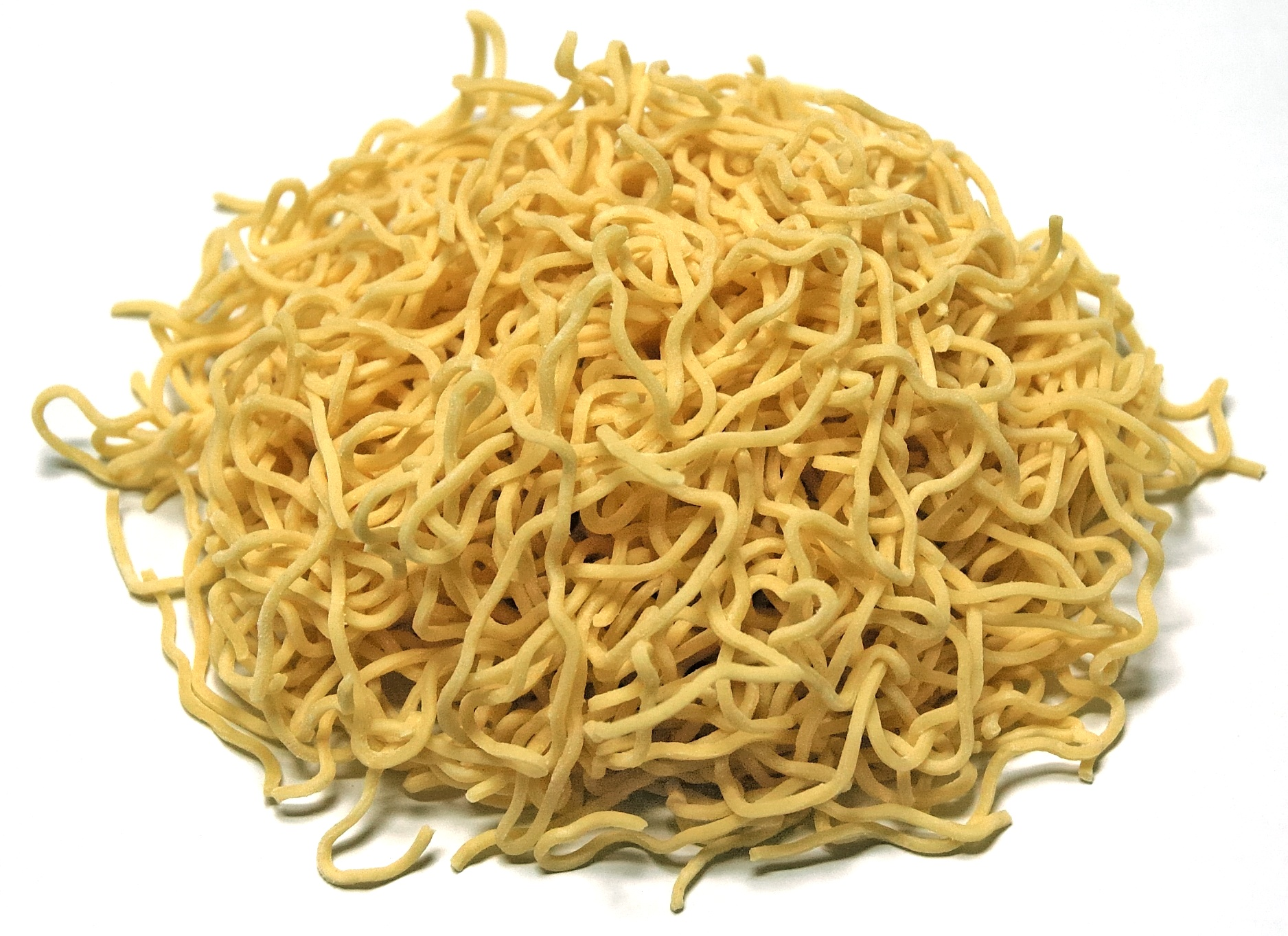
- Ramen noodles, a type of alkaline noodles
- Place of origin: China
- Main ingredients: Durum wheat, flour, alkali

Alkaline noodles or alkali noodles (Chinese: 碱面／碱麵; pinyin: jiǎn miàn) are a variation of noodles traditional to Chinese cuisine with a much higher quantity of alkali than usual. The addition of alkali changes both the flavor and texture of the noodles, and makes them feel slippery in the mouth and on the fingers; they also develop a yellow color and are more elastic than ordinary noodles. Various flours such as ordinary all-purpose white flour, bread flour, and semolina flour can be used, with somewhat varying results. The yellow color is due to flavones that occur naturally in flour, which are normally colorless but turn yellow at alkaline pH.

The term "alkaline noodles" is sometimes used exclusively in English to refer to the noodles called "chukamen" in the Japanese-Chinese dish ramen, but this is inaccurate. Alkaline noodles are not a single type of noodle; rather, they form a broad category consisting of numerous noodle varieties found in China.

== Sources of alkali ==
High alkalinity is typically achieved by the introduction of sodium carbonate (Na_{2}CO_{3} or sodium salt of carbonic acid) into the primary ingredients. In parts of China in which alkaline wheat noodles are common, they are traditionally made with alkaline water from wells. More commonly a mixture of 20% sodium carbonate, which is also an anti-caking agent, and 80% potassium carbonate in water is added directly. This mixture is what the Chinese call jian (碱) or jian shui (碱水) and what the Japanese call kansui (かん水). Sometimes kansui can also be a solution of sodium hydroxide or a powdered mix of sodium carbonate, potassium carbonate, and sometimes sodium phosphates in various proportions (solid kansui).

Chinese noodles from Gansu Province in China include the chewy "hand-pulled" type, lamian, which are formed with no rolling or extrusion. Proper texture requires the addition of the alkaline peng hui (蓬灰), which is traditionally derived from the ash of the Halogeton arachnoideus plant. Traditional peng hui potash contains potassium carbonate, which makes the noodle dough softer and more tender by inhibiting the development of gluten. In 1989 the first artificial replacement was developed by the Lanzhou University (now the Gansu Lisi Food Science & Technology Co.) which is a mixture of salt, sodium carbonate, sodium tripolyphosphate, and sodium metabisulfite. "Lanzhou pulled noodles", even though the noodle makers may not be from Lanzhou, the capital of Gansu, are becoming, according to the New York Times, "a catchphrase that signifies deliciousness everywhere, [like] 'Chicago pizza' or 'New York bagels'."
