= Sunsi =

Chinese lacto-fermented bamboo shoots

Sunsi (simplified Chinese: 笋丝; traditional Chinese: 筍絲; pinyin: sǔnsī; lit. 'shredded bamboo shoots') is a Chinese food product made from bamboo shoots that have undergone lactic acid fermentation. An alternative name for sunsi is sungan (simplified Chinese: 笋干; traditional Chinese: 筍乾; pinyin: sǔngān; lit. 'dried bamboo shoots'), although sungan may also refer to dried bamboo shoots that have not been fermented.

Sunsi are typically made using the winter shoots of the sweet bamboo (Dendrocalamus latiflorus), which is widely cultivated across southern China. The harvested bamboo shoots are soaked, boiled, fermented, shredded into thin strips, and then dried. A related product made by pickling bamboo shoots is called suansun (simplified Chinese: 酸笋; traditional Chinese: 酸筍; pinyin: suānsǔn; lit. 'sour bamboo shoots').

In Okinawan cuisine, sunsi are known as "sunshi" (スンシ) and used in the dish sunshi irichi. In mainland Japanese cuisine, they are called "menma" and are primarily used as a ramen topping. Sunsi were formerly known as "shinachiku" (lit. "Chinese bamboo") in mainland Japan.
