= Ramen =

Japanese noodle dish

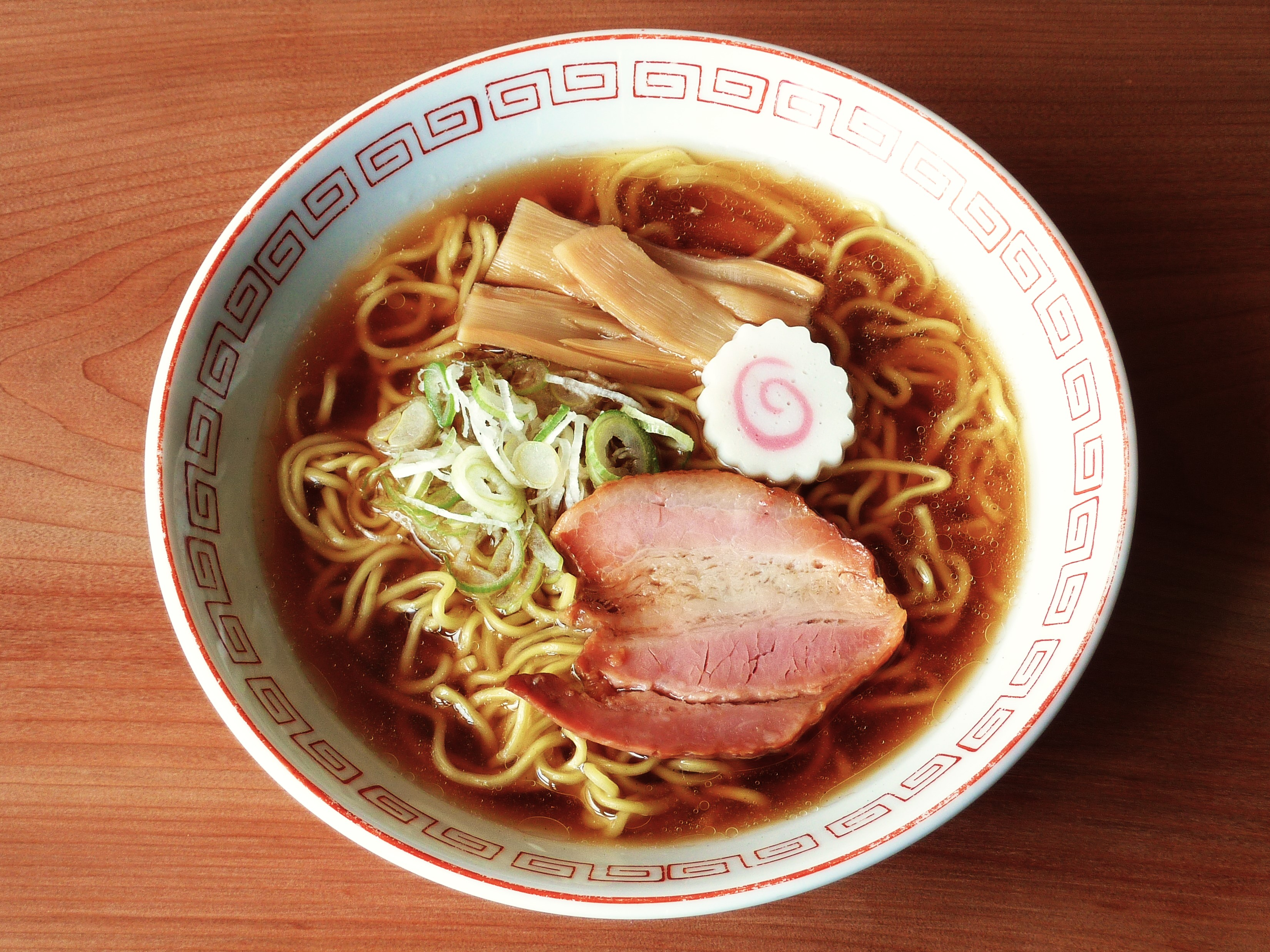
- Shōyu ramen
- Alternative names: Nankin soba, shina soba, chūka soba
- Type: Noodle soup
- Place of origin: Yokohama Chinatown, Japan (adaptation)
- Region or state: East Asia
- Main ingredients: Chinese-style alkaline wheat noodles, meat- or fish-based broth, vegetables or meat
- Variations: Many variants, especially regional, with various ingredients and toppings

Ramen (/ˈrɑːmən/) (拉麺, ラーメン or らあめん, rāmen; [ɾaꜜːmeɴ]) is a Japanese-Chinese fusion noodle dish. It includes Chinese-style alkaline wheat noodles (中華麺, chūkamen) served in several flavors of hot broth. Common flavors are soy sauce and miso, with typical toppings including sliced pork (chāshū), nori (dried seaweed), lacto-fermented bamboo shoots (menma), narutomaki, and scallions. Nearly every region in Japan has its own variation of ramen, such as the tonkotsu (pork bone broth) ramen of Kyushu and the miso ramen of Hokkaido.

The origins of ramen can be traced back to Yokohama Chinatown in the late 19th century. While the word "ramen" is a Japanese borrowing of the Chinese word lāmiàn (拉麵), meaning "pulled noodles", the ramen does not actually derive from any lamian dishes. Lamian is a part of northern Chinese cuisine, whereas the ramen evolved from southern Chinese noodle dishes from regions such as Guangdong, reflecting the demographics of Chinese immigrants in Yokohama. Ramen was largely confined to the Chinese community in Japan and was never popular nationwide until after World War II (specifically the Second Sino-Japanese War), following increased wheat consumption due to rice shortages and the return of millions of Japanese colonizers from China. In 1958, instant noodles were invented by Momofuku Ando, further popularizing the dish.

Ramen was originally looked down upon by the Japanese due to racial discrimination against the Chinese and its status as an inexpensive food associated with the working class. Today, ramen is considered a national dish of Japan, with many regional varieties and a wide range of toppings. Examples include Sapporo's rich miso ramen, Hakodate's salt-flavored ramen, Kitakata's thick, flat noodles in pork-and-niboshi broth, Tokyo-style ramen with soy-flavored chicken broth, Yokohama's Iekei ramen with soy-flavored pork broth, Wakayama's soy sauce and pork bone broth, and Hakata's milky tonkotsu (pork bone) broth. Ramen is offered in various establishments and locations, with the best quality usually found in specialist ramen shops called rāmen'ya (ラーメン屋).

Ramen's popularity has spread outside of Japan, becoming a cultural icon representing the country worldwide. In Korea, ramen is known both by its original name "ramen" (라멘) as well as ramyeon (라면), a local variation on the dish. In China, ramen is called rìshì lāmiàn (日式拉面/日式拉麵 "Japanese-style lamian"). Ramen has also made its way into Western restaurant chains. Instant ramen was exported from Japan in 1971 and has since gained international recognition. The global popularity of ramen has sometimes led to the term being misused in the Anglosphere as a catch-all for any noodle soup dish.

== Etymology ==
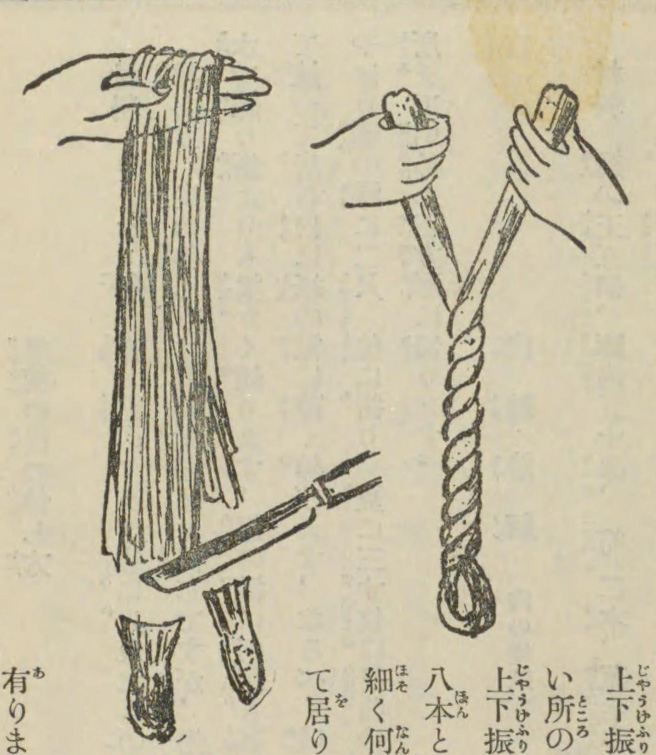
From Seiichi Yoshida, How to Prepare Delicious and Economical Chinese Dishes (1928)

The word ramen is a Japanese borrowing of the Mandarin Chinese lamian (拉麵, 'pulled noodles'). A common misconception is that ramen is a Japanese adaptation of lamian, but the two dishes have no direct relation, and how ramen came to adopt its name from lamian remains unclear. Ramen evolved from southern Chinese noodle dishes, primarily Cantonese, as opposed to northern Chinese noodle dishes that may feature lamian.

The word ramen (拉麺) first appeared in Japan in Seiichi Yoshida's How to Prepare Delicious and Economical Chinese Dishes (1928). In the book, Yoshida describes how to make ramen using flour and kansui, kneading it by hand, and stretching it with an illustration. He also states that ramen is better suited for soup or cold noodles than for baked noodles. In this case, however, ramen refers to actual lamian (hand-pulled noodles), not the noodle soup dish.

There are various theories on how the dish came to be named "ramen", but the most plausible is that the term was misapplied by Japanese colonizers. After the end of World War II in 1945, millions of Japanese settler colonists were repatriated to Japan from China. They may have labeled the southern Chinese noodle dishes in Japan "ramen", based on their superficial resemblance to lamian dishes they had encountered in northern China, particularly in the Japanese-backed puppet state of Manchukuo. Some cookbooks from this time period include ramen, such as Hatsuko Kuroda's Enjoyable Home Cooking (1947).

Chinese immigrants in Japan initially served a wide variety of Chinese noodle soup dishes, and referred to them by their specific names. However, they were collectively referred to as Nankin soba (南京そば; lit. 'Nanjing noodles') by the Japanese. Nankinmachi (Nanjing Town) was the common Japanese term for areas where Chinese people settled, and the Japanese used the term "Nankin" to describe newly imported Chinese things. For example, in 1903, in Yokohama Chinatown, then known as Nankinmachi, there was a Nanjing noodle restaurant (南京蕎麦所, Nankin soba dokoro).

The dish was renamed shina soba (支那そば; lit. 'Chinese noodles') in 1910 by Kan'ichi Ozaki, the founder of the first specialized ramen shop. The Japanese regarded Chinese civilization as inferior and this name change reflected broader imperialist attitudes within Japanese society towards China. The word washoku was used for Japanese cuisine, yoshoku symbolized Western cuisine, and Chinese cuisine was called shina ryori. In the decades following, shina soba would be the most commonly used name for ramen.

After World War II, the word shina (支那, meaning 'China') acquired a pejorative connotation through its association with anti-Chinese racism and Japanese imperialism. The word shina was replaced with chūka across various terms in the Japanese language. Chūka is derived from the Japanese reading of Zhōnghuá (中华; 中華; 'central beauty'), an official name used by the two governments claiming sovereignty over China, the Republic of China (中華民國; Zhōnghuá Mínguó) and People's Republic of China (中华人民共和国; Zhōnghuá Rénmín Gònghéguó). Shina ryōri was changed to chūka ryōri, and likewise, the term chūka soba (中華そば; lit. 'Chinese noodles') replaced shina soba.

The Nissin Chikin Ramen, created by Momofuku Ando, was released in 1958, and the name ramen (ラーメン) began to spread across the country. Today ramen is the most popular name, but chūka soba remains prevalent in areas such as Takayama. The two terms can be used interchangeably, though chūka soba is also often used to refer to more "classic" styles of ramen.

== History ==
=== Origin ===
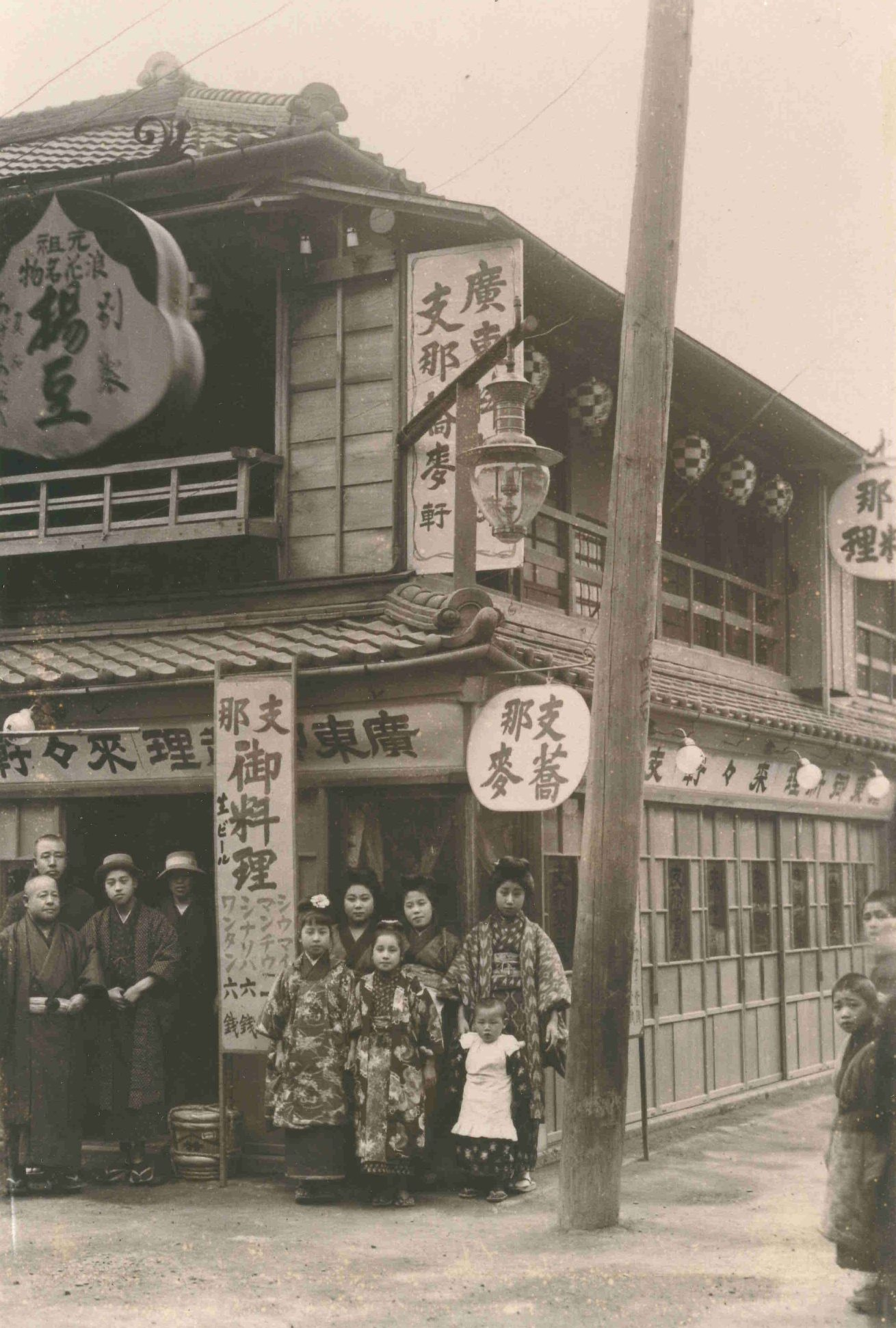
Rairaiken (来々軒), the first ramen shop, founded in 1910 by Kan'ichi Ozaki in Asakusa, Tokyo. The signs advertise "Chinese soba" (支那蕎麥) and "Cantonese cuisine" (廣東料理).

Ramen is a Japanese adaptation of Chinese wheat noodle soups. It is first recorded to have appeared in Yokohama Chinatown in the early 20th century. However, the dishes ancestral to ramen already existed in Japan within the Chinese community since the 1880s. Although ramen takes its name from lamian, it did not originate from the hand-pulled lamian noodles of northern China, since the noodles used in ramen are cut, not pulled. Rather, ramen is largely derived from southern Chinese noodle dishes, particularly those from Cantonese cuisine. This is reflective of Yokohama Chinatown's demographics, as the majority of Chinese settlers there were Cantonese, followed by Shanghainese.

Sōmen is another type of noodle of Chinese origin made from wheat flour, but in Japan it is distinguished from the noodles used in ramen. The noodles used for ramen today are called chūkamen (中華麺; lit. 'Chinese noodles') and are made with kansui (鹹水, alkaline salt water).

The official diary of Shōkoku-ji Temple in Kyoto, Inryōken Nichiroku (蔭涼軒日録), mentions eating jīngdàimiàn (経帯麪), noodles with kansui, in 1488. Jīngdàimiàn is the noodle of the Yuan dynasty. This is the earliest record of kansui noodles being eaten in Japan.

One theory says that ramen was introduced to Japan during the 1660s by the neo-Confucian scholar Zhu Shunsui, who served as an advisor to Tokugawa Mitsukuni after he became a refugee in Japan to escape Manchu rule. Mitsukuni became the first Japanese person to eat ramen. However, the noodles Mitsukuni ate were a combination of starch made from lotus root and wheat flour, which is different from chūkamen with kansui.

According to historians, the more plausible theory is that ramen was introduced to Japan in the late 19th century by Chinese immigrants living in Yokohama Chinatown. By 1884, Chinese noodle soups had grown popular in Yokohama, Kobe, Nagasaki, and Hakodate, however, this popularity was mostly concentrated among Chinese immigrants. The Chinese served a variety of noodle soup dishes and referred to them by their specific names, such as char siu tang mian (roast pork noodle soup) and rousi tang mian (sliced pork noodle soup). The Japanese referred to all these noodle soup dishes as Nankin soba ('Nanjing noodles'). These noodle soups were particularly in high demand among Chinese students, who missed the cuisine of their homelands and found Japanese food bland in comparison.

The Japanese government passed a law in 1899 allowing resident aliens to own businesses outside their designated settlements. This development, in addition to increased labor demands, led to a spread of Chinese immigrants throughout Japan. By 1900, restaurants serving Chinese cuisine from Guangzhou and Shanghai offered a simple dish of noodles, a few toppings, and a broth flavored with salt and pork bones. Many Chinese living in Japan also pulled portable food stalls, selling ramen. By the mid-1900s, these stalls used a type of a musical horn called a charumera (チャルメラ, from the Portuguese charamela) to advertise their presence, a practice some vendors still retain via a loudspeaker and a looped recording.

==== First store ====
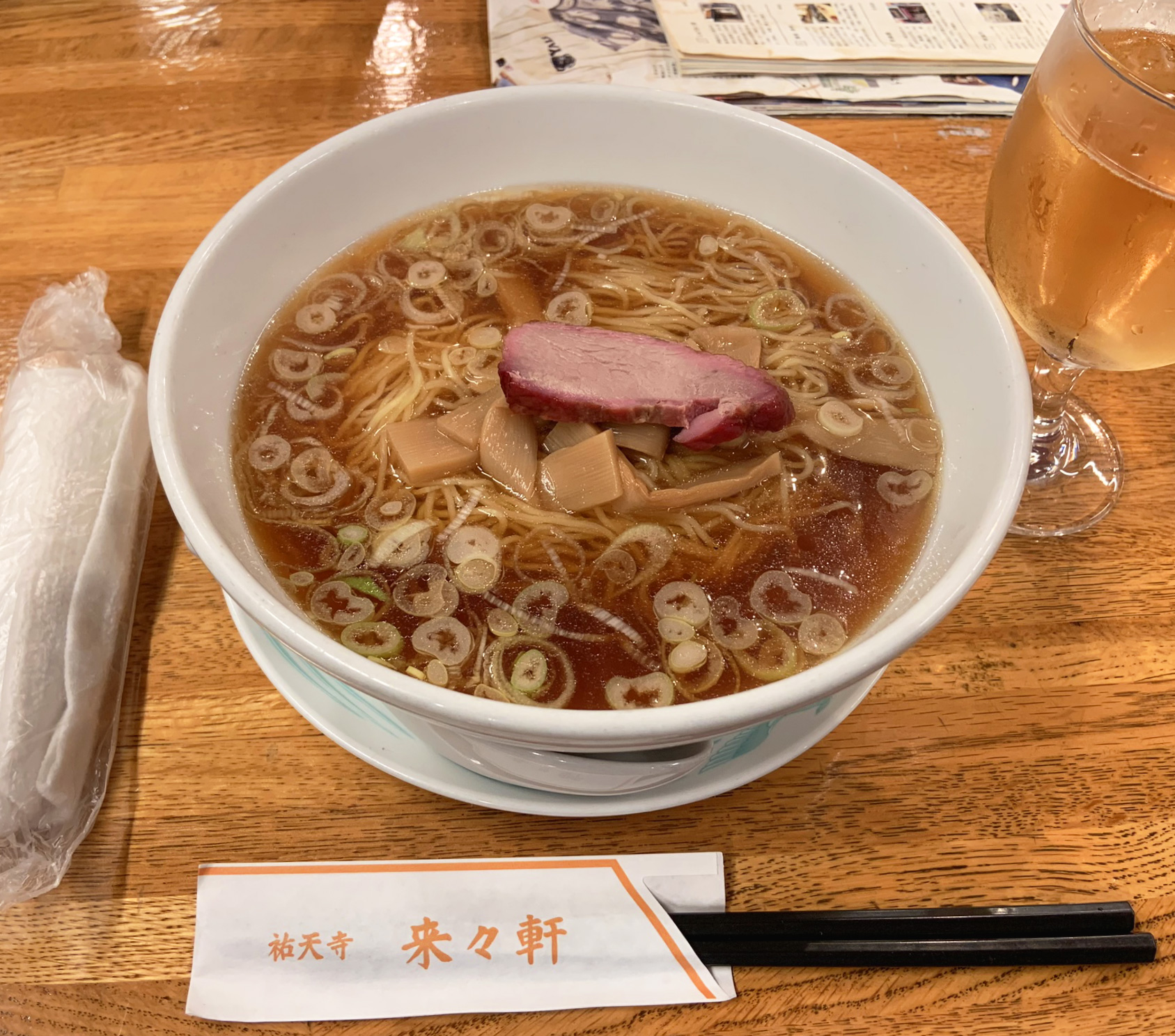
A bowl of ramen from the second Rairaiken in Yūtenji, opened in 1933 by Fu Xinglei (傅興雷), one of the twelve Chinese cooks from the first Rairaiken store in Asakusa

According to ramen expert Hiroshi Osaki, the first specialized ramen shop was Rairaiken (来々軒), which opened in 1910 in Asakusa, Tokyo. The Japanese founder, Kan'ichi Ozaki (尾崎貫一), employed twelve Cantonese cooks from Yokohama's Chinatown and served the ramen arranged for Japanese customers. In contrast to most Japanese, who held prejudiced views toward Chinese cuisine, Ozaki grew up in Yokohama, where he experienced Chinese food firsthand and witnessed the popularity of noodle dishes in the city's Chinatown. Early versions of ramen were wheat noodles in broth topped with char siu. Ozaki changed the name of the noodle dishes from Nankin soba to Shina soba. The store also served standard Cantonese fare like wontons and shumai, and is sometimes regarded as the origin of Japanese-Chinese fusion dishes like chūkadon and tenshindon.

Rairaiken's original store closed in 1976, but related stores with the same name currently exist in other places, and have connections to the first store.

In 1925, a Chinese traveller named Fan Qinxing from Zhejiang province opened a ramen shop called Genraiken in Kitakata as an homage to the popular Rairaiken.

In 1933, Fu Xinglei (傅興雷), one of the twelve original chefs, opened a second Rairaiken in Yūtenji, Meguro Ward, Tokyo.

In 1968, one of Kan'ichi Ozaki's apprentices opened a store named Shinraiken ("New Raiken") in Chiba Prefecture.

In 2020, Ozaki's grandson and great-great-grandson re-opened the original Rairaiken as a store inside Shin-Yokohama Rāmen Museum. The popup closed at September 2025.

In 2026, the great-great-grandson of Kan'ichi Ozaki, Yusaka Takahashi, reopened the original Rairaiken in Asakusa after his 92 year old grandfather wanted to eat the original again.

=== Popularization and modernization ===
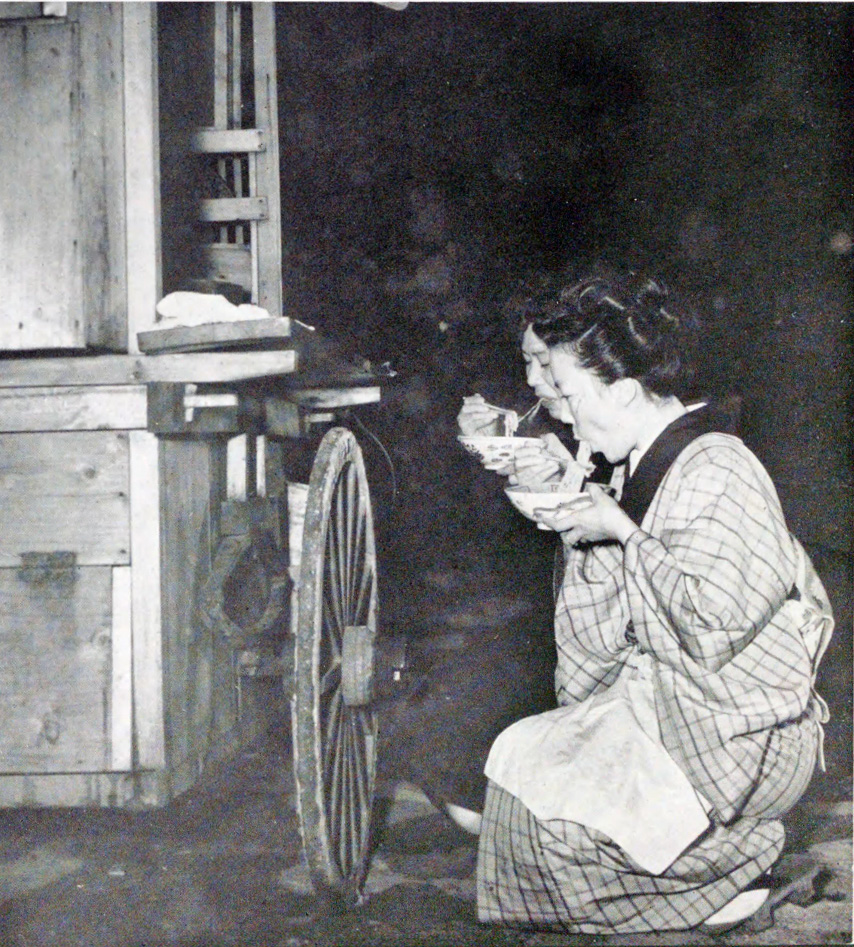
Women eating shina soba at a shina soba stall, Tokyo, 1956

After Japan's defeat in World War II, the American military occupied the country from 1945 to 1952. In December 1945, Japan recorded its worst rice harvest in 42 years, which caused food shortages as Japan had drastically reduced rice production during the war as production shifted to colonies in China and Formosa island. The US flooded the market with cheap wheat flour to deal with food shortages.

During the same period, millions of Japanese colonizers returned from China and other parts of East Asia. It was only in 1947, in the post-war period, that the term ramen was first recorded in Japan to refer to the southern Chinese noodle dish that originated in Yokohama Chinatown, possibly because it superficially resembled the lamian dishes they had encountered in northern China. Many Japanese repatriates were familiar with Chinese cuisine and opened yatai (food stalls) selling ramen. Jiaozi, a staple food of northern China, also began to be served as a complement to ramen at these stalls. These jiaozi were called gyoza by the Japanese, a name likely adopted in the puppet state of Manchukuo and derived from the Manchu word giyose.

From 1948 to 1951, bread consumption in Japan increased from 262,121 tons to 611,784 tons, but wheat also found its way into ramen, which most Japanese ate at black market food vendors to survive as the government food distribution system ran about 20 days behind schedule. Although the Americans maintained Japan's wartime ban on outdoor food vending, flour was secretly diverted from commercial mills into the black markets, where nearly 90 percent of stalls were under the control of gangsters related to the yakuza who extorted vendors for protection money. Thousands of ramen vendors were arrested during the occupation.

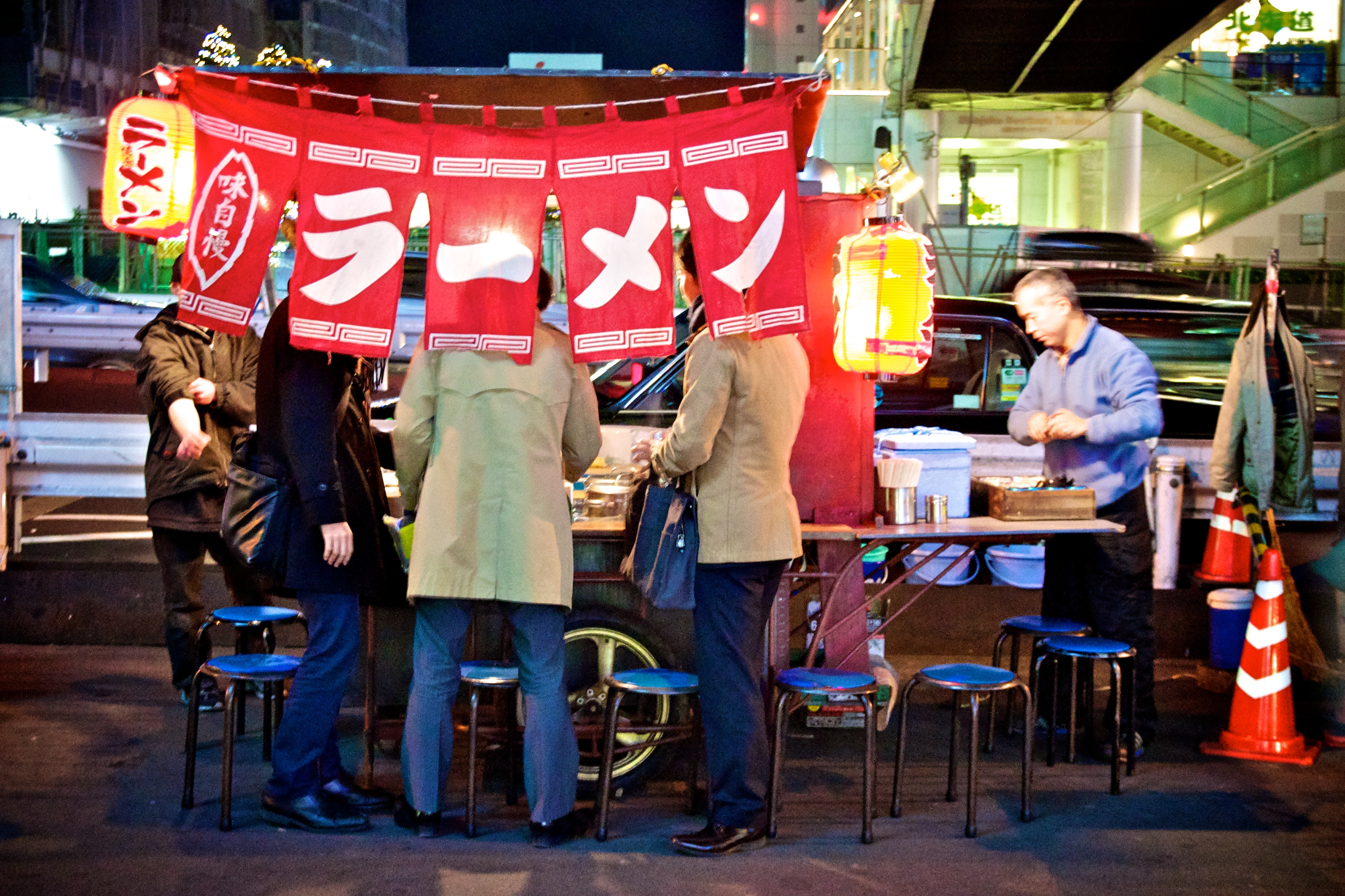
A mobile ramen stall (yatai) in Shinjuku, Tokyo

By 1950 wheat flour exchange controls were removed and restrictions on food vending loosened, which further boosted the number of ramen vendors: private companies even rented out yatai starter kits consisting of noodles, toppings, bowls, and chopsticks. Ramen yatai provided a rare opportunity for small-scale postwar entrepreneurship. The Americans also aggressively advertised the nutritional benefits of wheat and animal protein. The combination of these factors caused wheat noodles to gain prominence in Japan's rice-based culture. Gradually, ramen became associated with urban life.

A hot bowl of tonkotsu ramen in Tokyo

In 1958, instant noodles were invented by Momofuku Ando, the Taiwanese-Japanese founder and chairman of Nissin Foods. Named the greatest Japanese invention of the 20th century in a Japanese poll, instant ramen allowed anyone to make an approximation of this dish simply by adding boiling water.

Beginning in the 1980s, ramen became a Japanese cultural icon and was studied around the world. At the same time, local varieties of ramen were hitting the national market and could even be ordered by their regional names. A ramen museum opened in Yokohama in 1994.

Today ramen is one of Japan's most popular foods, with Tokyo alone containing around 5,000 ramen shops, and more than 24,000 ramen shops across Japan. Tsuta, a ramen restaurant in Tokyo's Sugamo district, received a Michelin star in December 2015.

== Types ==
A wide variety of ramen exists in Japan, with geographical and vendor-specific differences even in varieties that share the same name. Usually varieties of ramen are differentiated by the type of broth and tare used. There are five components to a bowl of ramen: tare, aroma oil, broth, noodles, and toppings.

=== Noodles ===
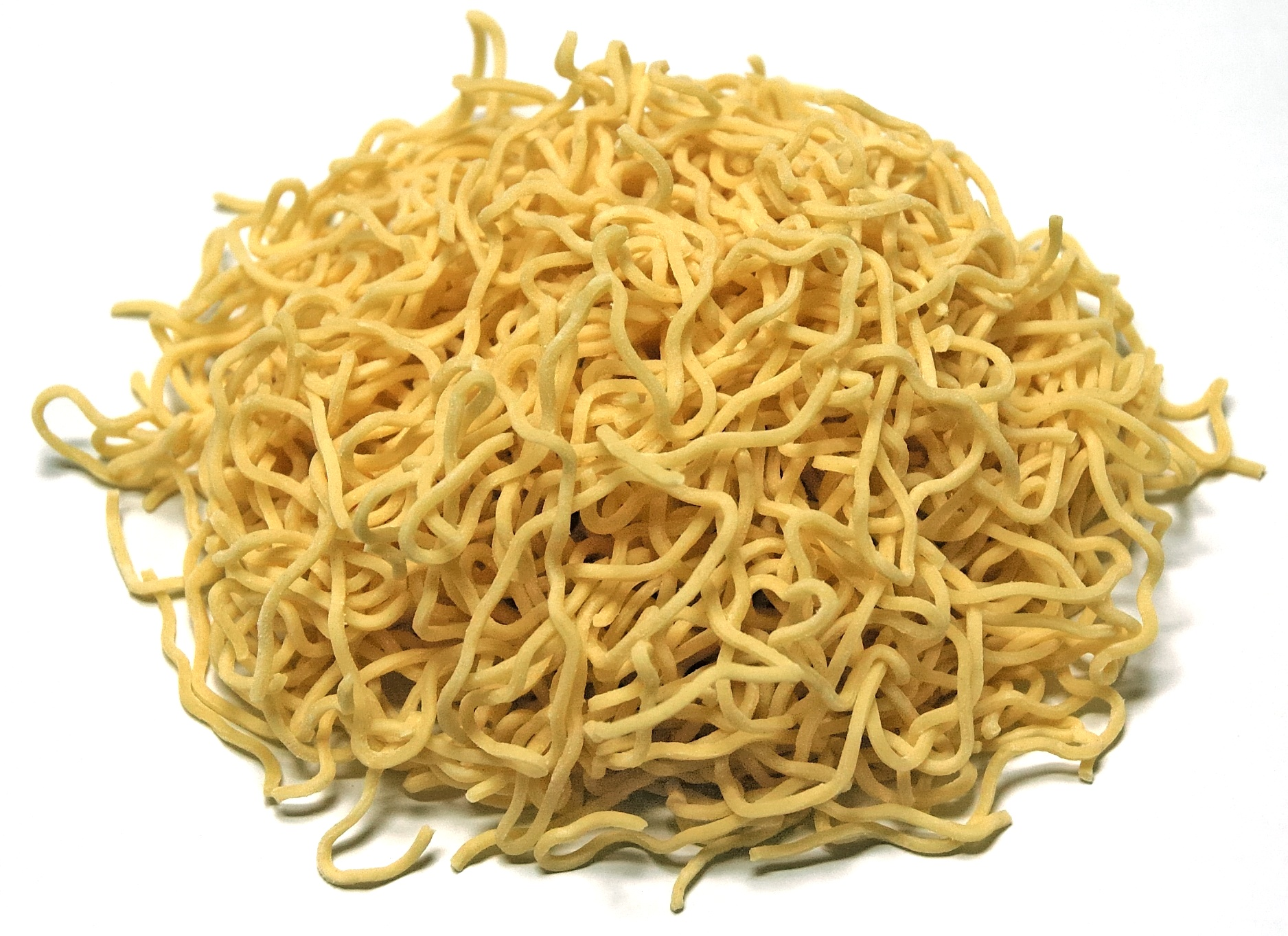
Fresh ramen noodles

The type of noodles used in ramen are called chūkamen (中華麺; lit. 'Chinese noodles'), which are derived from traditional Chinese alkaline noodles known as jiǎnshuǐ miàn (鹼水麵). Most chūkamen are made from four basic ingredients: wheat flour, salt, water, and kansui, derived from the Chinese jiǎnshuǐ (鹼水), a type of alkaline mineral water containing sodium carbonate and usually potassium carbonate, as well as sometimes a small amount of phosphoric acid. Ramen is not to be confused with different kinds of noodle such as soba, udon, or somen.

The origin of jiǎnshuǐ is unclear. It is said to originate in Inner Mongolia. Making noodles with jiǎnshuǐ lends them a yellowish hue as well as a firm texture. But since there is no natural jiǎnshuǐ or kansui in Japan, it was difficult to make jiǎnshuǐ miàn or chūkamen before the Meiji Restoration (1868).

Ramen comes in various shapes and lengths. It may be thick, thin, or even ribbon-like, as well as straight or wrinkled.

Traditionally, ramen noodles were made by hand, but with growing popularity, many ramen restaurants prefer to use noodle-making machines to meet the increased demand and improve quality. Automatic ramen-making machines imitating manual production methods have been available since the mid-20th century produced by such Japanese manufacturers as Yamato MFG., and others.

=== Soup ===
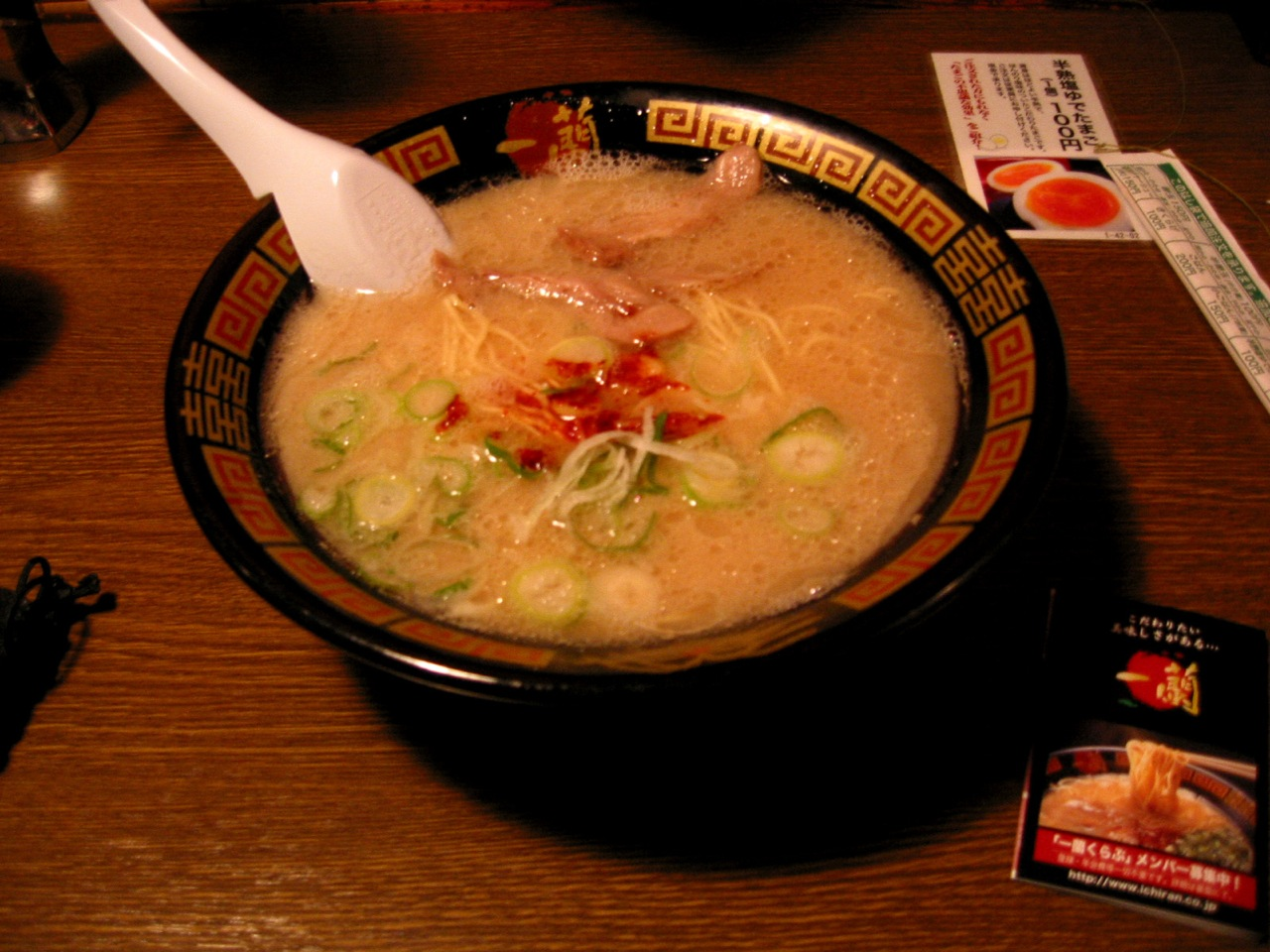
Ramen in tonkotsu soup

Similar to Chinese soup bases, ramen soup is generally made from chicken or pork, though vegetable and fish stock is also used. This base stock is often combined with dashi stock components such as katsuobushi (skipjack tuna flakes), niboshi (dried baby sardines), saba bushi (mackerel flakes), shiitake, and kombu (kelp). Ramen stock is usually divided into two categories: chintan and paitan.

- Chintan (清湯), derived from the Chinese qīngtāng (清湯; 'clear soup'), is a clear stock, made by simmering ingredients and frequently skimming foam and scum off the top of the pot. Chintan stocks are the most common kind, and can be made from chicken, pork, vegetables and/or niboshi.
- Paitan (白湯), derived from the Chinese baitang (白湯; 'white soup'), is a broth with an opaque white colored appearance and a creamy consistency that rivals milk, melted butter or gravy (depending on the shop). Paitan stock is made by boiling pork or chicken bones at a high heat for hours at a time, allowing the bones to emulsify into the soup. The most well-known and common paitan stock is tonkotsu (豚骨, 'pork bone'; not to be confused with tonkatsu). Although tonkotsu is merely a kind of broth, some people consider tonkotsu ramen (specialty of Kyushu, its birthplace) a distinct flavor category. When chicken bones are used to make a paitan stock, the resulting soup is called tori paitan (鶏白湯).

=== Tare ===
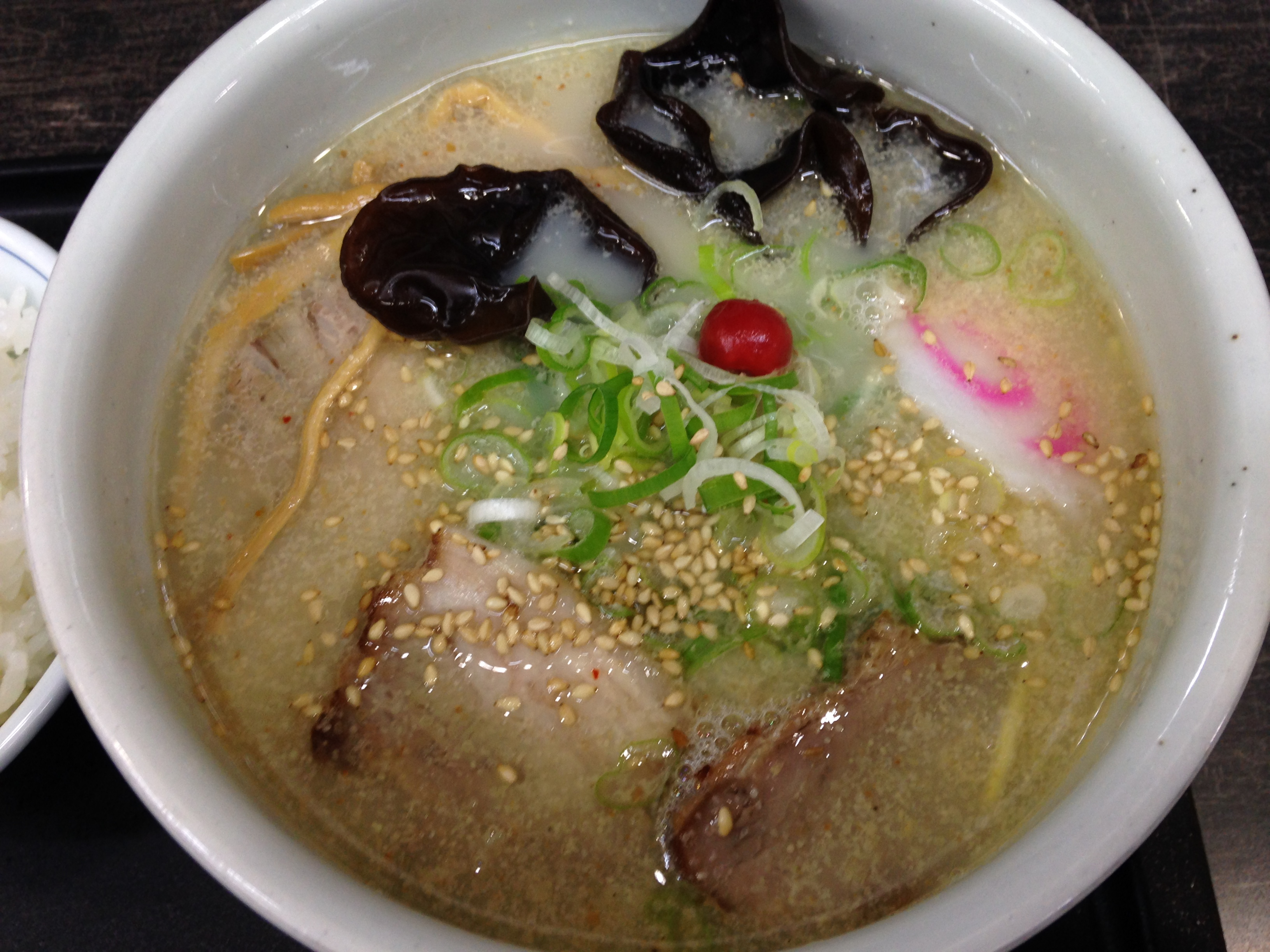
Shio ramen

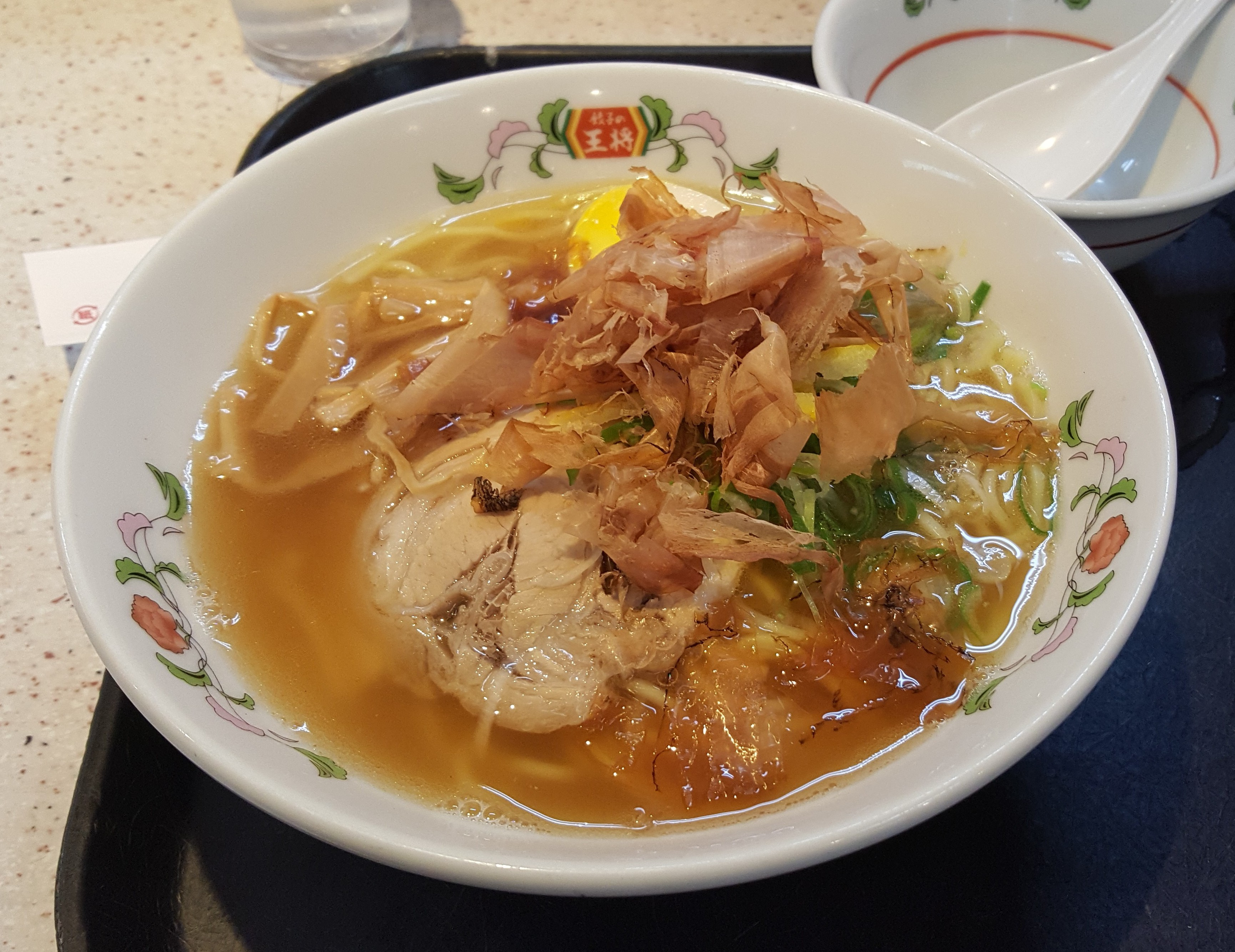
Shōyu ramen

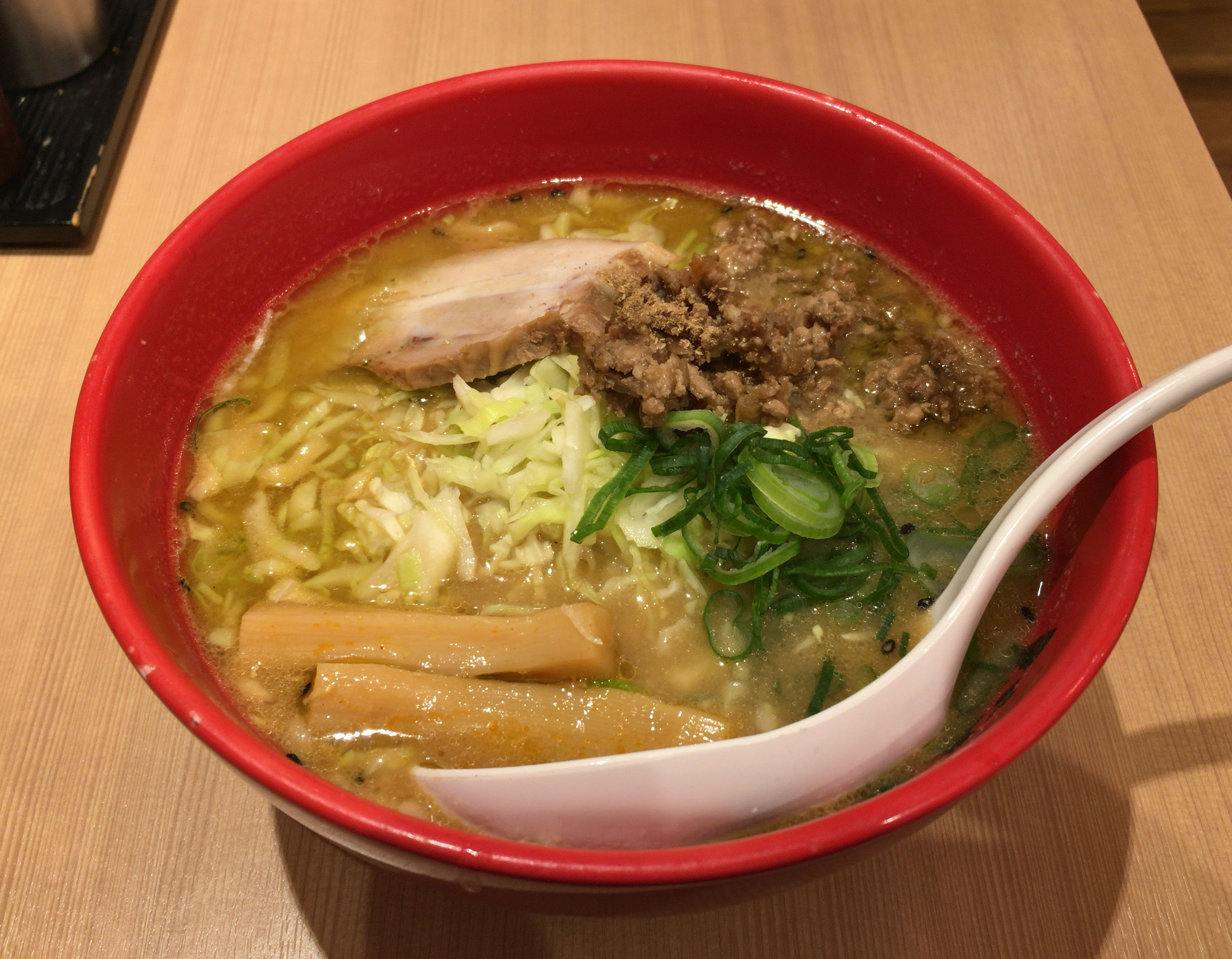
Miso ramen

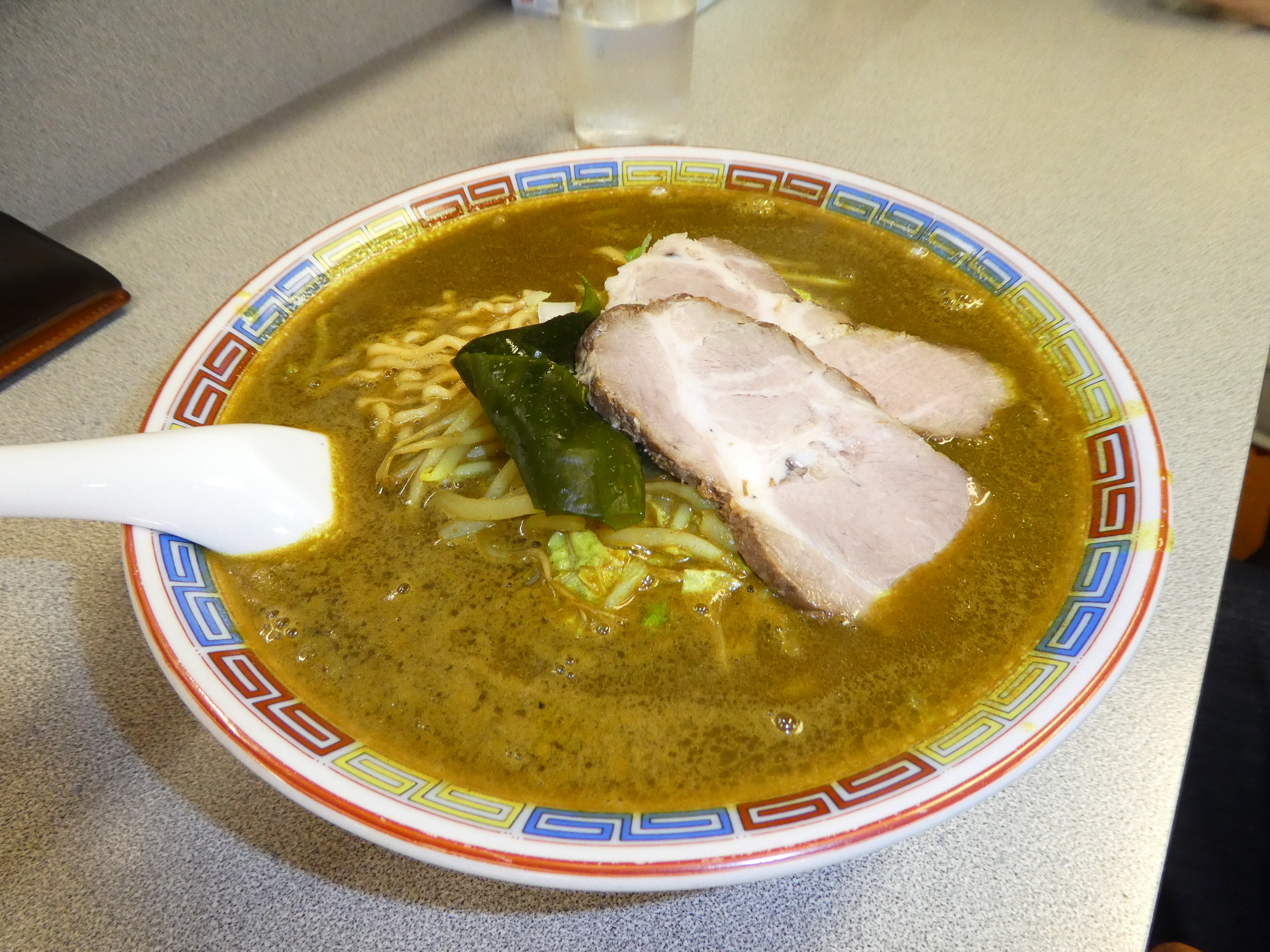
Karē ramen

Tare is a sauce that is used to flavor the broth. The main purpose of tare is to provide salt to the broth, but tare also usually adds other flavors, such as umami. There are three main kinds of tare.

- Shio (塩, 'salt') ramen is the oldest of the four types. This tare is made from cooking alcohols like mirin and sake, umami ingredients like kombu, niboshi and MSG, and salt. Occasionally pork bones are also used, but they are not boiled for as long as they are for tonkotsu ramen, so the soup remains light and clear. In shio ramen, chāshū is sometimes swapped for lean chicken meatballs, and pickled plums and kamaboko (a slice of processed fish roll sometimes served as a frilly white circle with a pink or red spiral called narutomaki) are popular toppings as well. Noodle texture and thickness varies among shio ramen, but they are usually straight rather than curly. Hakodate ramen is a well-known version of shio ramen in Japan.
- Shōyu (醤油, 'soy sauce') tare is similar to shio tare, but with the addition of soy sauce, which boosts the salty and umami flavor even further. Adding a soy sauce seasoning to the serving bowl before the soup and noodles is a common preparation method for noodle soups from Shanghai and Jiangsu, as can be seen in the Chinese dish yangchunmian. Ramen usually has curly noodles rather than straight ones, although this is not always the case. It is often adorned with marinated bamboo shoots or menma, scallions, ninjin ('carrot'), kamaboko ('fish cakes'), nori ('seaweed'), boiled eggs, bean sprouts or black pepper; occasionally the soup will also contain chili oil or Chinese spices, and some shops serve sliced beef instead of the usual chāshū.
- Miso (味噌) ramen reached national prominence around 1965. This uniquely Japanese ramen, which was developed in Sapporo, Hokkaido, features a broth that combines copious miso and is blended with oily chicken or fish broth – and sometimes with tonkotsu or lard – to create a thick, nutty, slightly sweet and very hearty soup. Miso ramen broth tends to have a robust, tangy flavor, so it stands up to a variety of flavorful toppings: spicy bean paste or tōbanjan (豆瓣醤), butter and corn, leeks, onions, bean sprouts, ground pork, cabbage, sesame seeds, white pepper, chilli and chopped garlic are common. The noodles are typically thick, curly, and slightly chewy.

=== Toppings ===
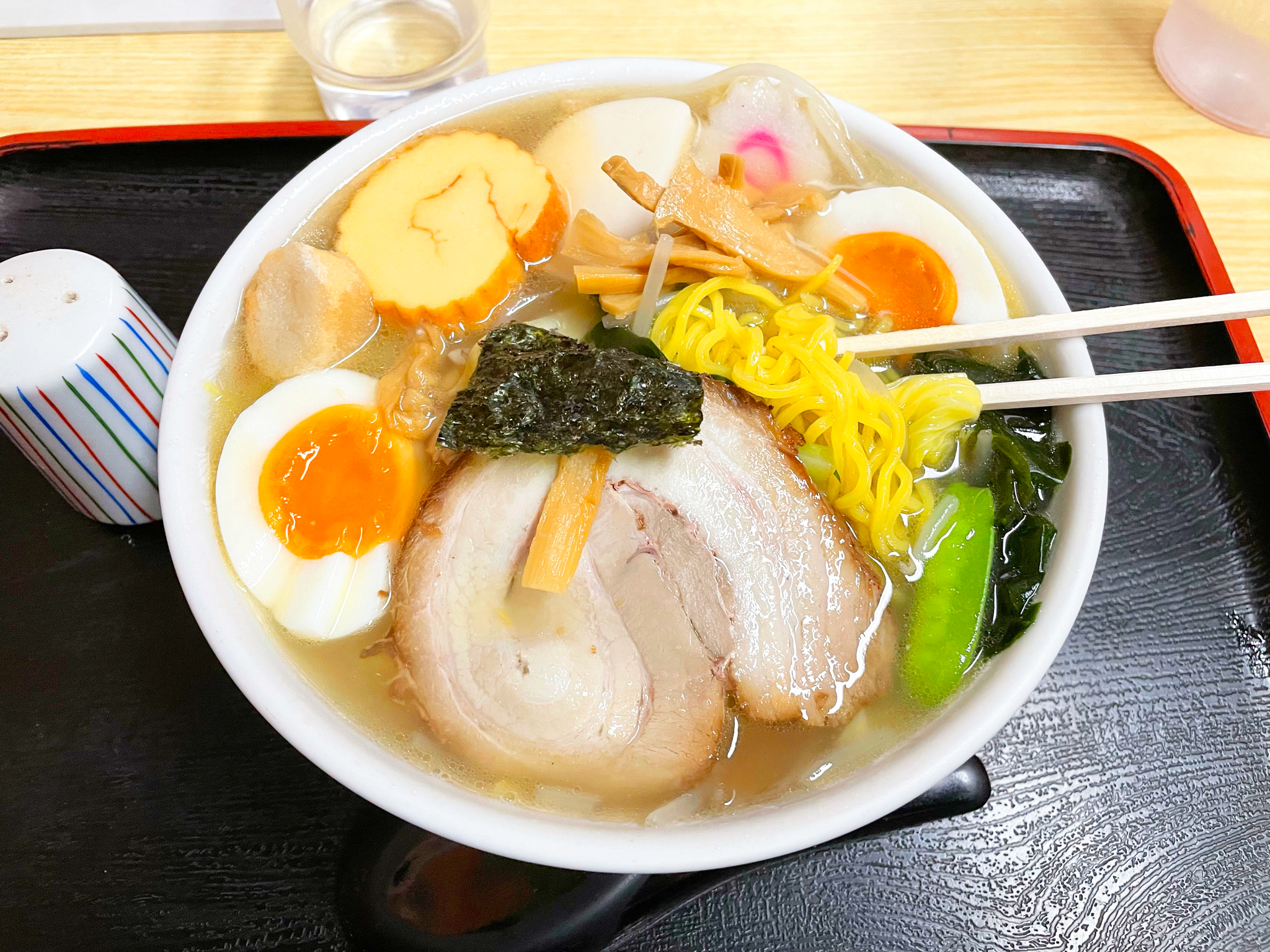
Gomoku ramen, sometimes called Gomoku soba

After basic preparation, ramen can be adorned with any number of toppings, including but not limited to:

- Chāshū (sliced roasted or red cooked pork)
- Negi (green onion)
- Takana-zuke (pickled and seasoned mustard leaves)
- Seasoned (usually salted) boiled egg (soy egg, ajitsuke tamago or ajitama)
- Niku soboro (seasoned and fried ground meat)
- Bean or other sprouts
- Menma (Chinese lacto-fermented bamboo shoots called sunsi), formerly known as shinachiku in Japan
- Kakuni (braised pork cubes or squares)
- Kikurage (wood ear mushroom)
- Nori (dried seaweed)
- Kamaboko (formed fish paste, often in a pink and white spiral called narutomaki)
- Squid
- Umeboshi (pickled plum)
- Corn
- Butter
- Wakame (a type of seaweed)
- Olive oil
- Sesame oil
- Mayu (black garlic oil)
- Chili crisp
- Other types of vegetables

=== Preference ===
Seasonings commonly added to ramen are white pepper, black pepper, butter, chili pepper, sesame seeds, and crushed garlic. Soup recipes and methods of preparation tend to be closely guarded secrets.

Most tonkotsu ramen restaurants offer a system known as kae-dama (替え玉), where customers who have finished their noodles can request a "refill" (for a few hundred yen more) to be put into their remaining soup.

== Regional variations ==
While standard versions of ramen are available throughout Japan since the Taishō period, the last few decades have shown a proliferation of regional variations, commonly referred to as gotouchi ramen (ご当地ラーメン "regional ramen"). Some of these which have gone on to national prominence are:

- Sapporo, the capital of Hokkaido, is especially famous for its ramen. Most people in Japan associate Sapporo with its rich miso ramen, which was invented there and which is ideal for Hokkaido's harsh, snowy winters. Sapporo miso ramen is typically topped with sweetcorn, butter, bean sprouts, finely chopped pork, and garlic, and sometimes local seafood such as scallop, squid, and crab. Hakodate, another city of Hokkaido, is famous for its salt-flavored ramen, while Asahikawa in the north of the island offers a soy sauce-flavored variation. In Muroran, many ramen restaurants offer Muroran curry ramen.
- Kitakata ramen is known for its rather thick, flat, curly noodles served in a pork-and-niboshi broth. The area within the former city limits has the highest per-capita number of ramen establishments. Ramen has such prominence in the region that locally, the word soba usually refers to ramen, and not to actual soba which is referred to as nihon soba ('Japanese soba').
- Tokyo-style ramen consists of slightly thin, curly noodles served in a soy-flavored chicken broth. The Tokyo-style broth typically has a touch of dashi, as old ramen establishments in Tokyo often originate from soba eateries. Standard toppings are chopped scallion, menma, sliced pork, kamaboko, egg, nori, and spinach. Ikebukuro, Ogikubo and Ebisu are three areas in Tokyo known for their ramen.
- Yokohama ramen specialty is called Ie-kei (家系). It consists of thick, straight noodles served in a soy flavored pork broth similar to tonkotsu, sometimes referred to as, tonkotsu-shoyu. The standard toppings are braised pork (chāshū), boiled spinach, sheets of nori, often with shredded Welsh onion (negi) and a soft- or hard-boiled egg. It is traditional for customers to customize the softness of the noodles, the richness of the broth and the amount of oil they want.
- Wakayama ramen in the Kansai region has a broth made from soy sauce and pork bones.
- Hakata ramen originates from Hakata district of Fukuoka city in Kyushu. It has a rich, milky, pork-bone tonkotsu broth and rather thin, non-curly and resilient noodles. Often, distinctive toppings such as crushed garlic, beni shōga (pickled ginger), sesame seeds, and spicy pickled mustard greens (karashi takana) are left on tables for customers to serve themselves. Ramen stalls in Hakata and Tenjin are well known within Japan. Recent trends have made Hakata ramen one of the most popular types in Japan, and several chain restaurants specializing in Hakata ramen can be found all over the country.
- Tofu ramen is a specialty of Iwatsuki ward in Saitama City.
- Nabeyaki ramen is a specialty of Susaki City, as well as other cities in western Kōchi Prefecture. Nabeyaki ramen is made with a chicken-based broth, thin noodles and a soy tare, all served boiling hot in an enamelled pot. Toppings vary, but mainstays include a raw egg that poaches in the bowl, sliced spring onions and chikuwa fish cakes.
- Nagoya ramen specialties include "Taiwan ramen", which despite its name originated in Nagoya and features a very spicy broth. It became famous in the 1980s during a fad for super hot food. It bears some resemblance to danzai noodles but has both a spicy broth and spicy minced meat resulting in an extremely spicy dish.
- Kagoshima ramen – a ramen dish offered in the Kagoshima Prefecture in southern Japan, it is mainly based on tonkotsu (pork bone broth). It is a little cloudy, and chicken stock, vegetables, dried sardines, kelp and dried mushrooms are added.
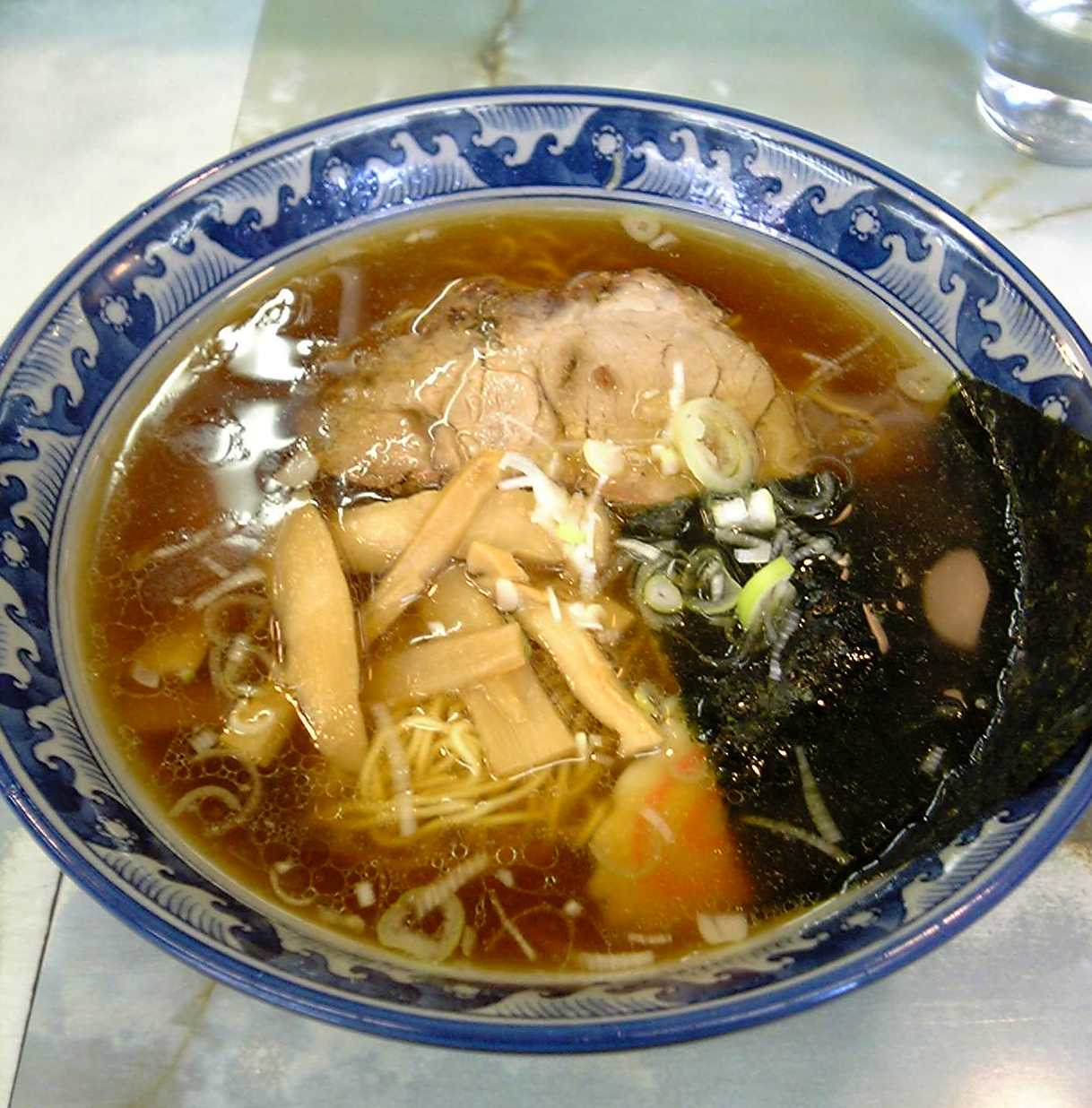
Tokyo-style ramen

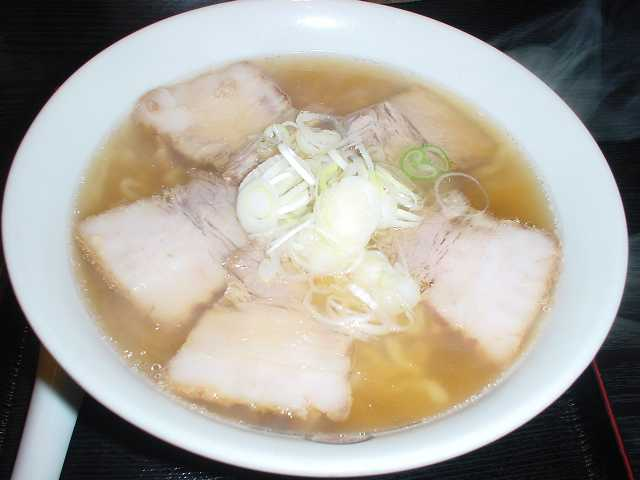
Kitakata ramen

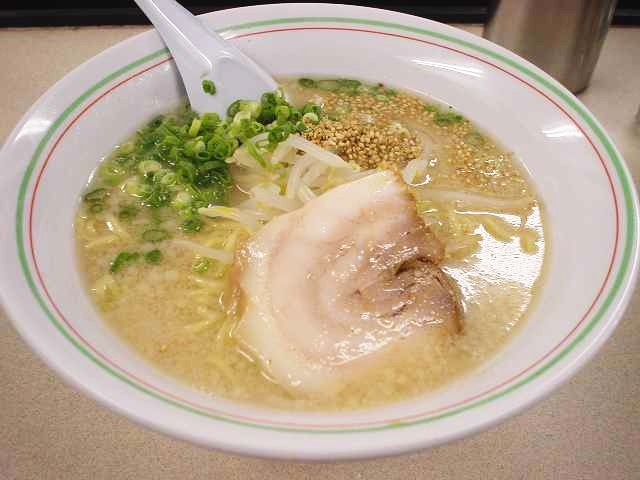
Hakata ramen with tonkotsu soup

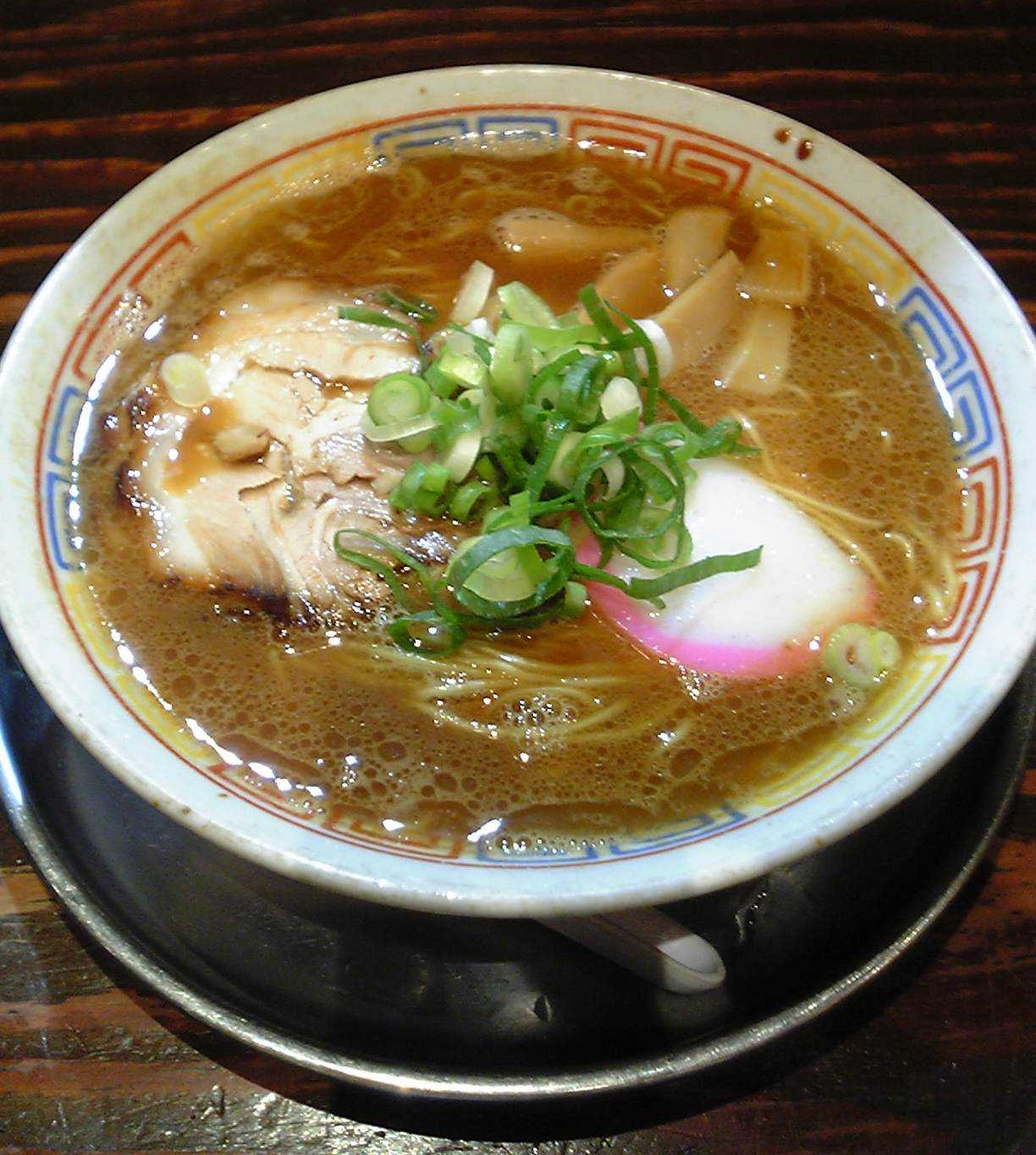
Wakayama ramen

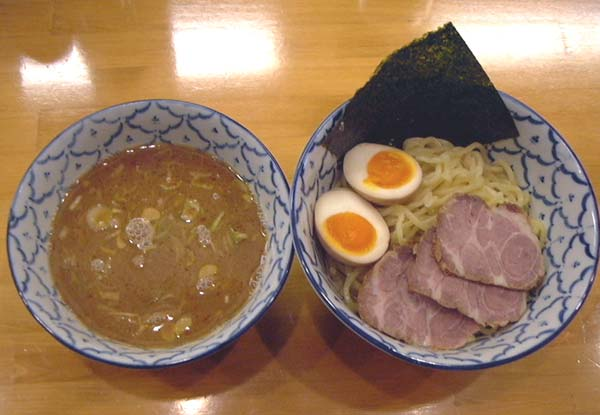
Tsukemen dipping ramen

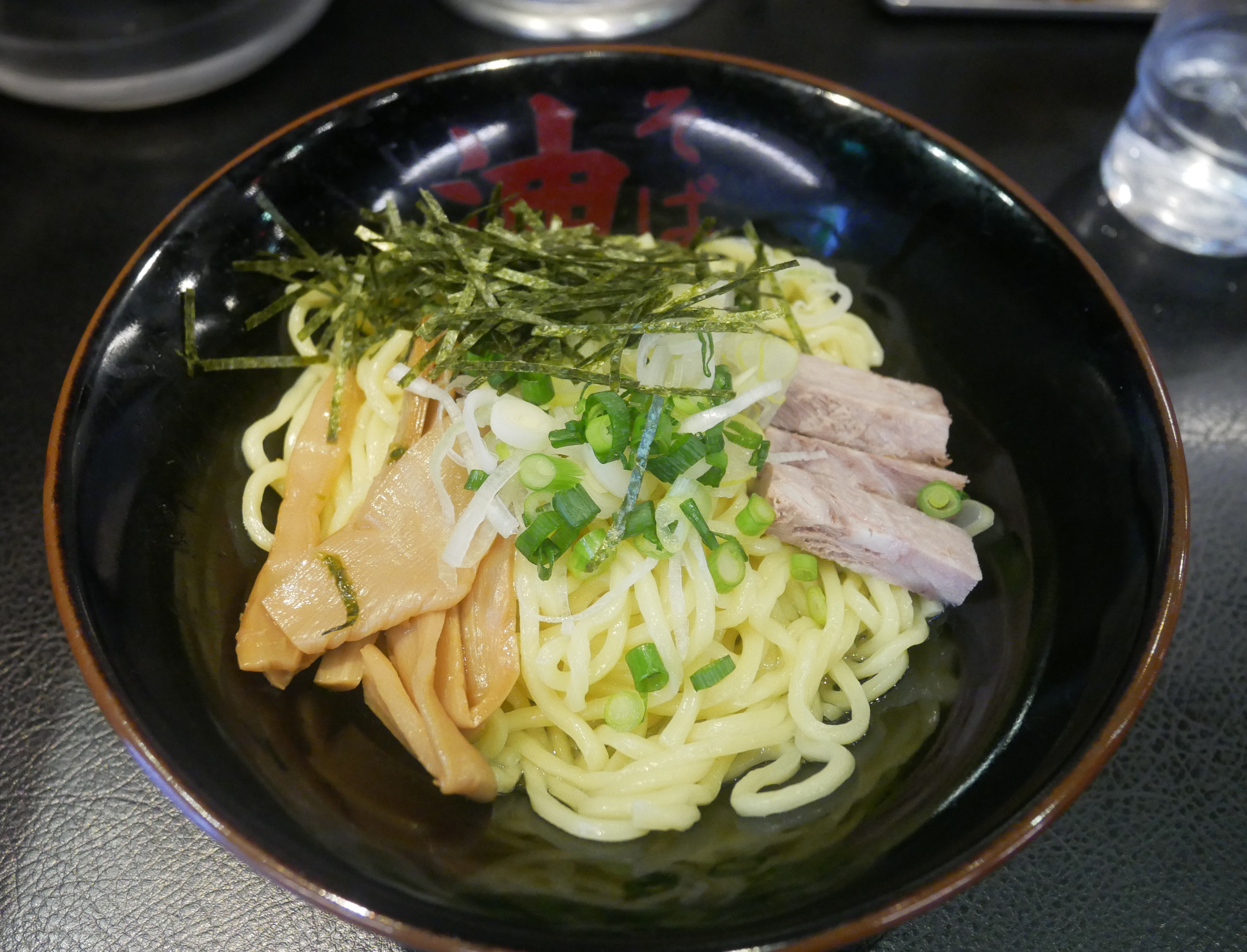
Aburasoba ('oiled noodles')

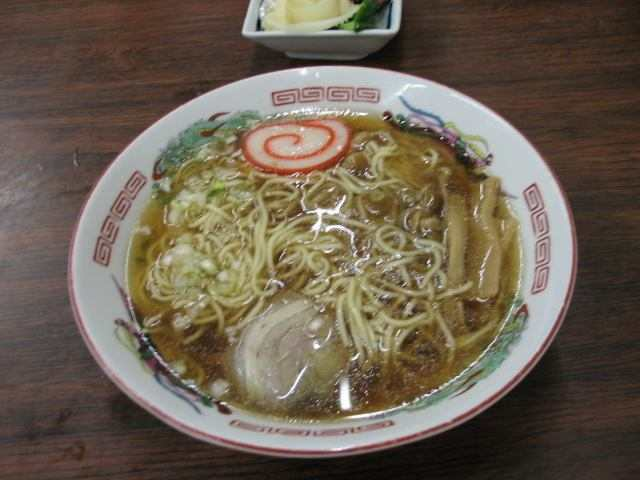
Takayama ramen

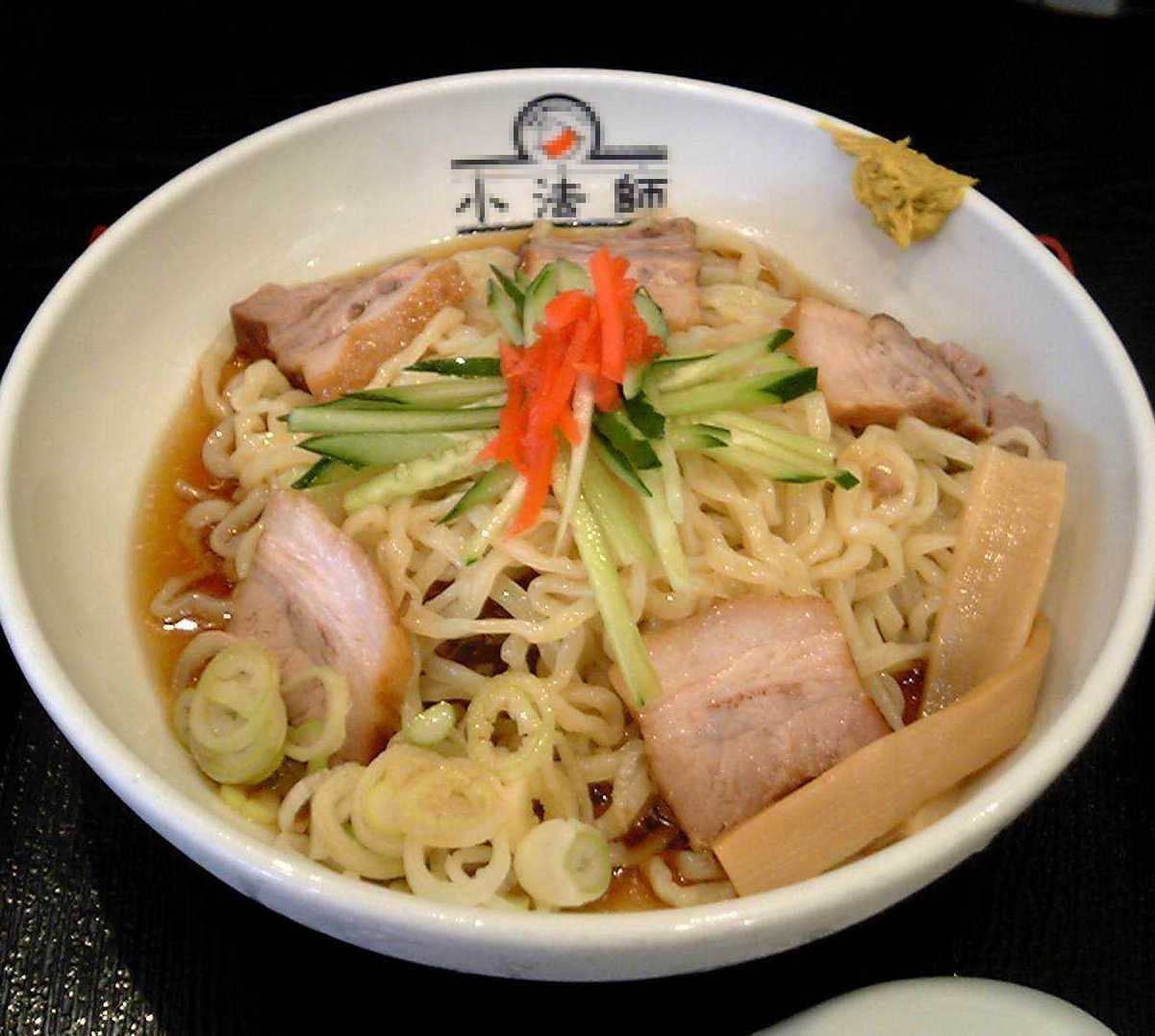
Hiyashi (chilled) ramen

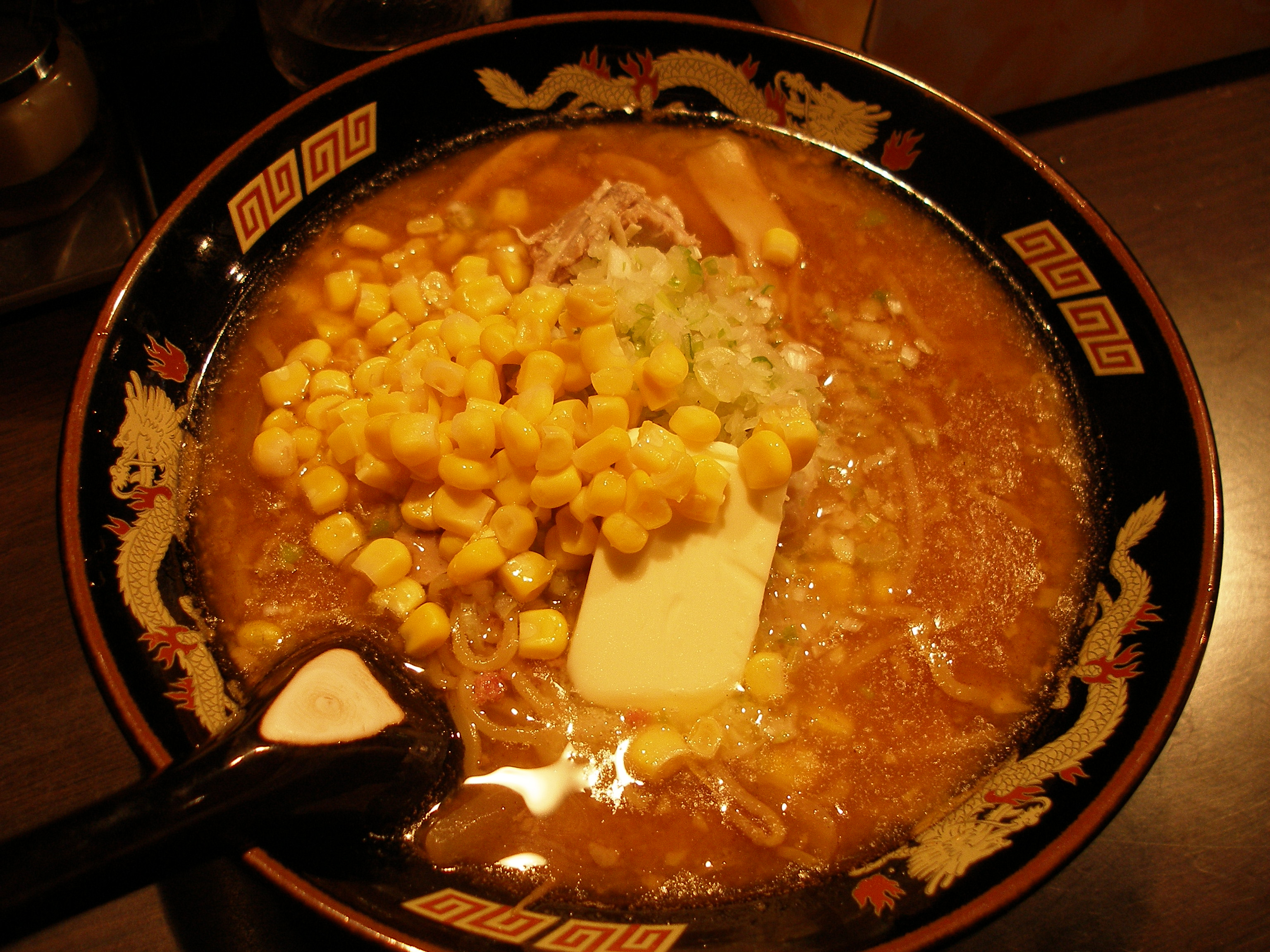
Butter corn ramen, specialty of Hokkaido

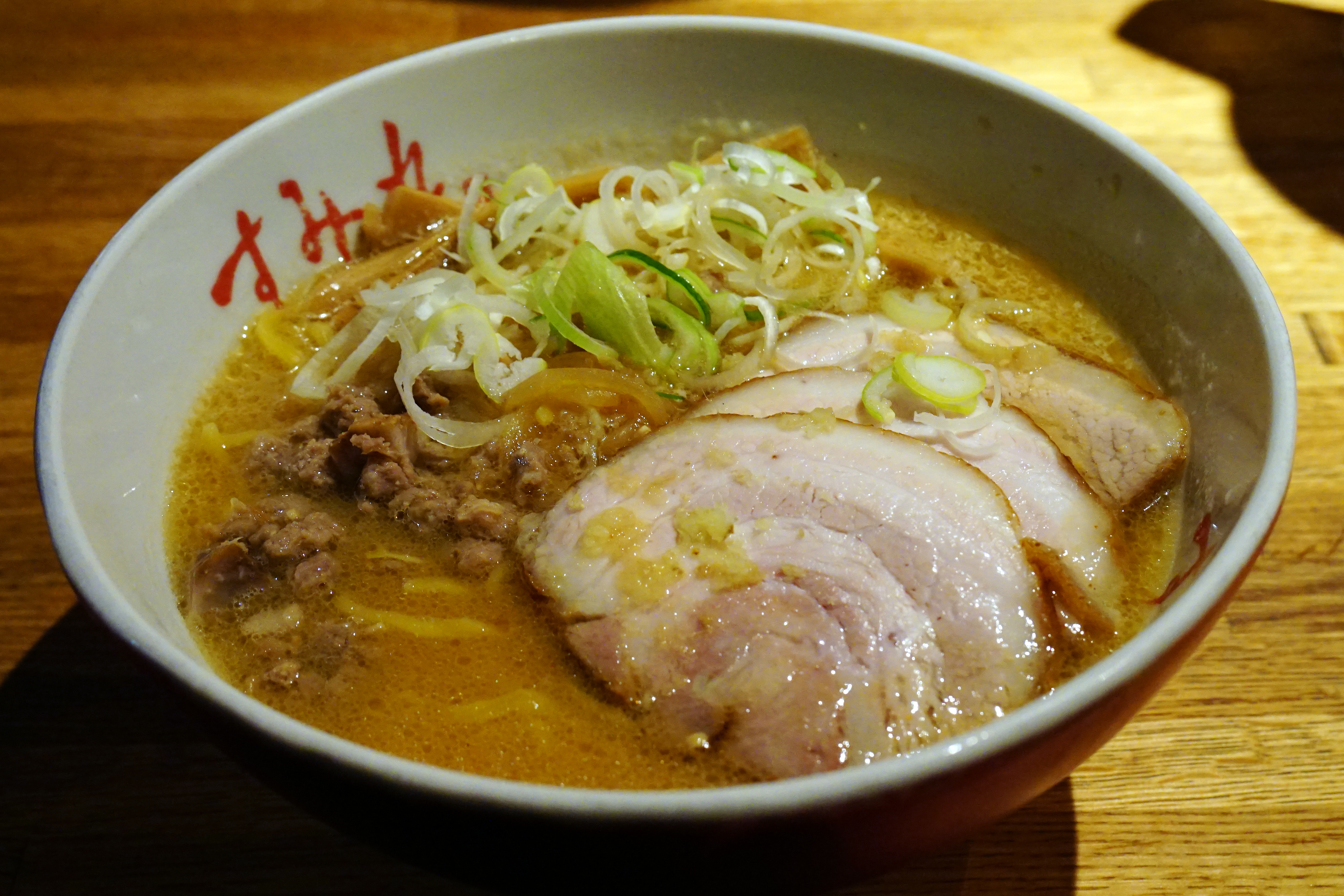
Sapporo-style ramen

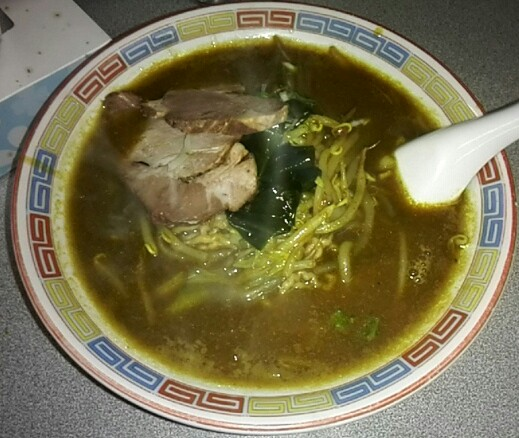
Muroran curry ramen

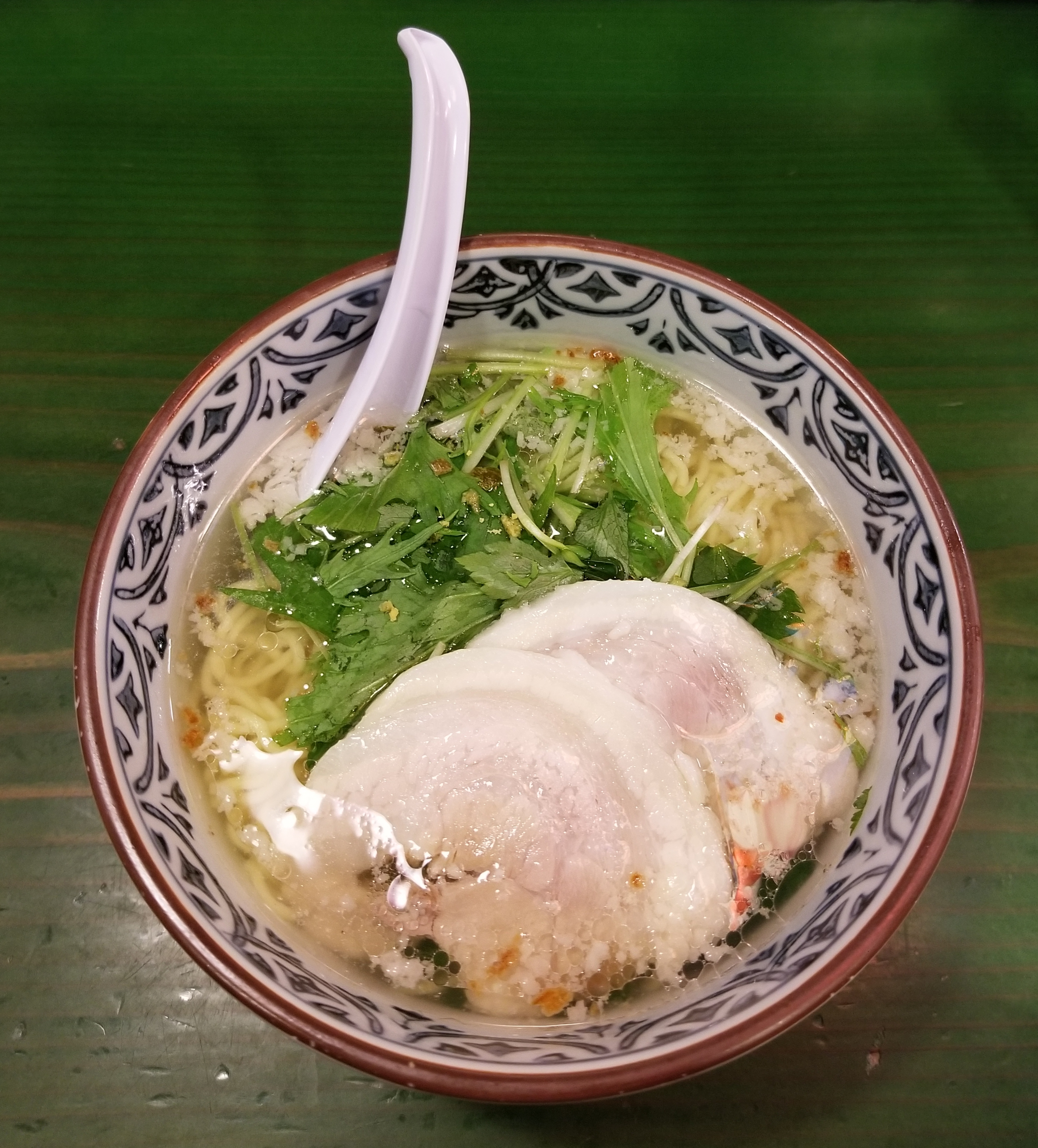
Ryukyuan shio ramen

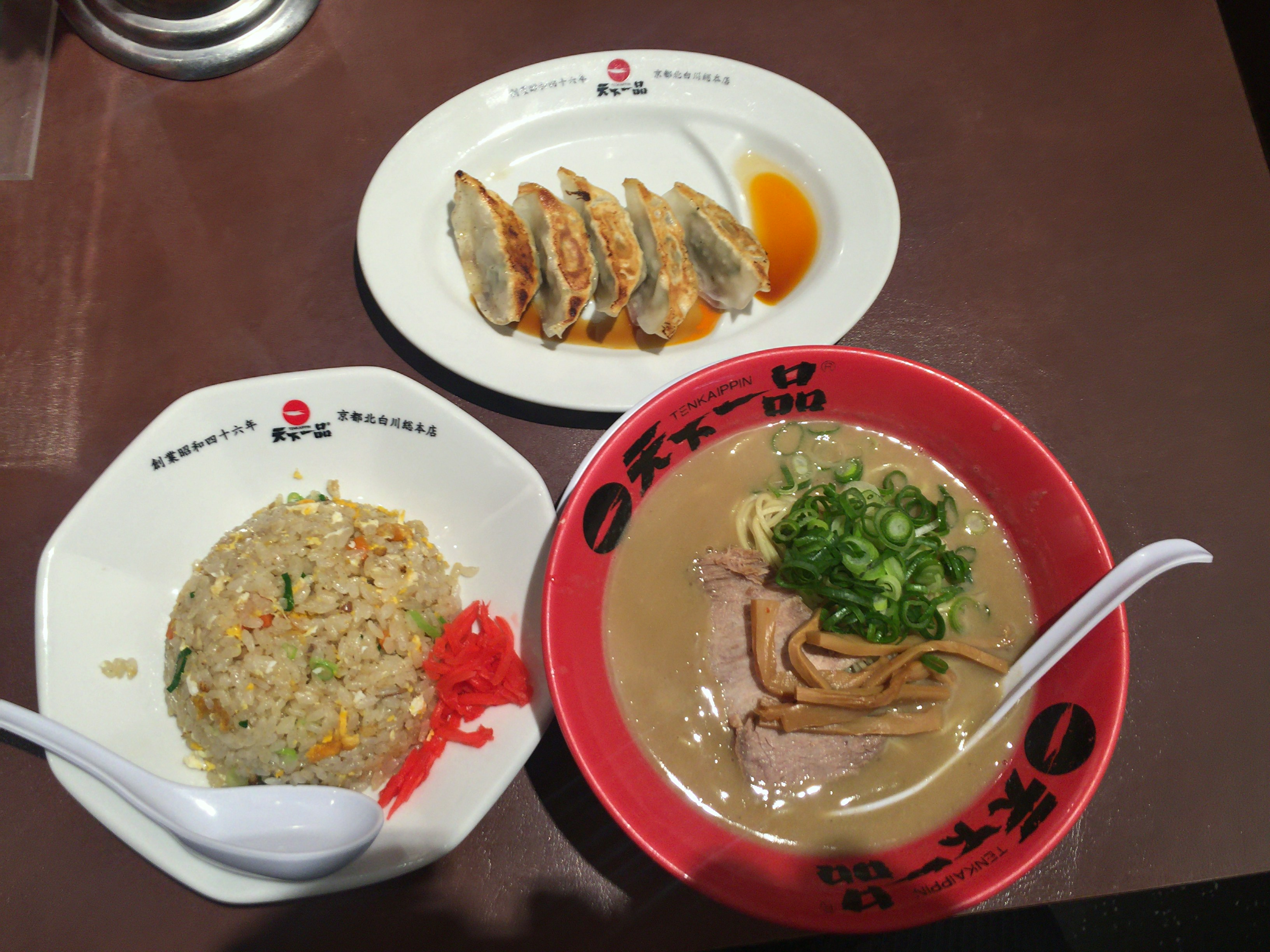
Ramen, chahan with a side of gyoza

== Related dishes ==
There are many related, Chinese-influenced noodle dishes in Japan. The following are often served alongside ramen in ramen establishments. They do not include noodle dishes considered traditionally Japanese, such as soba or udon, which are almost never served in the same establishments as ramen.

- Nagasaki champon. Japanese version of Fujianese menmian (焖面). The noodles are thicker than ramen but thinner than udon. Champon is topped with a variety of ingredients, mostly seafood, stir-fried and dressed in a starchy sauce. The stir-fried ingredients are poured directly over the cooked noodles, with the sauce acting as a soup.
- Tan-men derived is a mild, usually salty soup, served with a mix of sautéed vegetables and seafood/pork. The name is derived from the generic Chinese term for any wheat noodle soup (汤面; tāngmiàn). The origins of tanmen are attributed to Japanese chefs who repatriated from the puppet state of Manchukuo after World War II and sought to recreate the flavors of the Chinese home-style cooking they had encountered. Not to be confused with tantan-men (see after).
- Wantan-men. Japanese version of Cantonese wonton noodles. It has long, straight noodles and wonton, served in a mild, usually salty soup.
- Tsukemen ('dipping noodles'). The noodles and soup are served in separate bowls. The diner dips the noodles in the soup before eating. Can be served hot or chilled.

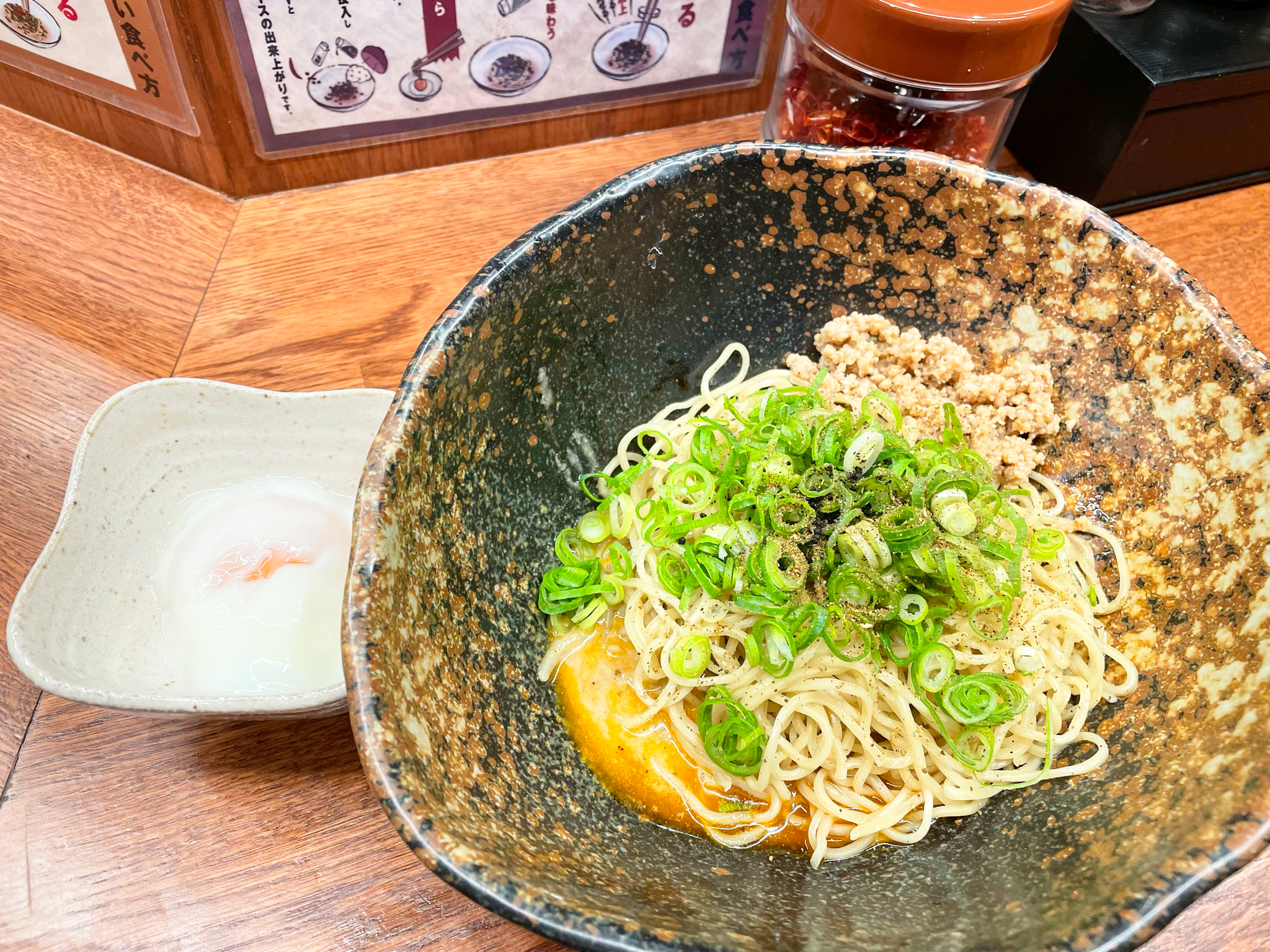
Hiroshma-type Tantan-men, or soupless dandan noodle

- Tantan-men (担担麺). Japanese version of Sichuanese dan dan noodles. Ramen in a reddish, spicy chili and sesame soup, usually containing minced pork, garnished with chopped scallion and chili and occasionally topped with spinach or bok choi (chingensai).
- Sūrātanmen or sanrātanmen (酸辣湯麺, 'noodles in hot and sour soup'). Japanese version of Sichuanese hot and sour soup, but served with long noodles. The topping ingredients are sautéed and a thickener is added before the mix is poured on the soup and the noodles.
- Aburasoba ('oil-noodles'). Ramen and toppings served without the soup, but with a small quantity of oily soy-based sauce instead.
- Hiyashi-chūka (冷やし中華, 'chilled Chinese'). Japanese version of Shanghainese liangbanmian (凉拌面). The dish was originally sold in Japan under the borrowed Chinese name ryanbanmyen. It is a summer dish of chilled ramen on a plate with various toppings (typically thin strips of omelet, ham, cucumber and tomato) and served with a vinegary soy dressing and karashi (Japanese mustard). It was first produced at the Ryutei, a Chinese restaurant in Sendai. It is also known as reimen, especially in western Japan.

== Restaurants in Japan ==
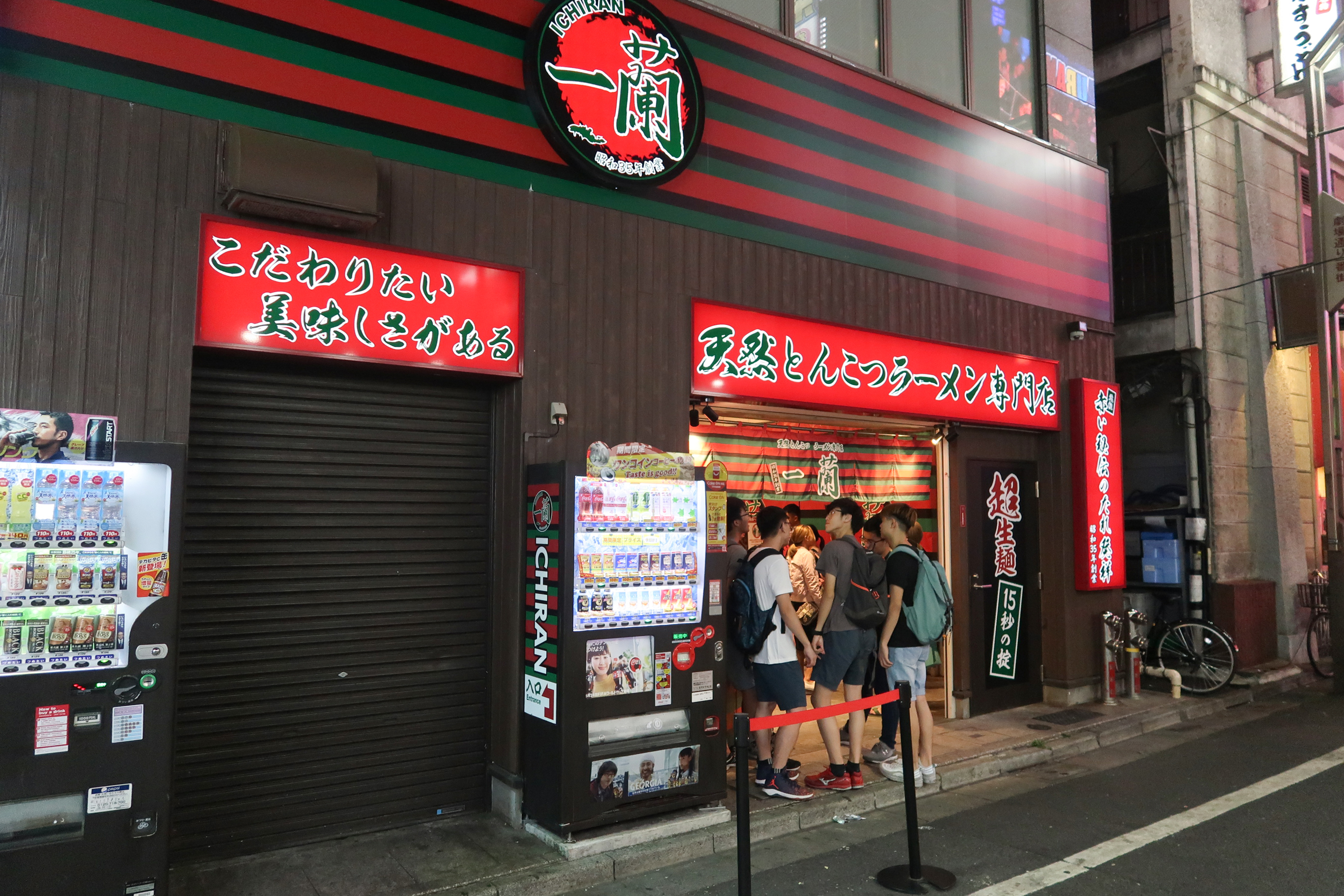
An Ichiran ramen restaurant in Shinjuku Kabukicho

Ramen is offered in various types of restaurants and locations including ramen shops, izakaya drinking establishments, lunch cafeterias, karaoke halls, and amusement parks. Many ramen restaurants only have a counter and a chef. In these shops, the meals are paid for in advance at a ticket machine to streamline the process. Some restaurants also provide halal ramen (using chicken) in Osaka and Kyoto.

However, the best quality ramen is usually only available in specialist ramen-ya restaurants. As ramen-ya restaurants offer mainly ramen dishes, they tend to lack variety in the menu. Besides ramen, some of the dishes generally available in a ramen-ya restaurant include other dishes from Japanese Chinese cuisine such as fried rice (called chahan or yakimeshi), jiaozi (called gyoza), and alcohol. Ramen-ya often feature Chinese-inspired decorations. The bowls used to serve ramen may be designed to include Chinese motifs such as yunleiwen, loong, fenghuang, and the character for double happiness. Chinese spoons are more commonly used to drink the soup in ramen, as opposed to the Japanese ladle (otamajakushi), which is typically used for soba and udon.

From January 2020 to September 2021 during the COVID-19 pandemic, many ramen restaurants were temporarily closed, with 34 chains filing for bankruptcy by September 2020. Ramen restaurants are typically narrow and seat customers closely, making social distancing difficult.

== Outside Japan ==
Ramen became popular in China where it is known as rìshì lāmiàn (日式拉麵, lit. 'Japanese-style lamian'). Restaurant chains serve ramen alongside Japanese dishes, such as tempura and yakitori. In Japan, these dishes are not traditionally served with ramen, but gyoza, kara-age, and others from Japanese Chinese cuisine.

In Korea, there is a variation of ramen called ramyeon (라면; 拉麵), made much spicier than ramen. There are different varieties, such as kimchi-flavored ramyeon. While usually served with egg or vegetables such as carrots and scallions, some restaurants serve variations of ramyeon containing additional ingredients such as dumplings, tteok, or cheese as toppings. Famous ramyeon brands include Shin Ramyeon and Buldak Ramyeon.

Outside of Asia, particularly in areas with a large demand for Asian cuisine, there are restaurants specializing in Japanese-style foods such as ramen noodles. For example, Wagamama, a UK-based restaurant chain serving pan-Asian food, serves a ramen noodle soup and in the United States and Canada, Jinya Ramen Bar serves tonkotsu ramen.

Chef Antonio de Livier of Mexico City is credited with a Mexican variation called birriamen (a portmanteau of birria and ramen) where the broth incorporates the consomé broth that the beef, lamb or goat is cooked in. The variation later gained popularity in the Los Angeles area.

== Instant ramen ==
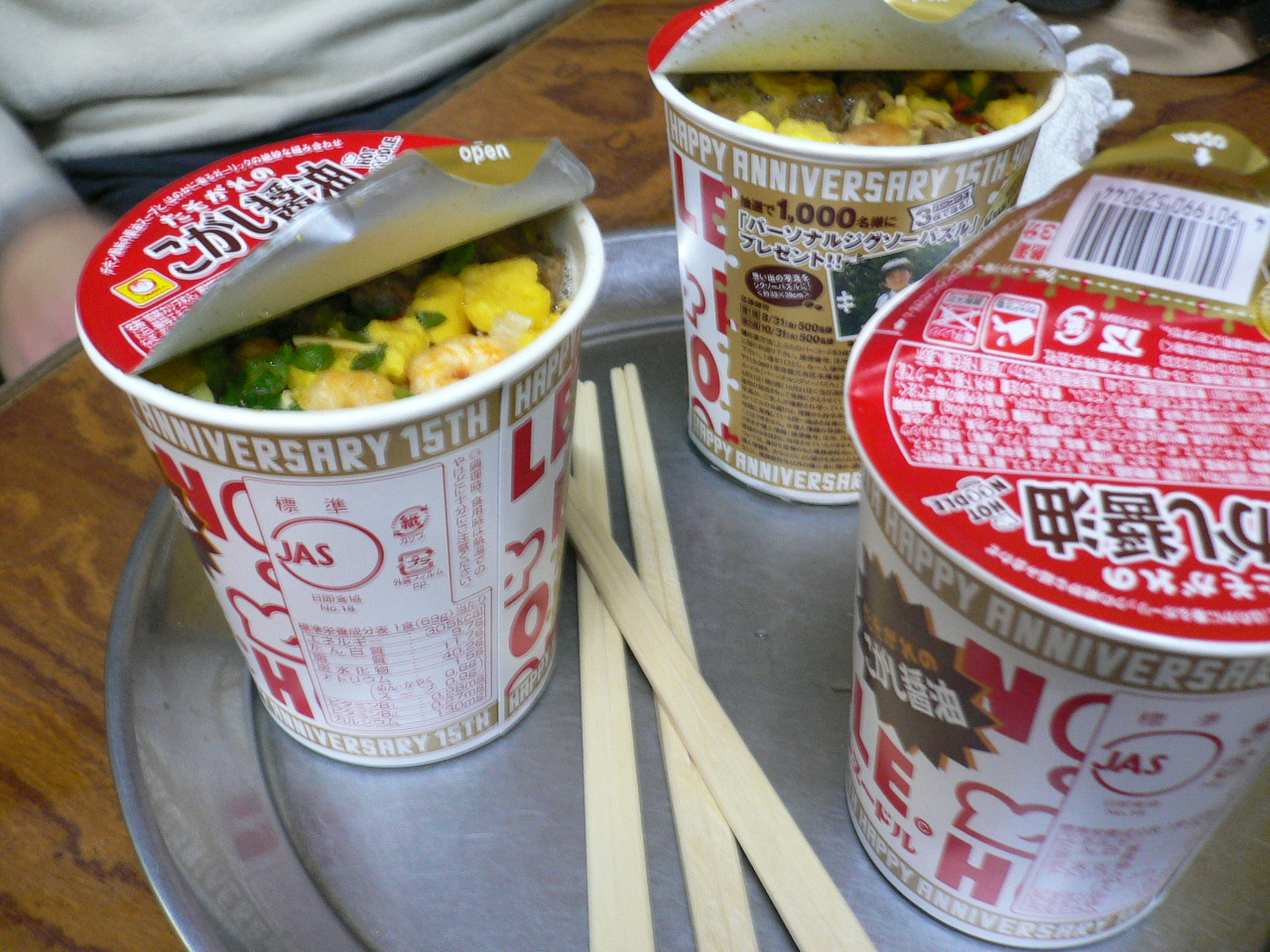
Instant ramen in Japan

Instant ramen noodles were exported from Japan by Nissin Foods starting in 1971, bearing the name "Oodles of Noodles". One year later, it was rebranded as "Nissin Cup Noodles" and packaged in a foam food container (this is referred to as Cup Ramen in Japan), and subsequently saw growth of international sales. Over time, the term ramen became used in North America to refer to other instant noodles.

While some research has claimed that consuming instant ramen two or more times a week increases the likelihood of developing heart disease and other conditions, including diabetes and stroke, especially in women, those claims have not been reproduced and no study has isolated instant ramen consumption as an aggravating factor. However, instant ramen noodles, known to have a serving of 43 g, contain very high sodium. At least 1,760 mg of sodium are found in one packet alone. It consists of 385 kilocalories, 55.7 g of carbohydrates, 14.5 g of total fat, 6.5 g of saturated fat, 7.9 g of protein, and 0.6 mg of thiamine.

=== Canned version ===
In Akihabara, Tokyo, vending machines distribute warm ramen in a steel can known as ramen kan (らーめん缶). It is produced by a popular local ramen restaurant in flavors such as tonkotsu and curry, and contains noodles, soup, menma, and pork. It is intended as a quick snack, and includes a small folded plastic fork.

== In popular culture ==
=== Emoji ===
In October 2010, an emoji was approved for Unicode 6.0 U+1F35C 🍜 STEAMING BOWL for "Steaming Bowl", that depicts Japanese ramen noodles in a bowl of steaming broth with chopsticks. In 2015, the icon was added to Emoji 1.0. According to Emojipedia, most platforms depict the emoji as Japanese ramen, "though it can represent a warm meal more generally".

=== Film ===
The main storyline of Tampopo, a 1985 Japanese comedy billed as the first "ramen western" (a play on the "spaghetti Western" subgenre), concerns a trucker helping a widowed ramen shop owner reach the top of her craft.

In 2008's The Ramen Girl, an American woman is stranded in Tokyo after breaking up with her boyfriend. Looking for direction in life, she trains to be a ramen chef under a dictatorial Japanese master.

=== Museum ===
The Shin-Yokohama Ramen Museum is a museum about ramen, in the Shin-Yokohama district of Kōhoku-ku, Yokohama.

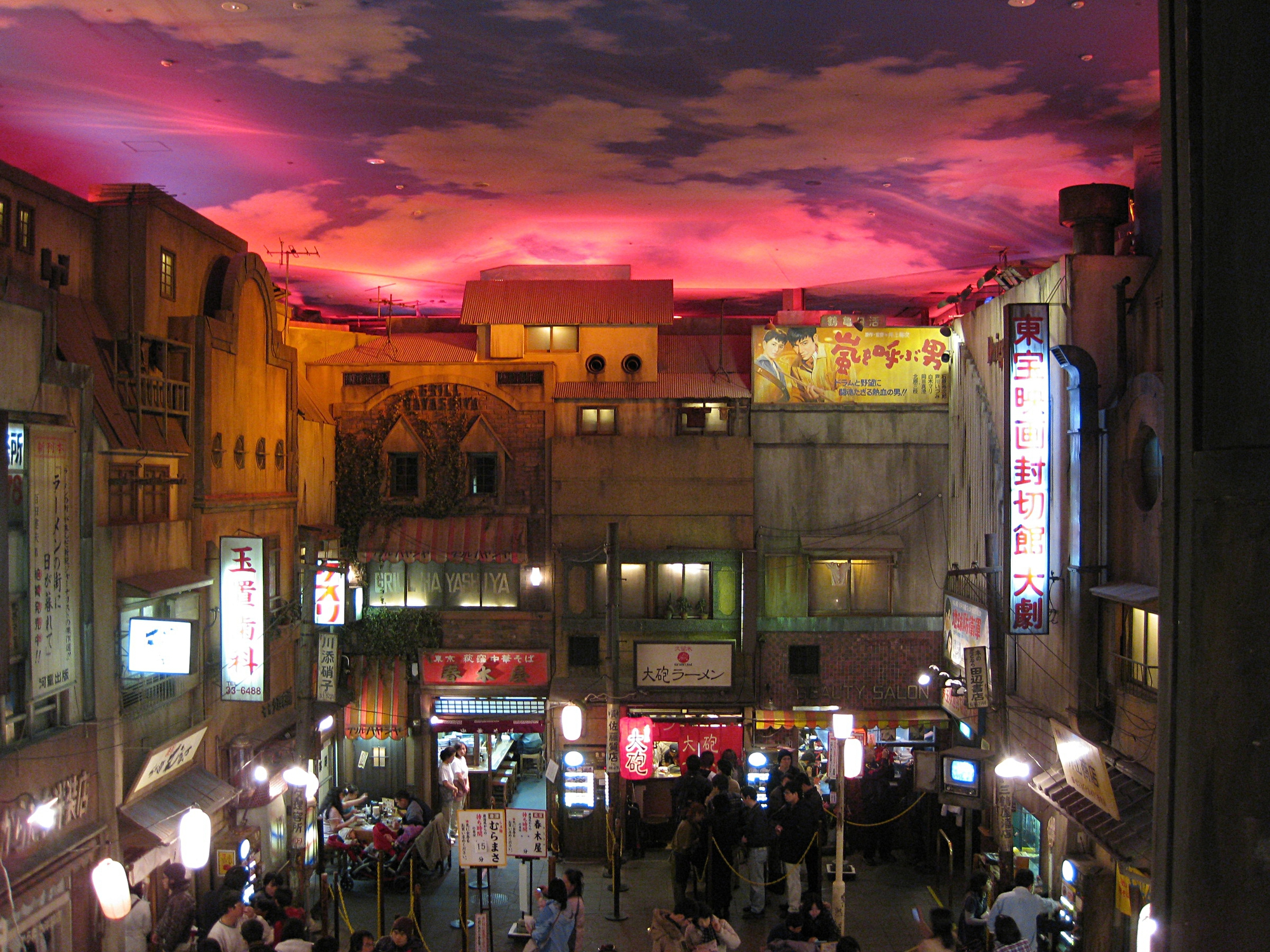
Shin-Yokohama Rāmen Museum

== See also ==
- List of Japanese soups and stews
- List of noodle dishes
- List of ramen dishes
- List of soups
- Laghman
- Lo mein
- Pot Noodle
- Hawaiian saimin
- Shirataki noodles
- Tare sauce
- Laksa (Southeast Asia)
- Beef noodles
- Yaki ramen (jp) – It is a type of stir-fried ramen noodles, typically prepared on a teppan (iron griddle).
