= List of noodle restaurants =

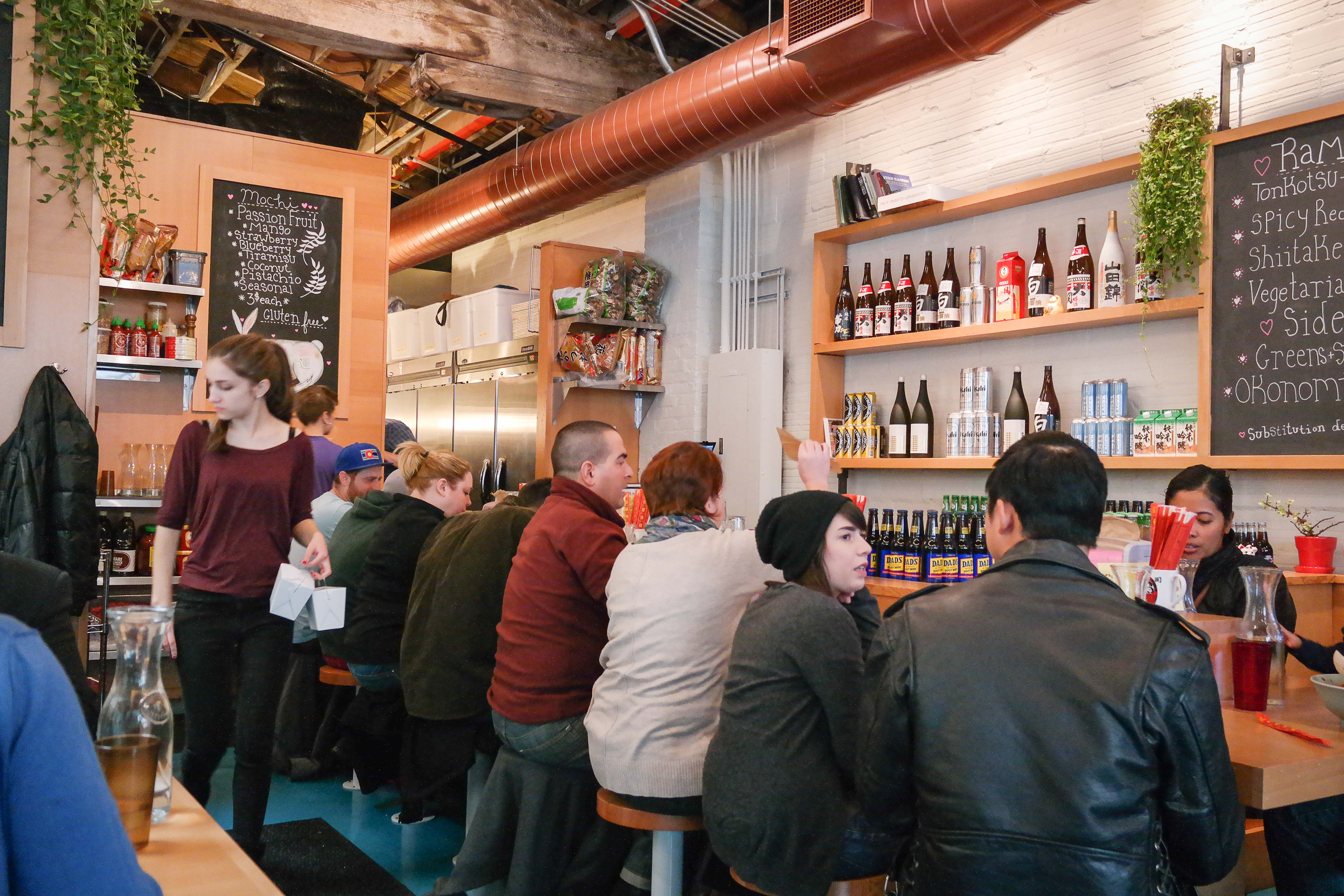
Boxer Ramen, Portland, Oregon

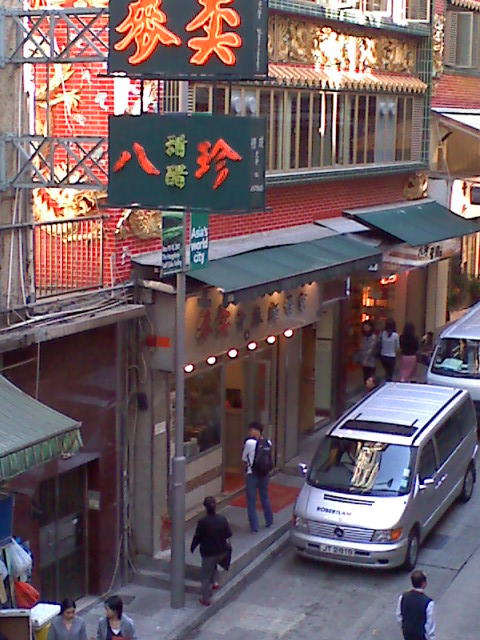
Mak's Noodle, Hong Kong

This is a list of notable noodle restaurants, which are restaurants that specialize in noodle dishes.

== Noodle restaurants ==
- Afuri, Shinjuku, Tokyo
- Ajisen Ramen
- Bakmi GM, Indonesia
- Boxer Ramen, Portland, Oregon, U.S.
- Handpulled Noodle, New York City, U.S.
- Hakata Gensuke, Australia
- Hapa PDX, Portland, Oregon
- Ichiran
- Ippudo, Fukuoka, Japan
- Ivan Ramen, New York City, U.S.
- Jinya Ramen Bar, Canada and U.S.
- Kau Kee Restaurant, Hong Kong
- Kinboshi Ramen, Oregon, U.S.
- Mak's Noodle, Hong Kong
- Marugame Seimen, Hyōgo, Japan
- Master Kong Chef's Table
- Momofuku, New York, U.S.
- Momofuku Ando Instant Ramen Museum
- Mr. Lee, Haidian District, Beijing
- Muteppou, Kyoto, Japan
- Noodle Box, Victoria, Australia
- Noodles & Company, Colorado, U.S.
- Ooink, Seattle, U.S.
- Okryu-gwan, Pyongyang, North Korea
- Sam Woo Restaurant, Ontario, Canada
- Shin-Yokohama Raumen Museum, Yokohama, Japan
- Wagamama, London, United Kingdom
- Wong's King, Oregon, U.S.
- Yank Sing, San Francisco, U.S.

== See also ==
- List of noodles
- List of noodle dishes
- List of instant noodle brands
- Lists of restaurants
- Ramen shop
- Ramen Street
