= Master Kong (disambiguation) =

Master Kong is the largest instant noodle producer in China.

Master Kong may also refer to:

- Master Kong Chef's Table, a restaurant chain operated by the food company
- Master Kong (restaurant), Portland, Oregon, U.S.
- Confucius, the latinization of the Chinese name Kongfuzi for which the literal meaning is "Master Kong"
