= Ajisen Ramen =

Japanese fast food restaurant chain

- Company logo
- Native name: 味千ラーメン
- Industry: Foodservice
- Founded: Japan
- Number of locations: Over 700
- Products: Ramen
- Website: Ajisen Ramen Japan

Ajisen Ramen (Japanese: 味千ラーメン, simplified Chinese: 味千拉面; traditional Chinese: 味千拉麵; pinyin: Wèiqiān Lāmiàn) is a Japan-based chain of fast food restaurants selling Japanese ramen noodle soup dishes. The company's logo, featuring artwork of a little girl named Chii-chan, can be found on their stores and products. Outside of Japan, Ajisen Ramen has outlets in Australia, Cambodia, Canada, China, Egypt, Hong Kong, Indonesia, Malaysia, the Marianas, Mongolia, New Zealand, the Philippines, Singapore, South Korea, Thailand, the United States, Vietnam, Morocco and Panama. There are over 700 Ajisen Ramen restaurants.

== History ==
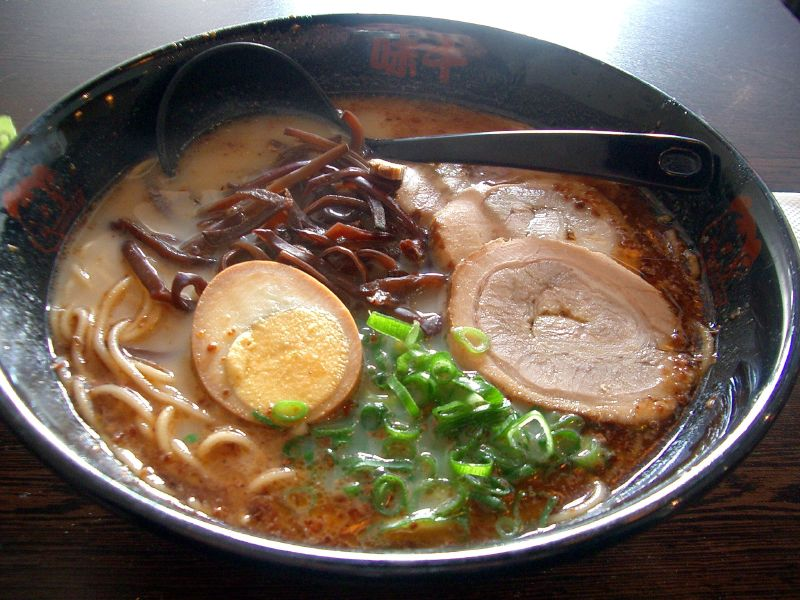
Ajisen Ramen noodle soup served at Melbourne

- 1968 – Pork bone white soup based Tonkotsu ramen from Kurume, Fukuoka was modified with garlic flavour by a Hakka person from Meinong, Taiwan in Kumamoto, Japan. He is the founder Takaharu Shigemitsu (Japanese: 重光孝治 Shigemitsu Takaharu), or original name Liu Tan Hsiang (Chinese: 劉壇祥).
- 1972 – Shigemitsu Industry Co., Ltd. was incorporated and a noodle and soup factory was established. Franchising was started by the company.
- 1994 – The first oversea joint venture business was started at Taipei, Taiwan. It ended three years later without success.
- 1996 – With the death of Takaharu Shigemitsu, his son Katsuaki Shigemitsu took over the business. Daisy Poon (Chinese: 潘慰) opened the first store in Hong Kong under license of Ajisen Ramen.
- 2007 – Ajisen Ramen (China) Ltd. was listed on the Hong Kong Stock Exchange.

== Locations ==
=== Japan ===
- Hokkaido
- Tohoku - Aomori Prefecture
- Kanto - Ibaraki Prefecture
- Chubu - Shizuoka Prefecture, Nagano Prefecture, Nagoya, Gifu Prefecture
- Kansai - Osaka Prefecture, Wakayama Prefecture
- Chugoku-Shikoku - Hiroshima Prefecture, Kochi Prefecture, Ehime Prefecture
- Kyushu - Fukuoka Prefecture, Saga Prefecture, Nagasaki Prefecture, Oita Prefecture, Miyazaki Prefecture
  - Kumamoto Prefecture - about 70 stores
- Okinawa Prefecture

=== Hong Kong ===
There are several locations in Hong Kong, with one of them being at the Hong Kong International Airport.

=== China ===
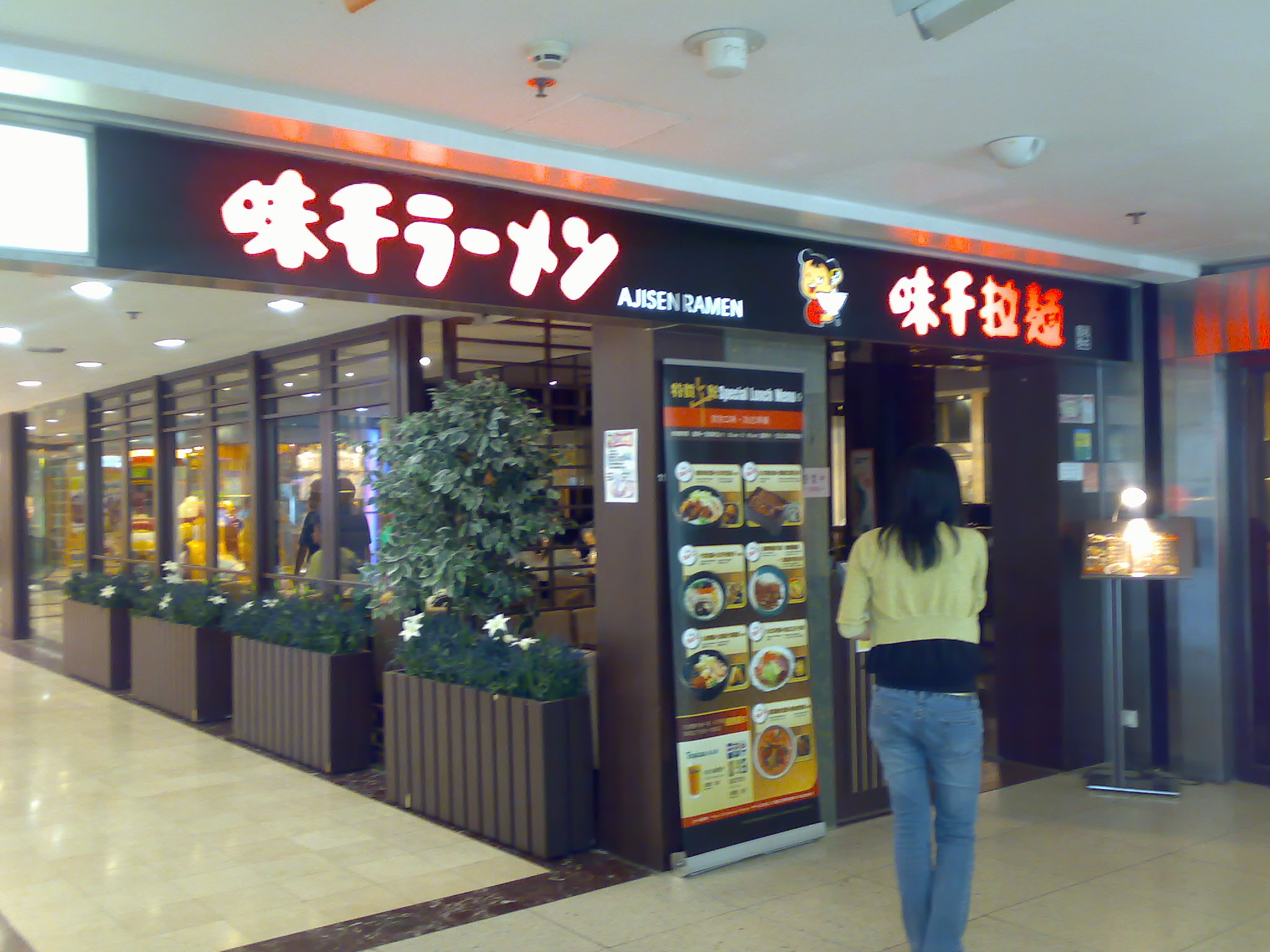
An Ajisen Ramen restaurant in Dragon Centre, Sham Shui Po, Hong Kong

Since its inception, Ajisen Ramen has made significant headway into the Chinese market, especially in the metropolis of Shanghai, where it has 132 locations. There are a total of 590 Ajisen restaurants in the China region as of August 2011. Those expansion of stores were started by present CEO of Ajisen Ramen (China) Ltd. (SEHK: 538), Poon Wai (潘慰) from Hong Kong in 1996.

The current president of the Hong Kong-listed Ajisen China Holdings is businesswoman Poon Wai. The company's executive directors were Poon Wai, her brother Jason Poon Ka Man (潘嘉聞), and Yin Yi Bing (尹一兵). Yan resigned on 18 July 2013.

In 2011 the Chinese company was fined 200,000 yuan for misrepresenting the nutritional content of its soup.

=== Canada ===
There are ten locations in the Greater Toronto Area:

- Ajisen Ramen - two in Markham, Ontario
- Ajisen Ramen - five in Toronto (Downtown, Chinatown, Yonge/Eglinton, North York, Scarborough)
- Ajisen Ramen - Vaughan, Ontario
- Ajisen Ramen - Newmarket, Ontario
- Ajisen Ramen - Ajax, Ontario

Two in Windsor, Ontario
One in Waterloo, Ontario

=== United States ===
There are a number of locations in Los Angeles, New York City, San Francisco, and the first Ajisen Ramen restaurant opened in San Diego in November 2016. Corporate manufacturing and distribution headquarters for U.S. operations supplies U.S. stores as well as Guam is located at S. El Monte, Los Angeles, CA.

=== Panama ===
Panama City

- Ajisen Ramen Via Brasil
- Ajisen Ramen El Dorado
- Ajisen Ramen Costa del Este

=== Europe ===
Ajisen Ramen opened a new outlet at Helsinki Airport in Finland in 2019. This is the first location in the Nordic countries and the second in Europe. The restaurant opened in the newest part of the ongoing terminal expansion at the airport in early 2019. Ajisen Ramen also has an outlet in Rome Fiumicino Airport.

=== Singapore ===
There are currently 14 outlets in Singapore, a few being located at:

- AMK Hub
- Bedok Mall
- Compass One
- Waterway Point
- Vivocity

=== Philippines ===
- Robinsons Place Manila
- Sto Domingo, Quezon City
- V.A. Rufino St, Legaspi Village, Makati
- Ortigas Center, Pasig
- Robinsons Place Las Piñas
- Double Dragon Meridian Plaza
- Robinsons Magnolia
- Robinsons Galleria
- Ayala Malls Manila Bay

=== New Zealand ===
- Newmarket, Auckland
- Henderson, Auckland
- Takapuna, Auckland

== Hiring controversy ==
The company announced the appointment of Joseph Lau Si-sing (劉士盛) as chief operating officer on 18 July 2013. Lau left the company "by mutual consent" in late September, five days after corporate governance activist David Webb criticised his appointment. Webb pointed out that the company had failed to disclose that Lau, former managing director of McDonald's (Hong Kong), was convicted in April 2009 of bribery and attempting to pervert the course of justice. Later, Webb blogged that Lau did not graduate from Caltech as was claimed in the company's appointment announcement. Lau's prison term expired just three days before Ajisen first announced his appointment. The company said the errors were "mainly caused by insufficient communication between Lau and the staff of our human resources department and translation error".

== See also ==
- Aji Ichiban
- List of noodle restaurants
- Ramen shop
