= Ramen Street =

Place in Tokyo, Japan

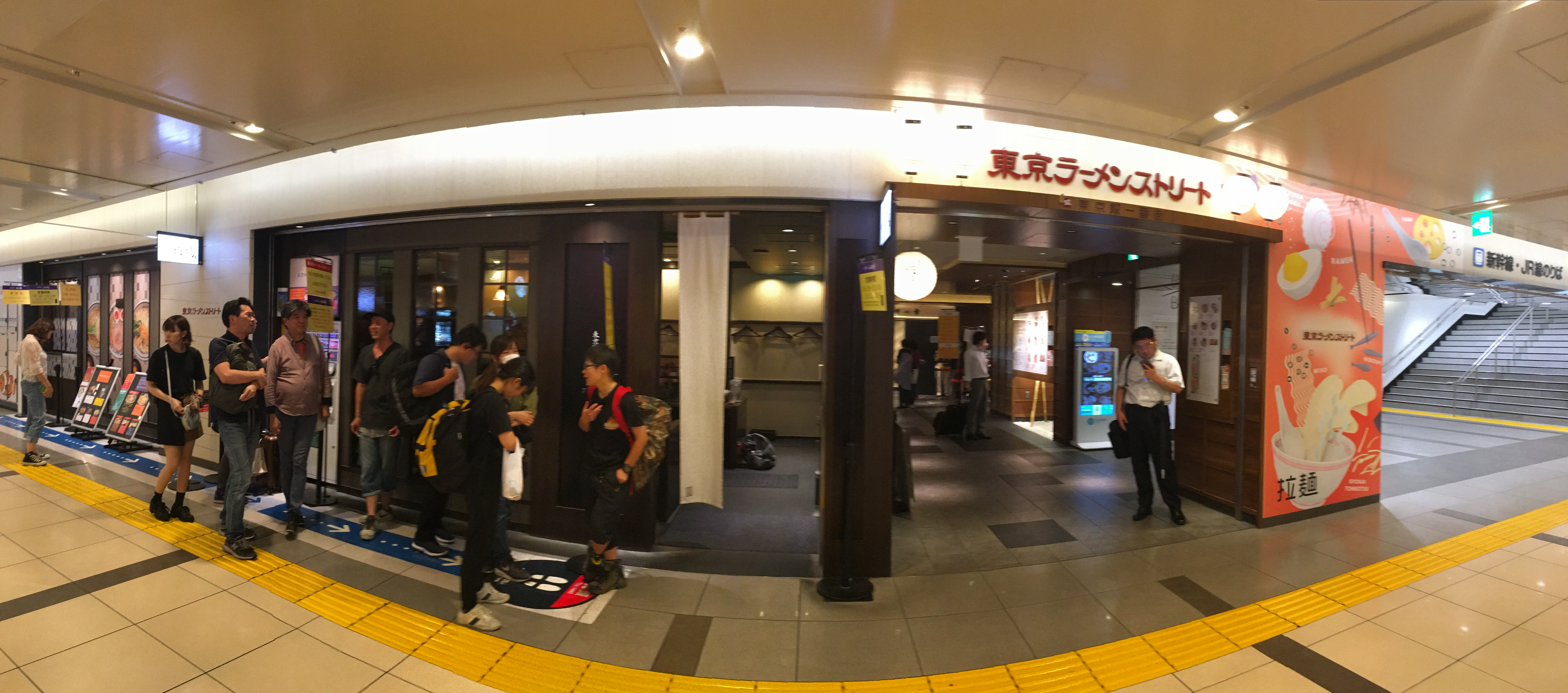
Customers lined up to get tickets for the ramen shops, 2019

Ramen Street is an area in the underground mall of the Tokyo Station railway station's Yaesu side that has eight restaurants specializing in ramen dishes. Some of the restaurants at Ramen Street include Rokurinsha, which specializes in tsukemen, Kanisenmon Keisuke, specializing in crab ramen dishes, and Nidaime Keisuke Ebi Soba Gaiden, specializing in prawn ramen dishes.

An unrelated, unofficially-named "Ramen Street" also exists on the top floor of Kyōto Station in Kyōto.

== Overview ==
Tokyo Station is located in the Marunouchi business district of Tokyo, Japan, and Ramen Street is located on the basement floor of the underground mall. Tokyo station also has an area called "Kitchen Street" that purveys foods.

=== Restaurants ===
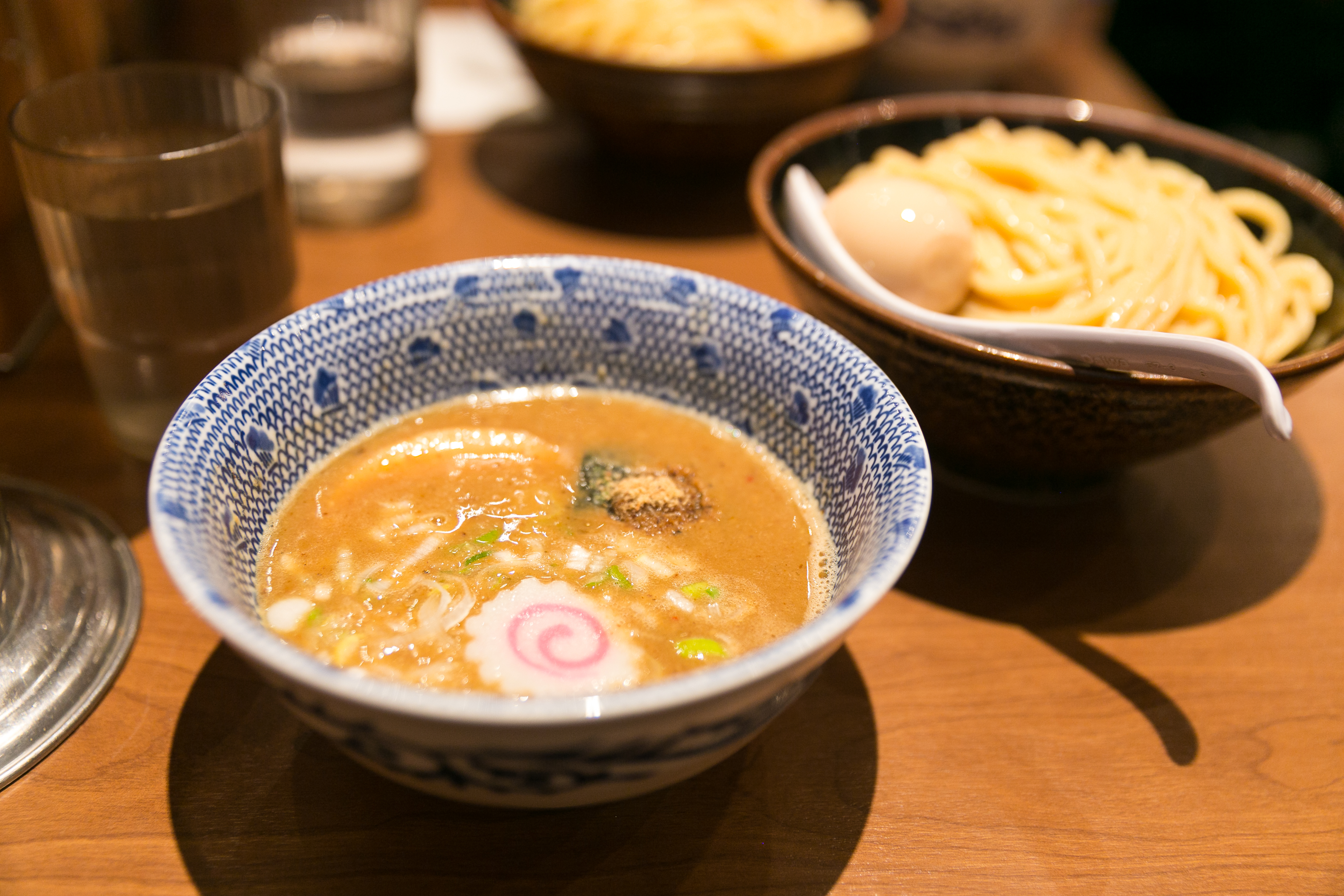
Tsukemen at a Rokurinsha restaurant in Tokyo

As of January 2017, eight ramen restaurants are located at Ramen Street, and in 2011 it had four restaurants. All restaurants use a ticketing system, where consumers purchase a ticket from a central vending machine to select their order, after which the ticket is given to wait staff to order food. In 2013, prices varied between approximately 850–1000 yen. The restaurants at Ramen Street serve a great deal of commuters, along with general travelers and train company personnel.

Rokurinsha restaurant is one of the most popular restaurants at Ramen Street, and sometimes has long lines of people waiting to be served that overflows outside of the restaurant, with waiting times that can sometimes range from 40–60 minutes. Rokurinsha is well-known for specializing in tsukemen, a dish in Japanese cuisine consisting of separate servings of noodles and soup or broth, whereby the noodles are dipped in the soup.

Other restaurants at Ramen Street include Kanisenmon Keisuke, which specializes in crab-based ramen dishes (カニ専門 kani senmon "specializing in crab"), Nidaime Keisuke Ebi Soba Gaiden, which opened in 2009 and specializes in prawn-based ramen dishes, and Kagari.

== See also ==
- Food court
- Food hall
- List of noodle restaurants
- Ramen shop
- Shin-Yokohama Rāmen Museum
