= Mak's Noodle =

Cantonese restaurant in Central, Hong Kong

Coordinates: 22.2831°N 114.1545°E

Mak's Noodle (麥奀雲吞麵世家)
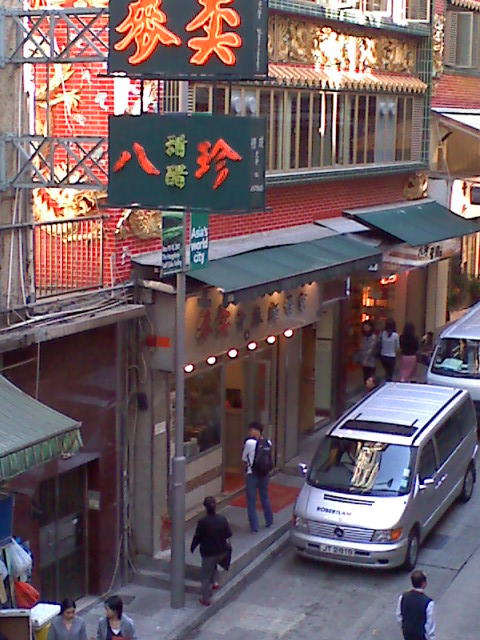
- View of the shop from footbridge
- Interactive map of Mak's Noodle (麥奀雲吞麵世家)

Restaurant information
- Owner: Mak Chi-ming
- Food type: Cantonese: wonton noodles
- Location: Wellington Street, Central, Central, Victoria City, Hong Kong

Mak's Noodle (Chinese: 麥奀雲吞麵世家) is a traditional Cantonese restaurant in Central, Hong Kong, specialising in wonton noodles.

== History ==
Dating back to the 1960s, the business is now in the run by Mak Chi-ming, a third-generation descendant of Mak Woon-chi (麥煥池) who once served the dish to the President of the Republic of China Chiang Kai-shek. It is claimed that the recipe has remained unchanged since Mak's grandfather's time.

The restaurant has its roots in a Guangzhou eaterie established before World War II by Mak Woon-chi. One of his sons, Mak King-hung (麥鏡鴻), nicknamed Mak Ngan (麥奀) because he was extremely skinny as a child, started an open air food stall in Central in 1968 where his younger brother was the chef. The founder retired in 1983, and renounced his food stall license in lieu of HK$36,000 in compensation from the Hong Kong government.

The founder's eldest son, Mak Chi-chung (麥志忠), opened his own restaurant Chung Kee Noodles (忠記麵家), in 1986, while Mak senior partnered his son-in-law in 1989 to reincarnate his original business in Wellington Street. He ran the restaurant himself and retired again in 1996. The business was succeeded by his second son Mak Chi-ming, the current proprietor.

In recent years, Mak's Noodle has established outlets at Olympian City, China Hong Kong City, Causeway Bay and Jordan, and one restaurant in Macau. Their first Singapore outlet opened on Orchard Road in the Centrepoint shopping mall, with by a second outlet at Westgate Shopping Mall in Jurong East.

On 21 December 2020, Mak's Noodle announced it will be shutting its flagship – and last remaining – outlet in Singapore at The Centrepoint mall on 28 Feb 2021.

== Gallery ==
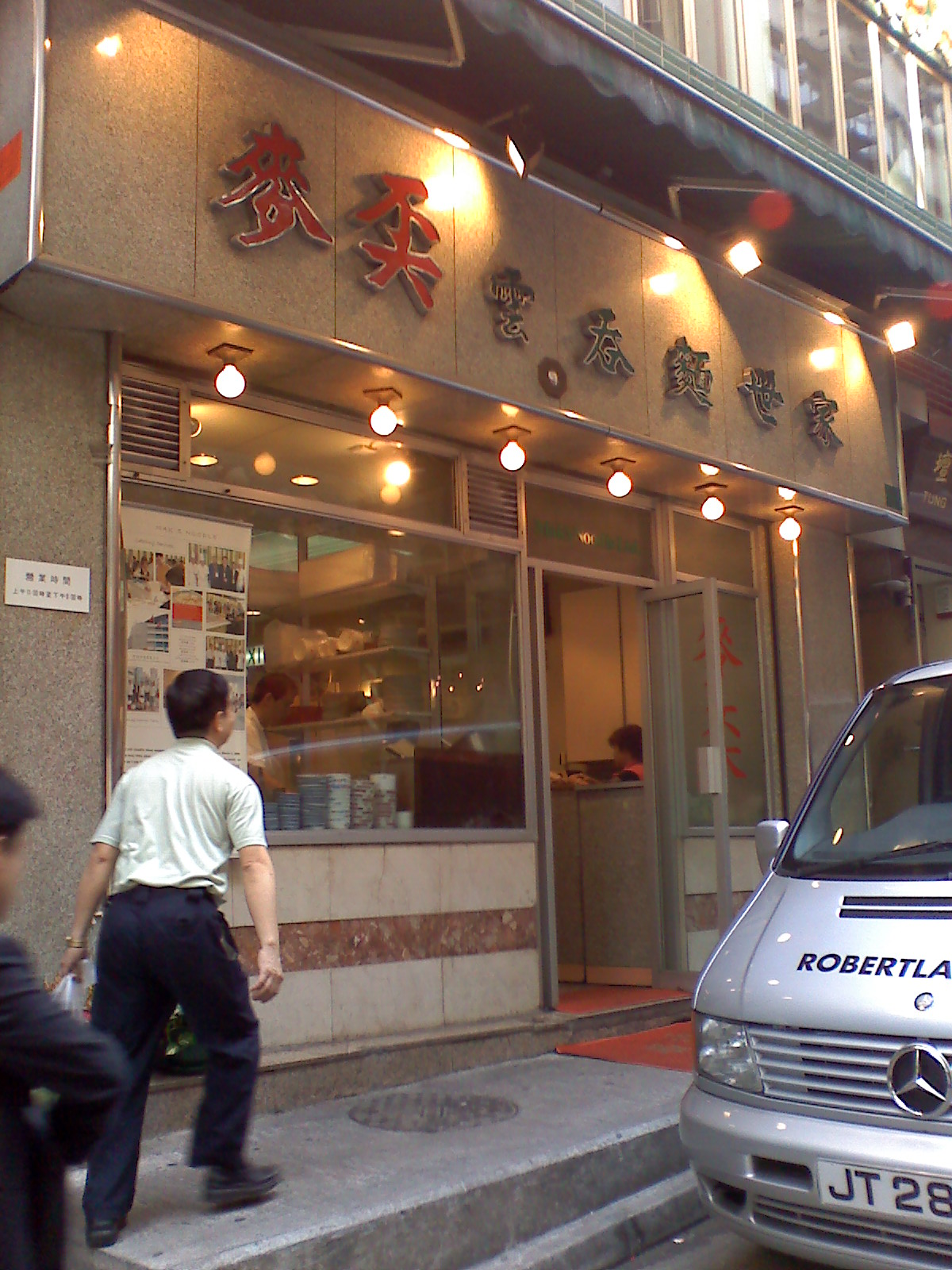
Front entrance

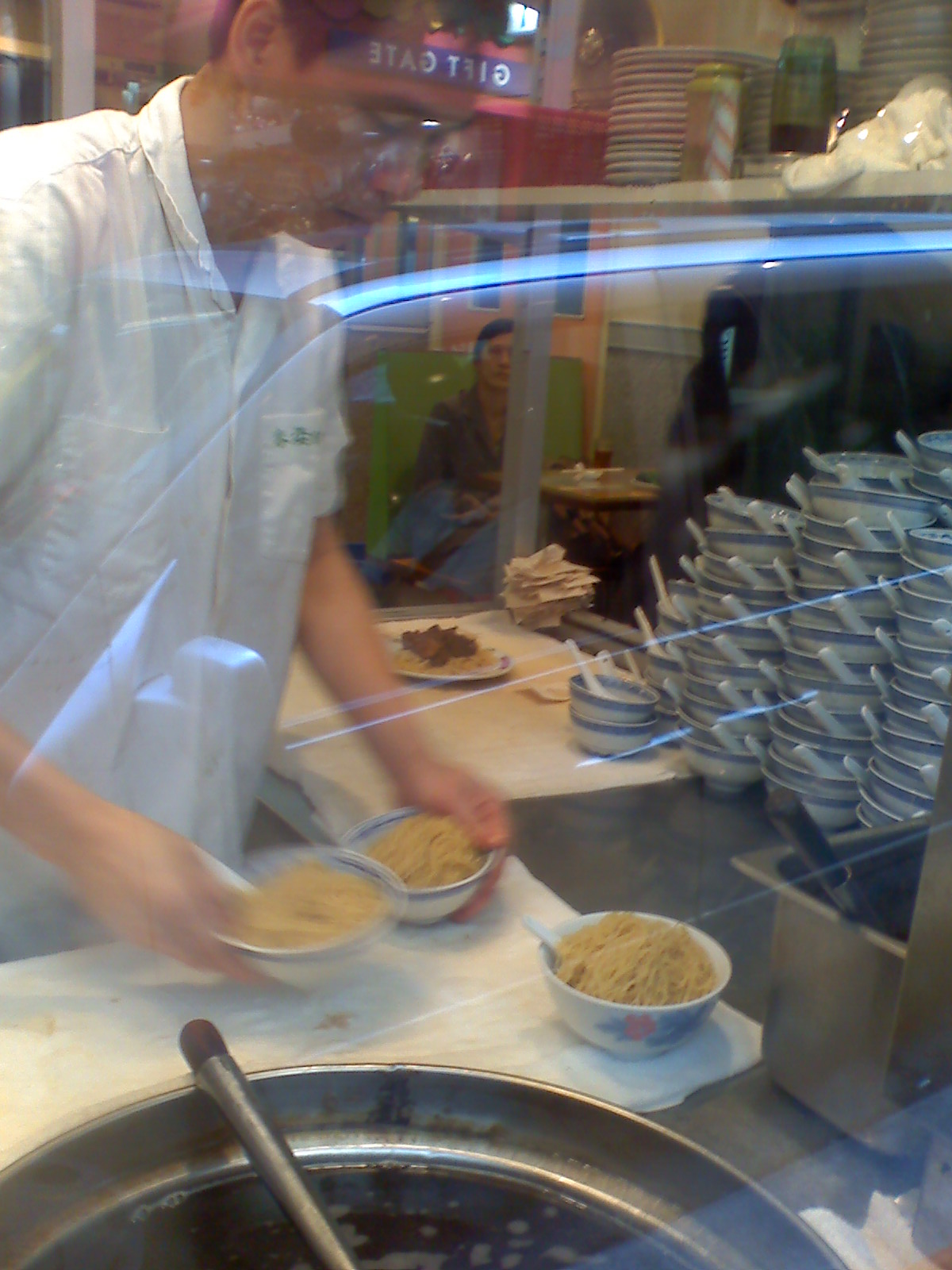
The chef at work

== See also ==
- List of noodle restaurants
