= Ooink =

Ramen shop in Seattle, Washington, U.S.

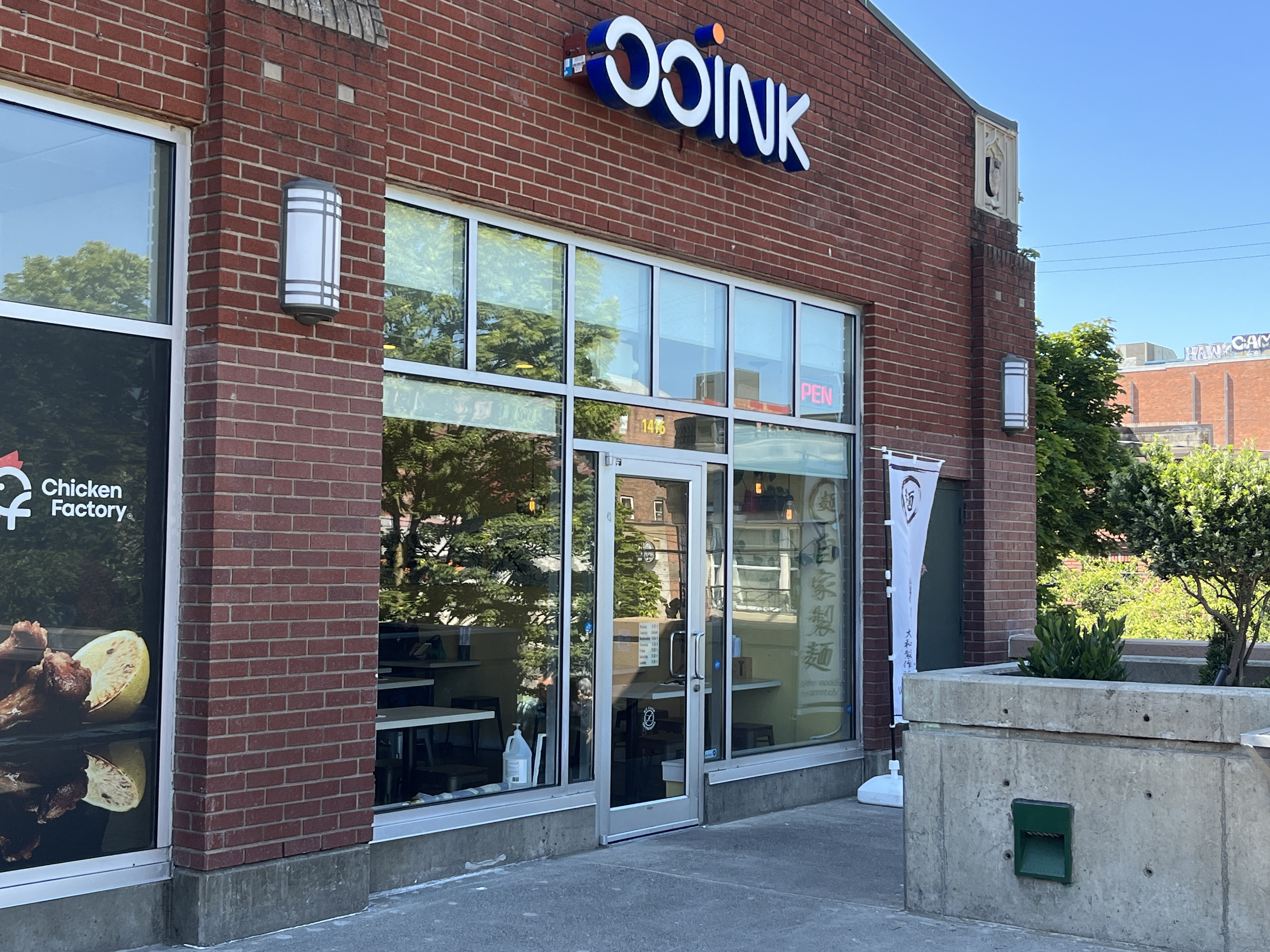
- The restaurant's exterior, 2023
- Interactive map of Ooink

Restaurant information
- Food type: Japanese
- Location: Seattle, King, Washington, United States
- Coordinates: 47.6139°N 122.3212°W
- Website: ooinkramen.com

Ooink is a ramen shop with two locations in Seattle, in the U.S. state of Washington. The business is owned by chef Chong Boon Ooi and his wife Jiaxin Wang. The restaurant's logo depicts a pig.

The original restaurant operates above a QFC store at the intersection of Broadway and East Pike Street, where Capitol Hill meets First Hill. A second location opened in the Fremont neighborhood in 2022.

== Reception ==
In 2018, Aimee Rizzo of The Infatuation wrote, "Ooink is a small ramen spot in a neighborhood packed with lots of other places to eat noodle soup. But this one stands out because the sliced pork on top is the most tender in town, and the gyoza dumplings are pretty massive. Both of those things make up for the fact that a) this place replaced Vostok (a dumpling place we loved), and b) you could probably never eat with a group in here. So, pop in alone or with one other person when a hot bowl of broth feels right – like when you have a cold, or need to steam your face." She also included Ooink in a 2022 list of the city's best dumplings.

Chelsea Lin included Ooink in Seattle Magazine's 2018 list of the city's five best new ramen restaurants. Jacob Uitti included the business in Seattle Weekly's 2018 list of "The 9 Best Soups for Surviving Winter in Seattle". Seattle Metropolitan included Ooink in a 2022 list of the city's 100 best restaurants. Ooink was included in Eater Seattle's 2025 overview of the best restaurants on Capitol Hill.

== See also ==
- List of Japanese restaurants
- List of noodle restaurants
