= Master Kong =

Taiwanese-Chinese instant noodle company

Tingyi (Cayman Islands) Holding Corporation
- Trade name: Tingyi (Cayman Islands) Holding Corporation 頂益（開曼島）控股有限公司; Dǐngyì（Kāimàn dǎo）Kònggǔ Yǒuxiàngōngsī
- Native name: 康師傅控股有限公司
- Company type: Public company
- Traded as: SEHK: 322; TWSE: 910322
- Industry: Foods
- Founded: 1991
- Headquarters: Taipei, Taiwan; Tianjin, China
- Area served: China
- Key people: CEO Wei Junxian
- Products: Instant noodles, beverages, baked goods, soft drinks, bottled water
- Parent: Ting Hsin International Group (33.48%); Sanyo Foods Co., Ltd (33.48%)
- Website: www.masterkong.com.cn

Master Kong (traditional Chinese: 康師傅控股有限公司; simplified Chinese: 康师傅控股有限公司; pinyin: Kāng-shīfu Kònggǔ Yǒuxiàngōngsī) is an instant noodle producer in China.

Established in 1991, Master Kong is a branded company headquartered in Taipei, Taiwan and Tianjin, China. It produces instant noodles, beverages, and cakes.

Master Kong reported a revenue and net profit of 62 and 3.3 billion yuan, respectively, accounting for 43.3% of instant noodle market.

Since November 2011, Master Kong produces producing non-alcoholic beverages for PepsiCo. The company also produce bottled and canned coffee drinks for Starbucks since March 2015.

In June 2018, Master Kong was shortlisted in the national brand project of Xinhua News Agency.

== History ==
The company was founded in Tianjin by the Wei brothers from Changhua County, Taiwan in 1991. It was listed on the Hong Kong Stock Exchange in 1996.

It is owned 33.48% by Ting Hsin International Group and 33.48% by Sanyo Foods.

In March 2011, Unilever was fined 2 million Yuan for the distribution of information about future price hikes and Tingyi was given a warning about publicly discussing their price increases.

In June 2011, Master Kong was recognized by market research firm, TNS, to be the second most valued brand in China.

As of 2013, its main competitors are Want Want China and Uni-President.

In 2014, Master Kong was facing a food safety problem in Taiwan. In 2015, Master Kong stopped distributing its instant noodles in Taiwan. The group's board of directors has approved a plan to completely withdraw from the Taiwanese market.

== See also ==
- Master Kong Chef's Table
