= Shin-Yokohama Ramen Museum =

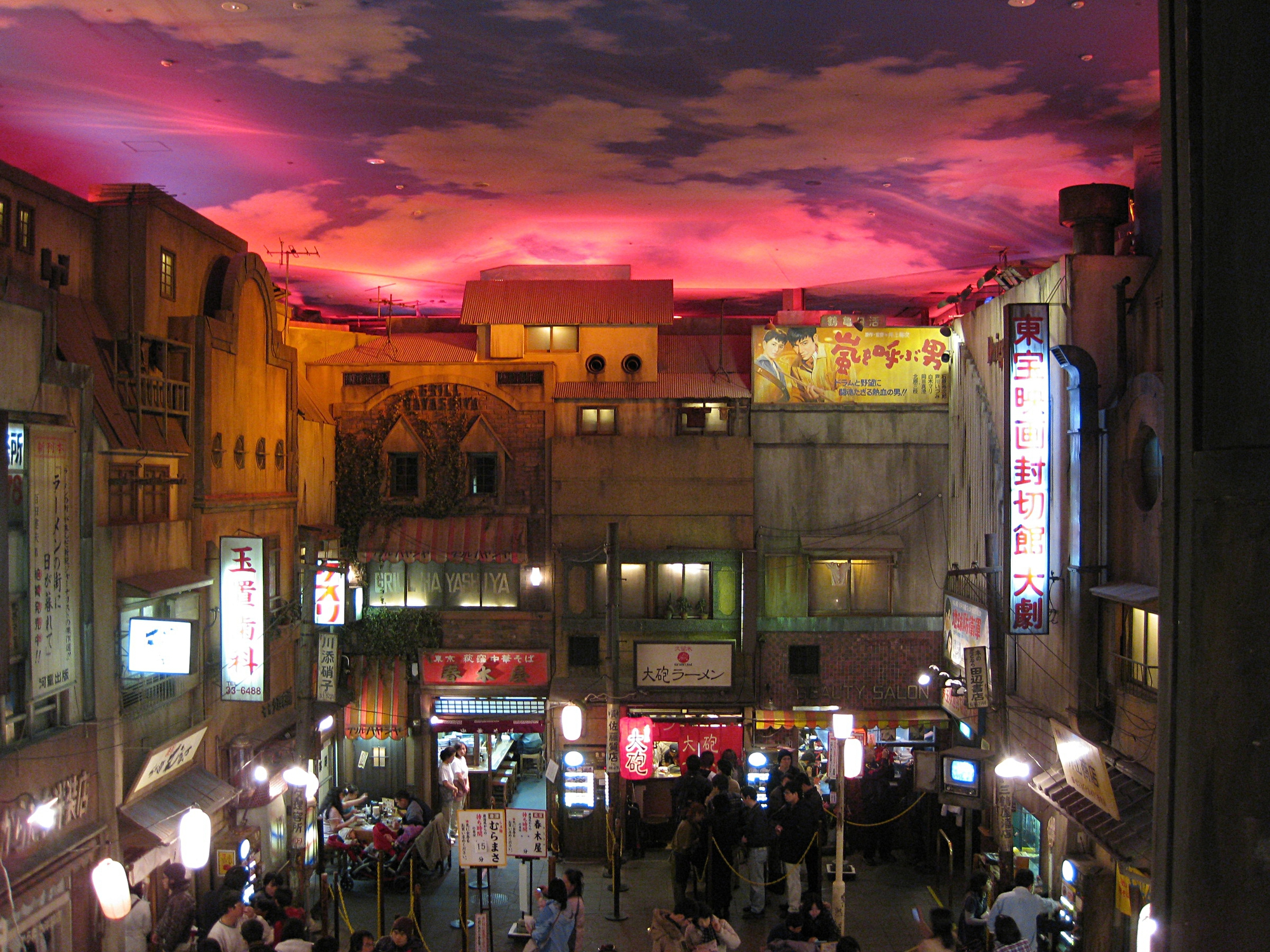
- Ramen stands on the lower level of the museum

- Location within Japan

Restaurant information
- Established: 1994
- Food type: Ramen noodle soup
- Location: Kōhoku-ku, Yokohama, Japan
- Coordinates: 35°30′36″N 139°36′52″E
- Website: Official website (in Japanese)

The Shin-Yokohama Ramen Museum (新横浜ラーメン博物館, Shin-Yokohama Rāmen Hakubutsukan) contains ground-floor exhibits on the history of ramen, and a ramen-themed food court on its basement levels. The museum opened in 1994, and is located in the Shin-Yokohama district of Kōhoku-ku, Yokohama, Japan.

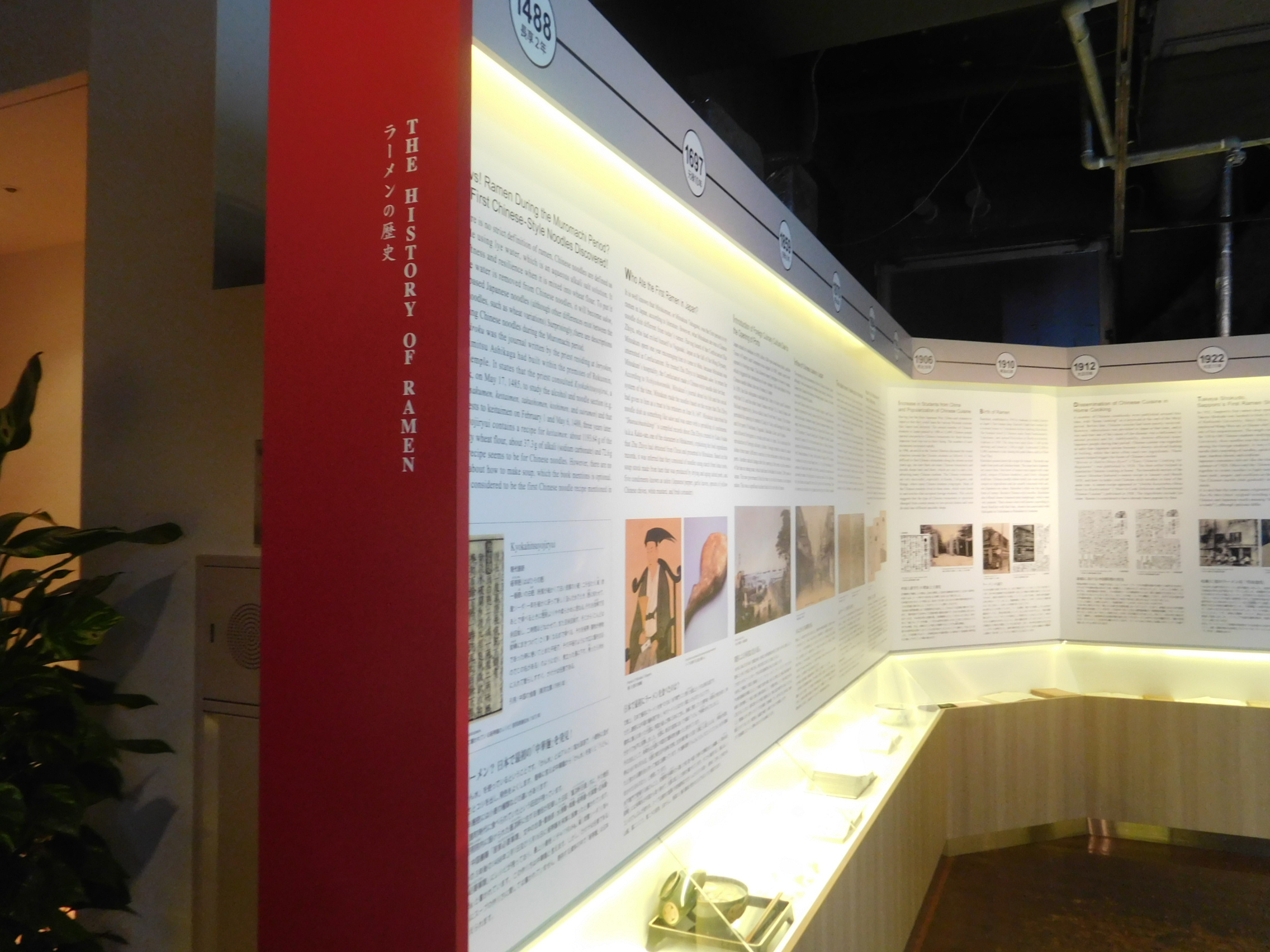
Ground-floor historical display panels

The museum's ground level provides a detailed history of ramen, contains exhibits of vintage ramen paraphernalia, displays the variety of noodles, soups, toppings and bowls used across Japan, and shows how the noodles are made.

The lower-level food court is devoted to the Japanese ramen noodle soup and features a small recreation of Tokyo as it appeared in 1958, the year instant noodles were invented. Within the food court are branches of famous ramen restaurants from Kyushu to Hokkaido. The list includes Ide Shoten, Shinasobaya, Keyaki, Ryushanhai, Hachiya, Fukuchan, and Komurasaki. In 2013, the food court added American restaurant Ikemen Hollywood to their restaurants, and have since decided to close the branch in June 2014.

== Gallery ==
Ramen from the Shin-Yokohama Ramen Museum
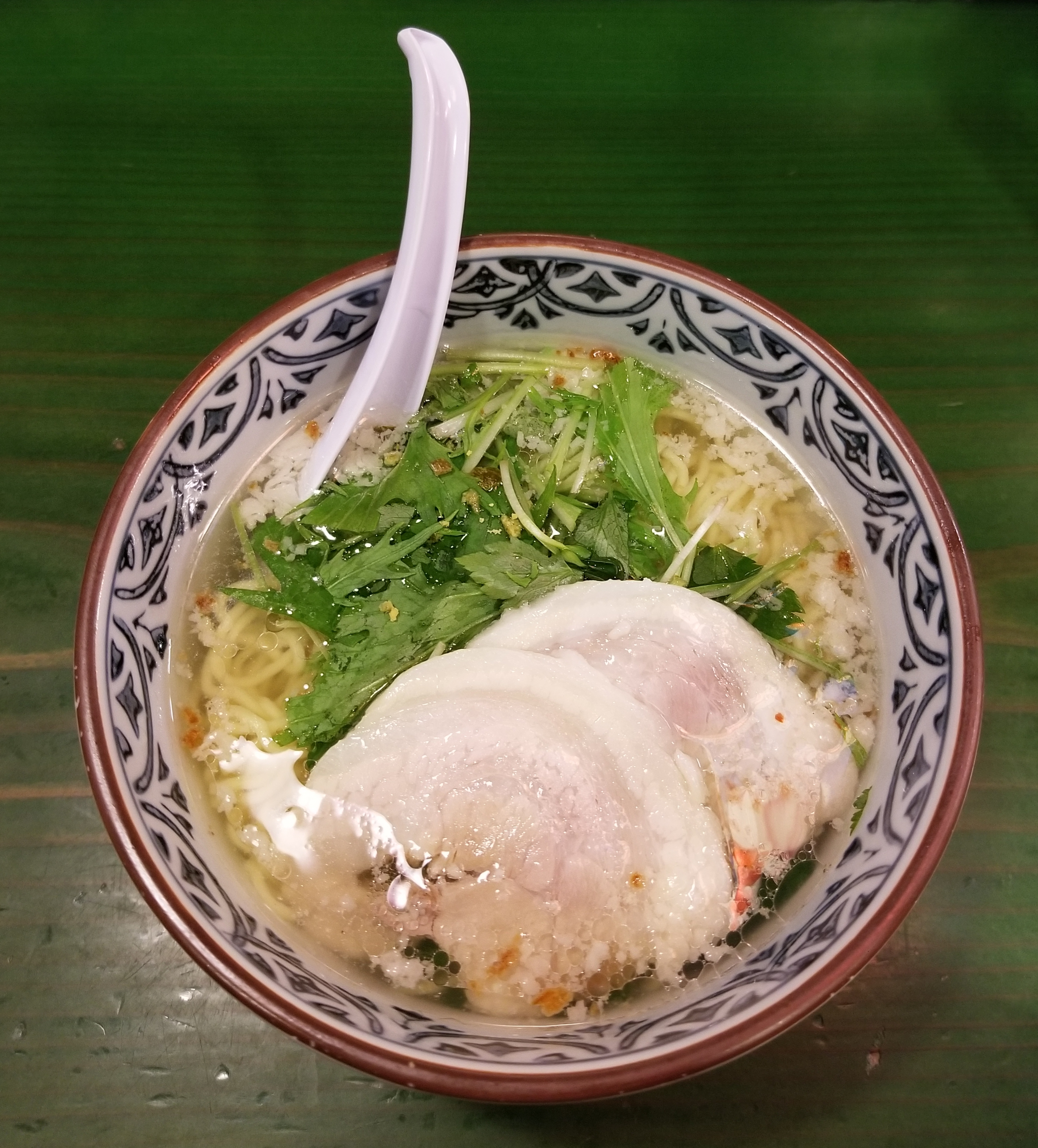
Shio ramen from Ryukyu Ramen Tondou

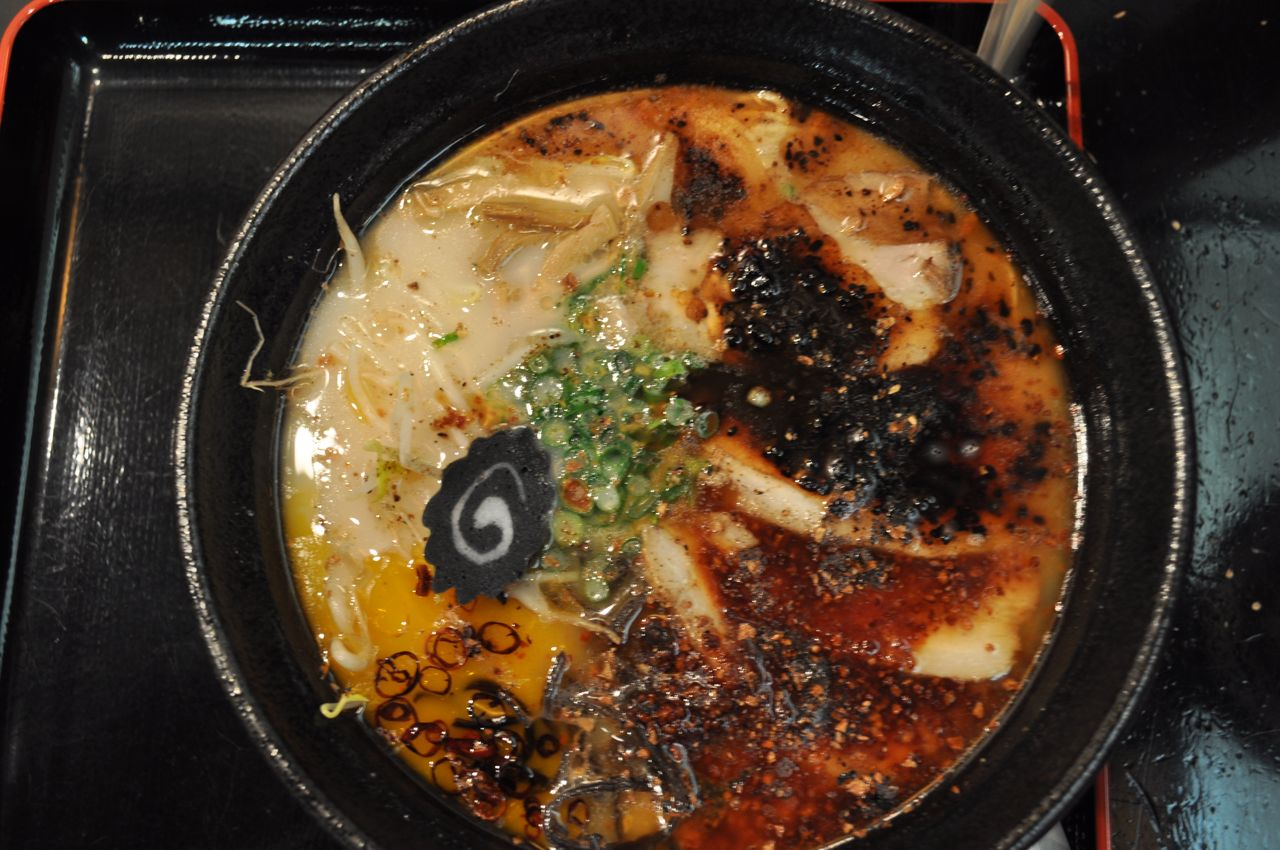
Tonkotsu ramen with black garlic and chilli from a ramen stand at the museum

== See also ==
- CupNoodles Museum Yokohama
- List of food and beverage museums
- Ramen Street
