= Hakata Gensuke =

Ramen restaurant franchise in Australia

- Address: 113 Russell St; Melbourne; Australia
- Opened: 2014

Website
- gensuke.com.au

Hakata Gensuke is a Japanese ramen restaurant franchise headquartered in Melbourne, Australia. It is a subsidiary of the Japanese ramen brand Ikkousha and is owned by the restaurateur and chef Kousuke Yoshimura.

== Description ==
The venue is located on Russell St, in Melbourne's CBD. The ramen served is of the Fukuoka, tonkotsu variety. Three broths are served; tonkotsu, black sesame tonkotsu, and the spicy 'god fire'. Four textures of noodle are served, and black fungus and bamboo shoots serve as toppings. The master broth is prepared over a 12-hour period.

The noodles at the restaurant are made in Melbourne.

== History ==
In 2017, the chain set up a location in East Victoria Park, Western Australia. Prior to its opening, its chefs were trained in Melbourne and Japan.
