= Aji Ichiban =

Hong Kong-based snack food franchise

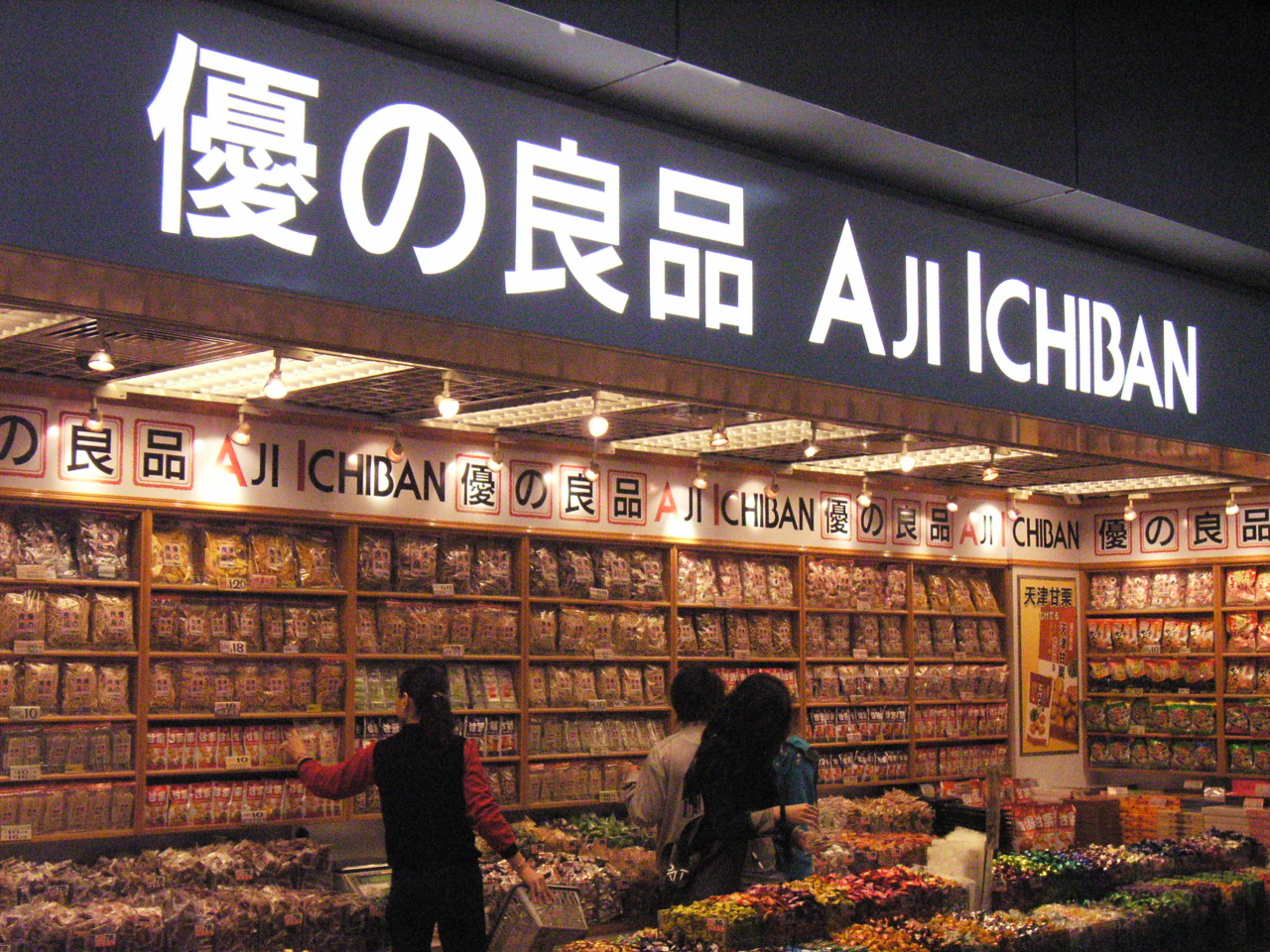
- An outlet in a Hong Kong MTR station
- Chinese: 優の良品 (優之良品)
Transcriptions
Standard Mandarin
- Hanyu Pinyin: yōu zhī liáng pǐn
Yue: Cantonese
- Yale Romanization: Yāu jī lèuhng bán
- Jyutping: Jau1 zi1 leong4 ban2

Aji Ichiban (Chinese: 優の良品) was one of the largest snack food franchises in Hong Kong, established in 1993 by Lai Chan Yuk Hing and Lai Hin Tai, who were the president and managing director, respectively. Despite having a hiragana syllabary no (の) in its name, Aji Ichiban was not a Japanese franchise. There were over 90 international locations in varying international destinations.

== Product ==
Items sold vary by location and encompass a wide range of flavors from both East Asian, Japanese and American cuisines, including beef jerky, dried apricots, Skittles, chocolates, nonpareils, spicy dried fish, plum tablets, chili olives, fried and shredded squid, shrimp crackers, hot dog and hamburger-shaped gummy candies, wasabi peas, etc. In addition to providing products based on gustatory appeal, many Aji Ichiban shops carry items that have ties to traditional Eastern remedies. The stores had small bowls of samples for most of the snack items - mainly dried fruit and seafood preparations - so that customers could taste the snacks before they bought them. The snacks were purchased by taking a bag and filling it up with food from the various stations, according to the cost. It was then weighed and you paid accordingly.

== International locations ==
=== Canada ===
In Canada, Aji Ichiban had a store in Parker Place, an Asian shopping mall in Richmond, a suburb of Metro Vancouver, British Columbia. (now closed)

=== Philippines ===
In the Philippines, Aji Ichiban had several outlet-sized stores, most of which were in shopping malls.

Makati

- Power Plant Mall - Open
- Glorietta 4 - Closed

Mandaluyong

- SM Megamall Building A - Closed
- GH Mall - Open

Manila City

- Robinsons Place Manila - Closed
- SM City Sta. Mesa - Closed

Pasay

- SM Mall of Asia - Closed

Quezon City

- Robinsons Galleria - Closed
- Robinsons Magnolia - Open

San Juan

- Greenhills Shopping Center - Closed

=== United States ===
In the United States, Aji Ichiban USA was founded in 2000 as an exclusive franchise, with several stores located throughout the United States. Many Chinese political leaders paid visits to these locations. However, as of 2013, most of the locations had been closed, with Chicago's Chinatown and Los Angeles' Monterey Park being the final surviving locations as of 2023.

California

- San Jose/Cupertino - Closed
- Los Angeles
  - Monterey Park - Open
  - San Gabriel - Closed
- San Francisco
  - Chinatown - Closed

Illinois

- Chicago - Open

Hawaii

- Honolulu - Closed

Maryland

- Rockville - Closed

Massachusetts

- Boston - Closed

New York

- New York City
  - Broadway - Closed
  - Centre Street - Closed
  - Lafayette Street - Closed
  - Mott Street - Closed
  - Hester Street - Closed
  - Main Street - Closed

Pennsylvania

- Philadelphia - Closed

Texas

- Richardson - Closed

== See also ==
- List of food companies
