= Master Kong Chef's Table =

Chinese fast food restaurant chain

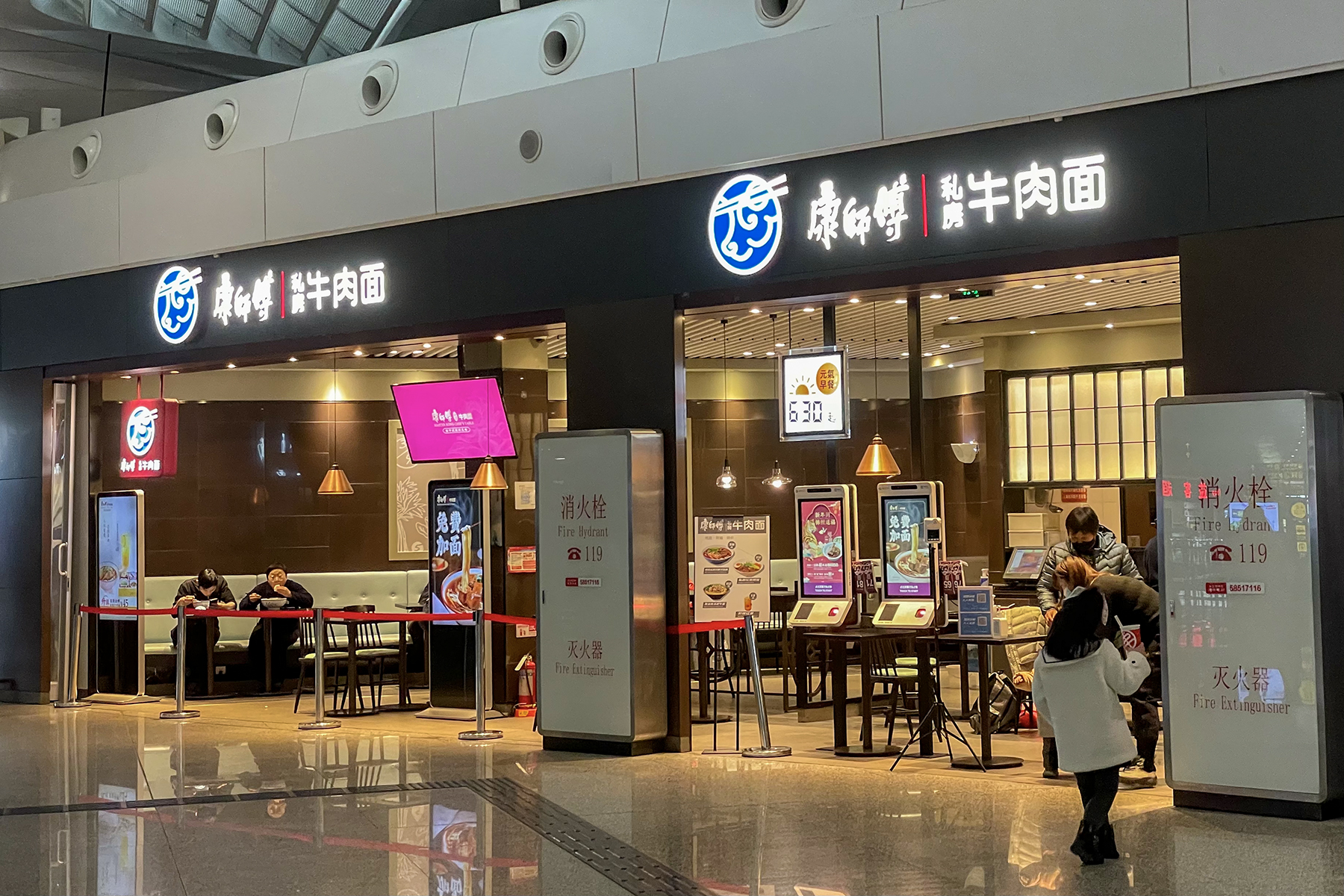
A Master Kong Chef's Table restaurant at Zhengzhou Xinzheng International Airport

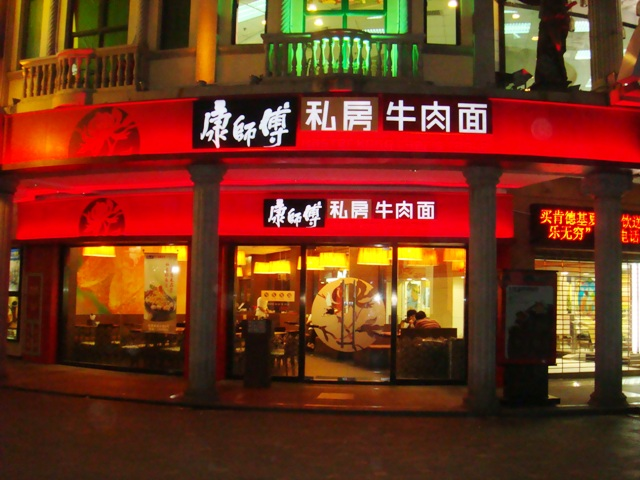
A Master Kong beef noodle restaurant at Gulangyu, Xiamen

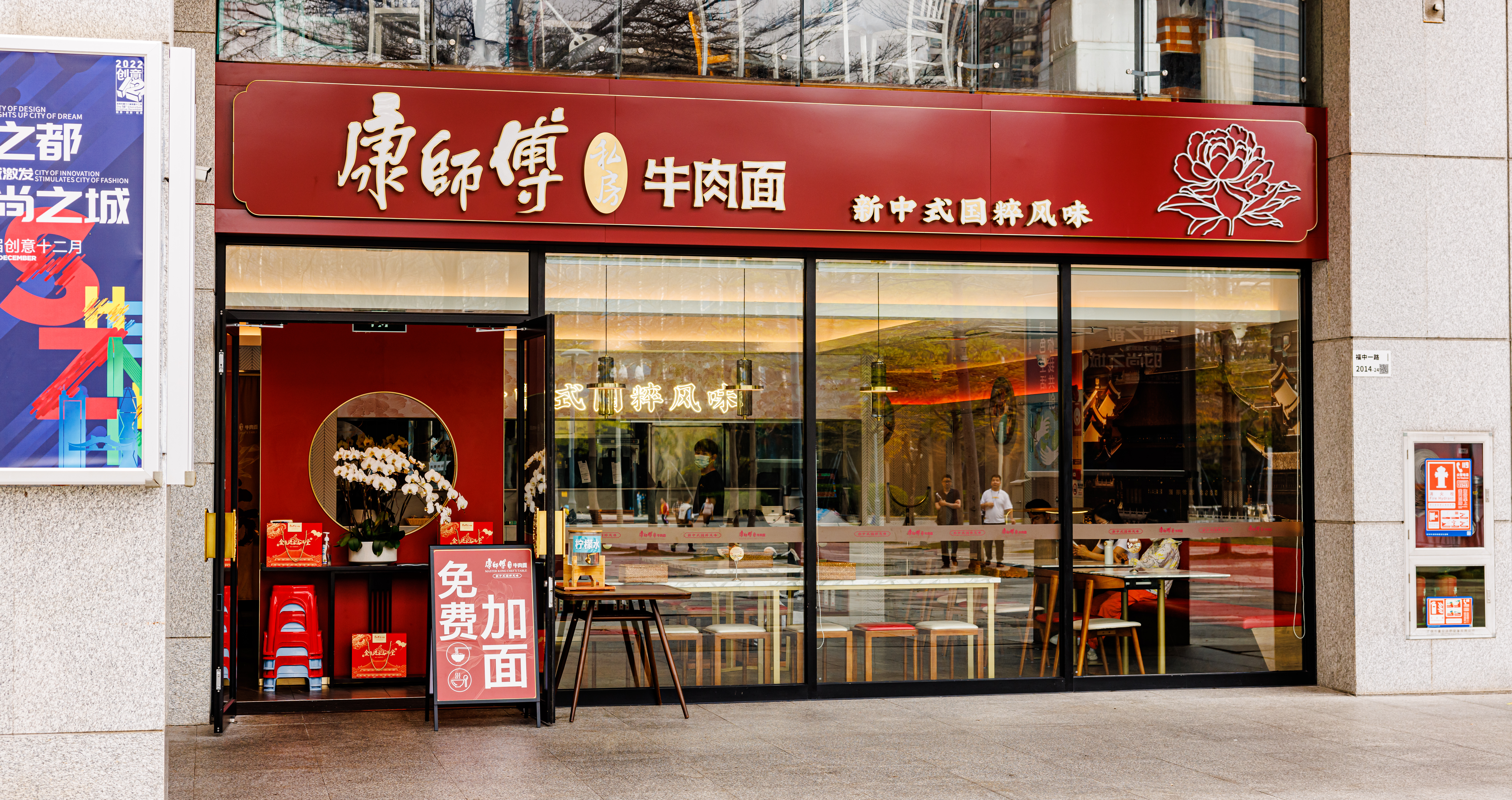
A Master Kong Chef's Table Restaurant at CBD Shenzhen Book City, Shenzhen

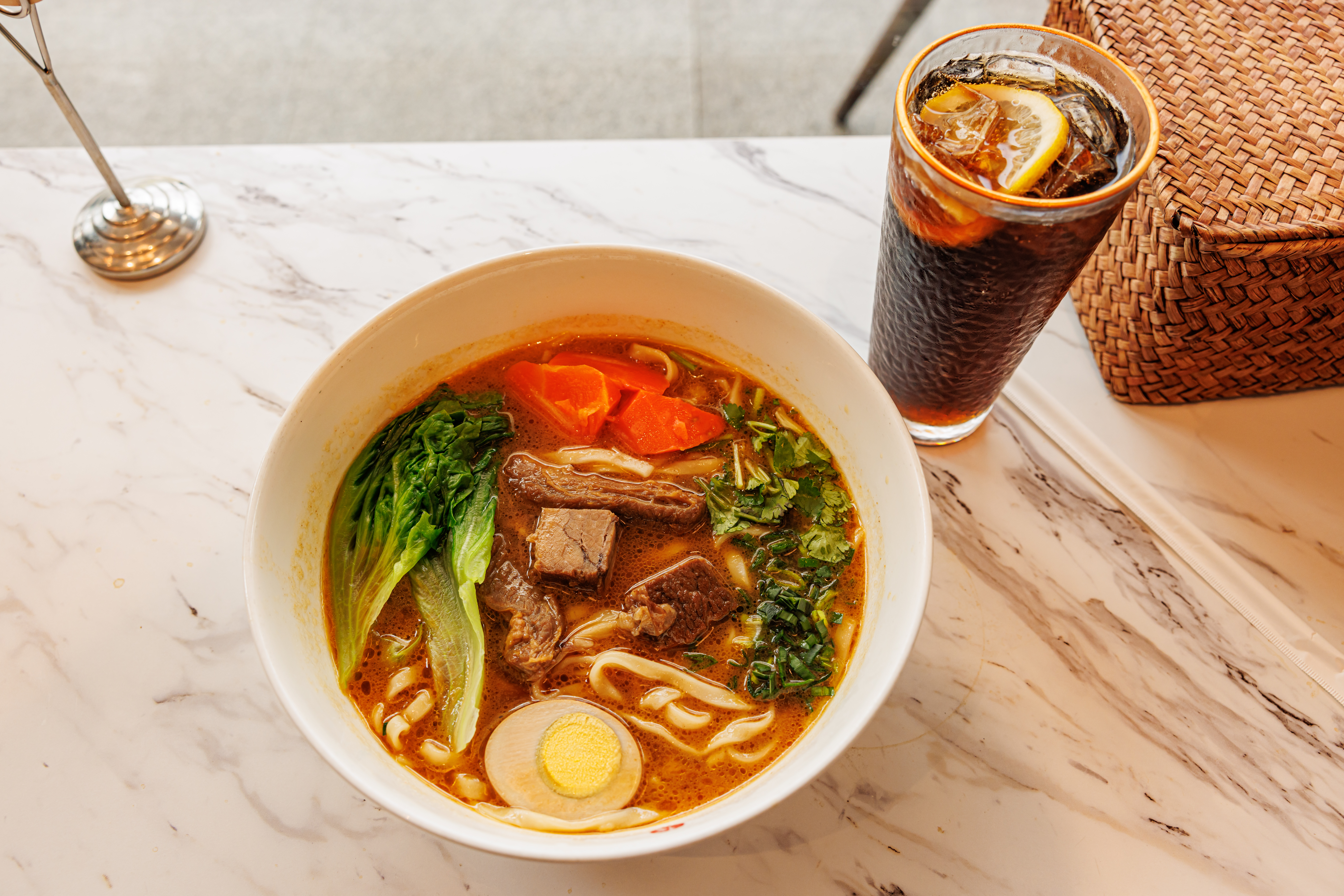
Master Kong Chef's Table Beef Noodle Soup

Master Kong Chef's Table (traditional Chinese: 康師傅私房牛肉面; simplified Chinese: 康师傅私房牛肉面; pinyin: Kāng shīfu sīfáng niúròumiàn "Master Kang's Own Beef Noodle Soup") is a Chinese fast food chain owned by Ting Hsin International Group. Its specialty is beef noodles.

The first store opened in Beijing in 2006. In 2011 there were 124 Master Kong Chef's Table restaurants in 32 Chinese cities.

As of 2007 most noodle dishes had prices of 16-24 yuan. As of 2011 the average prices of noodle bowls were 30-33 renminbi. As of 2007 the 98 renminbi per bowl top-level elastic noodles with tender beef rib was the most expensive dish; it used imported beef.

As of 2010, the chain directly competes with Yum! Brands China outlets.

== See also ==
- Tingyi (Cayman Islands) Holding Corporation
