= World Cup of Crisps =

Twitter survey of crisp flavours

Tournament information
- Location: United Kingdom
- Established: 2012; 14 years ago
- Participants: 32 (2012); 48 (2016–)
- Website: @RichardOsman on Twitter

Tournament statistics
- Top scorer(s): Frazzles; Monster Munch Pickled Onion (1 title each)

Current champion
- Monster Munch Pickled Onion (1st title)

Most recent tournament
- 2016 World Cup of Crisps

The World Cup of Crisps is a Twitter survey created and organised by British television host Richard Osman, to determine the United Kingdom's favourite brand and flavour of crisps. The competition takes place every four years, with the inaugural competition running during February and March 2012.

== History ==
The World Cup of Crisps was originally conceived on social media by Osman in January 2012. The inaugural edition had 32 types of crisp, with eight group winners qualifying for the quarter-finals, and the competition progressing further using a knockout system. Votes were cast on Twitter using the hashtag #wcocr. The second edition was expanded to include 48 types of crisp and three group stages before semi-finals and a final, and votes were cast using Twitter's new poll feature.

== Results ==
=== 2012 World Cup of Crisps ===
Due to the lack of Twitter polls, no official numbers of votes were revealed in the first edition of the World Cup of Crisps.

==== Group stages ====
Entries in bold denote crisps that qualified for the knockout stages.

Group A	Group B	Group C	Group D
Walkers Roast Chicken	Golden Wonder Salt & Vinegar	Walkers Ready Salted	Brannigans Beef & Mustard
**Discos** **Salt & Vinegar**	Doritos Cool Original	Nik Naks Spicy	French Fries Worcester Sauce
Scampi Fries	**Monster Munch Pickled Onion**	Chipsticks Salt & Vinegar	**Skips**
Seabrooks Sea Salt	Space Raiders Beef	**McCoy's Steak**	Frisps Salt & Vinegar

Group E	Group F	Group G	Group H
Walkers Smoky Bacon	Tayto Cheese & Onion	Walkers Salt & Vinegar	Walkers Prawn Cocktail
Hula Hoops Salt & Vinegar	Wheat Crunchies Spicy Tomato	**Quavers**	Hula Hoops Ready Salted
**Wotsits**	**Frazzles**	Tomato Snaps	**Monster Munch Beef**
Doritos Chilli Heatwave	McCoys Salt & Vinegar	Pringles BBQ	Pringles Salt & Vinegar

==== Knockout stage ====
Quarter-Finals
McCoy's Steak	L
**Wotsits**	**W**
**Quavers**	**W**
Discos Salt & Vinegar	L
**Skips**	**W**
Monster Munch Beef	L
Monster Munch Pickled Onion	L
**Frazzles**	**W**

Semi-Finals
**Wotsits**	**W**
Quavers	L
Skips	L
**Frazzles**	**W**

Final
Wotsits	L
**Frazzles**	**W**

=== 2016 World Cup of Crisps ===
The second edition began on Saturday 26 March and was set to conclude on Monday 28 March. The new Twitter poll feature automatically tallied the results, and during the semi-finals over one million votes had been cast.

==== First Group Stage ====
The 48 crisps were drawn into twelve groups of four, with the top two from each group progressing to the second group stage. Bold indicates crisps that qualified.

**Group 1**

Crisp	% Received
**Walkers Salt & Vinegar**	**28**
**Hula Hoops Ready Salted**	**28**
Doritos Tangy Cheese	26
Scampi Fries	18

**Group 2**

Crisp	% Received
**Monster Munch Pickled Onion**	**38**
**Pringles Sour Cream & Chive**	**37**
Burton's Fish & Chips	13
Golden Wonder Cheese & Onion	12

**Group 3**

Crisp	% Received
**Wotsits**	**34**
**Pom-Bear**	**23**
Tyrells Salt & Vinegar	22
Walkers Roast Chicken	21

**Group 4**

Crisp	% Received
**Chipsticks**	**27**
**Walkers Smoky Bacon**	**26**
Taytos Cheese & Onion	26
Space Raiders Pickled Onion	21

Due to the tie between Walkers Smoky Bacon and Taytos Cheese & Onion, a 10-minute tiebreak poll was conducted, with Walkers defeating Taytos by 51% to 49%.

**Group 5**

Crisp	% Received
**Skips**	**40**
**McCoy's Steak**	**38**
Seabrooks Sea Salt	15
Golden Wonder Salt & Vinegar	7

**Group 6**

Crisp	% Received
**Walkers Sensations Sweet Chilli**	**30**
**Walkers Cheese & Onion**	**28**
Pringles BBQ	21
Smith's Square Chips Salt & Vinegar	21

**Group 7**

Crisp	% Received
**Doritos Cool Original**	**31**
**Frazzles**	**30**
French Fries Salt & Vinegar	22
Branningans Beef & Mustard	17

**Group 8**

Crisp	% Received
**Walkers Ready Salted**	**30**
**Monster Munch Roast Beef**	**29**
Kettle Chips Salt & Vinegar	29
Spicy Tomato Snaps	12

**Group 9**

Crisp	% Received
**McCoy's Salt & Vinegar**	**33**
**Monster Munch Flamin' Hot**	**31**
Kettle Chips Salt & Pepper	27
Pop Chips BBQ	9

**Group 10**

Crisp	% Received
**Doritos Chilli Heatwave**	**27**
**Wheat Crunchies Bacon**	**26**
Walkers Prawn Cocktail	25
Discos Salt & Vinegar	22

**Group 11**

Crisp	% Received
**Mini Cheddars**	**39**
**Hula Hoops Salt & Vinegar**	**32**
Roysters T-Bone	23
Mackie's Haggis	6

**Group 12**

Crisp	% Received
**Quavers**	**39**
**Nik Naks Nice & Spicy**	**30**
Pringles Salt & Vinegar	26
Golden Wonder Ready Salted	9

==== Second Group Stage ====
The 24 remaining crisps were then re-drawn into six groups of four, with the top two qualifying for a third group stage. Bold indicates crisps that qualified.

**Group 1**

Crisp	% Received
**Monster Munch Pickled Onion**	**33**
**Hula Hoops Ready Salted**	**24**
Chipsticks	22
Walkers Smoky Bacon	21

**Group 2**

Crisp	% Received
**Wotsits**	**27**
**McCoy's Steak**	**27**
Pringles Sour Cream & Chive	26
Doritos Cool Original	20

**Group 3**

Crisp	% Received
**Walkers Sweet Chilli Sensations**	**28**
**Quavers**	**27**
Walkers Salt & Vinegar	26
Wheat Crunchies Bacon	19

**Group 4**

Crisp	% Received
**Skips**	**28**
**McCoy's Salt & Vinegar**	**27**
Monster Munch Flamin' Hot	23
Pom-Bear	22

**Group 5**

Crisp	% Received
**Frazzles**	**28**
**Nik Naks Nice & Spicy**	**27**
Walkers Ready Salted	24
Hula Hoops Salt & Vinegar	21

**Group 6**

Crisp	% Received
**Doritos Chilli Heatwave**	**27**
**Walkers Cheese & Onion**	**27**
Mini Cheddars	24
Monster Munch Roast Beef	22

==== Quarter-Final Stage ====
The 12 remaining crisps were then drawn into four groups of three, with just the group winners progressing to the semi-finals. Bold indicates crisps that proceeded.

**Quarter-Final 1**

Crisp	% Received
**Monster Munch Pickled Onion**	**42**
Skips	31
McCoy's Salt & Vinegar	27

**Quarter-Final 2**

Crisp	% Received
**Quavers**	**36**
Frazzles	32
Nik Naks Nice & Spicy	32

This result saw defending champions Frazzles eliminated.

**Quarter-Final 3**

Crisp	% Received
**Walkers Cheese & Onion**	**40**
Walkers Sensations Sweet Chilli	34
Doritos Chilli Heatwave	26

**Quarter-Final 4**

Crisp	% Received
**Wotsits**	**36**
McCoy's Steak	35
Hula Hoops Ready Salted	29

==== Knockout stages ====
Semi-Finals
**Wotsits**	**50%**
Quavers	50%
**Monster Munch Pickled Onion**	**53%**
Walkers Cheese & Onion	47%

Final
Wotsits	48%
**Monster Munch Pickled Onion**	**52%**
Third-Place Play-Off
**Quavers**	**51%**
Walkers Cheese & Onion	49%

== Controversy ==
During and after the second edition of the event, several voters became disillusioned with the choice of crisps on offer. A debate began to emerge on the definition of the word crisp, with three of the four semi-finalists, Wotsits, Monster Munch and Quavers, as well as the 2012 winners Frazzles, being criticised for not conforming to some definitions of the snack. Osman invited those who doubted the validity of the winner to organise their own World Cup.
