= Squares (crisps) =

Brand of snack food

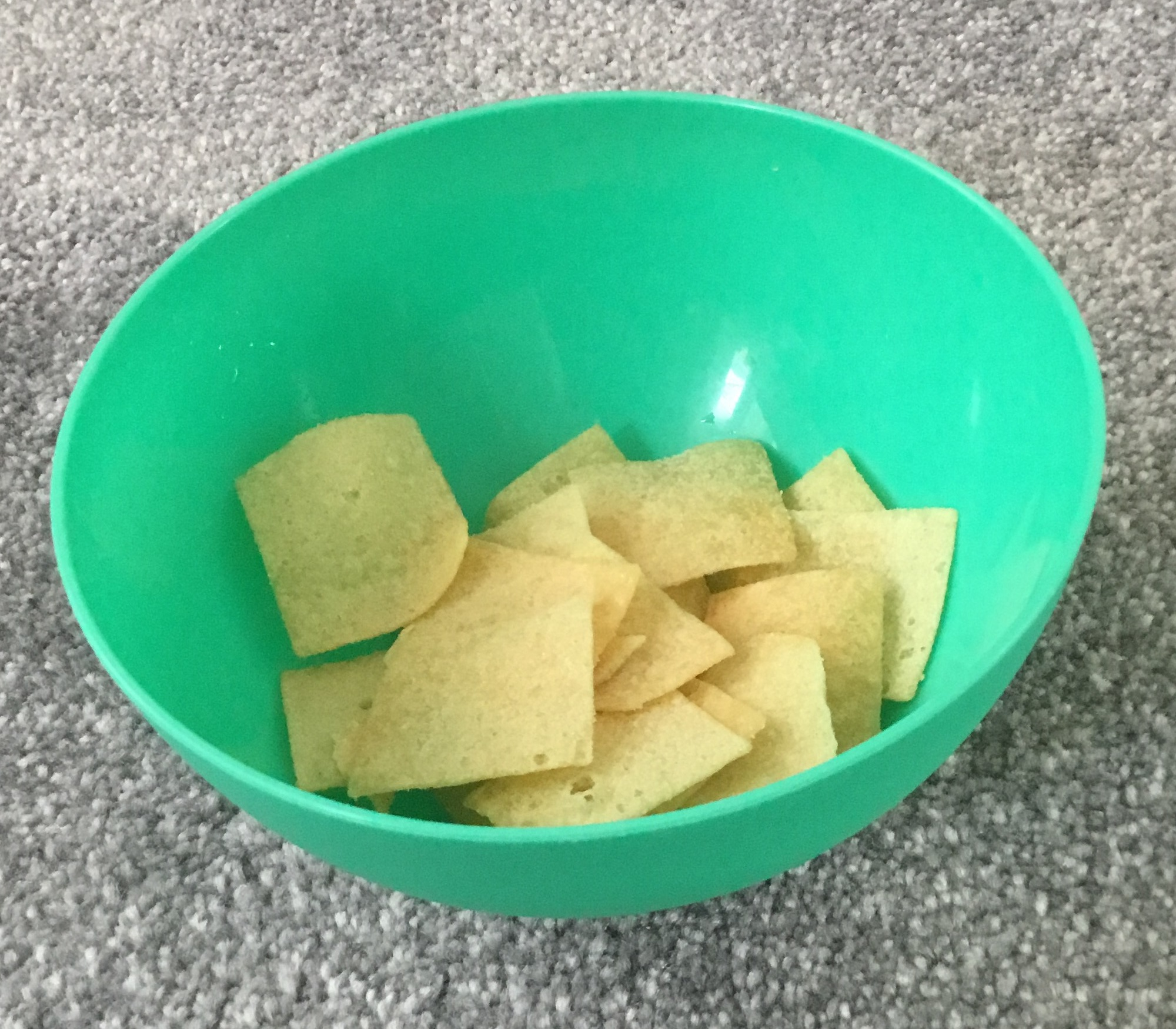
- Product type: Snack
- Current owner: Walkers
- Country: United Kingdom
- Introduced: 1978
- Related brands: French Fries; Quavers; Wotsits
- Previous owners: Smiths Food Group

Squares, formerly known as Square and Square Crisps, are a British brand of square-shaped snack made by Walkers, a subsidiary of PepsiCo, and sold in Britain. They were originally made by Smiths Food Group.

== History ==
The crisps have been around since at least 1978 and went under the name of Square Crisps. Several of their advertisements featured the comedian Lenny Henry and were marketed with slogans such as "more of a crunch than a crisp" and "the crisp that isn't a crisp". Following PepsiCo's acquisition of both Walkers and Smiths in 1989 Square Crisps were renamed to simply Square, and labelled as potato snacks.

The product remained under the Smiths brand years after its fellow products Quavers and Monster Munch were moved to the Walkers brand. In January 2001, Walkers announced to relaunch Square, and would transition it from the Smiths brand to the Walkers brand. The name of the crisps was changed to Squares shortly afterward.

=== Design ===
The design of Squares packets have changed several times. The design during the 1980s emphasised that they had 25% lower fat than regular crisps and the packaging of the salt and vinegar Squares was a much lighter shade of blue than what is currently used. During the 1990s and early 2000s, the most noticeable change apart from the change in company and name was the addition of a jagged border around the logo. In the late 2000s, the logo and design of Squares was briefly changed again. In the 2010s a new design for Squares was introduced which took aspects from other designs and is similar to the current design introduced in 2019 except for the jagged border and squares pattern. The colours of the crisps packets differ from Walkers traditional colours, with the salt & vinegar packets being blue instead of green and the cheese & onion packets being green instead of blue.

== Overview ==
They are produced in three flavours: salt & vinegar, ready salted, and cheese & onion. They are also available in multipacks, with salt & vinegar flavoured Squares being the most popular. Comedian Richard Osman wrote in The World Cup of Everything that Squares were invented because "scientists were concerned that children weren't hurting the roofs of their mouths as often as they should be".
