= Cheezies =

Brand of cheese puff snack food

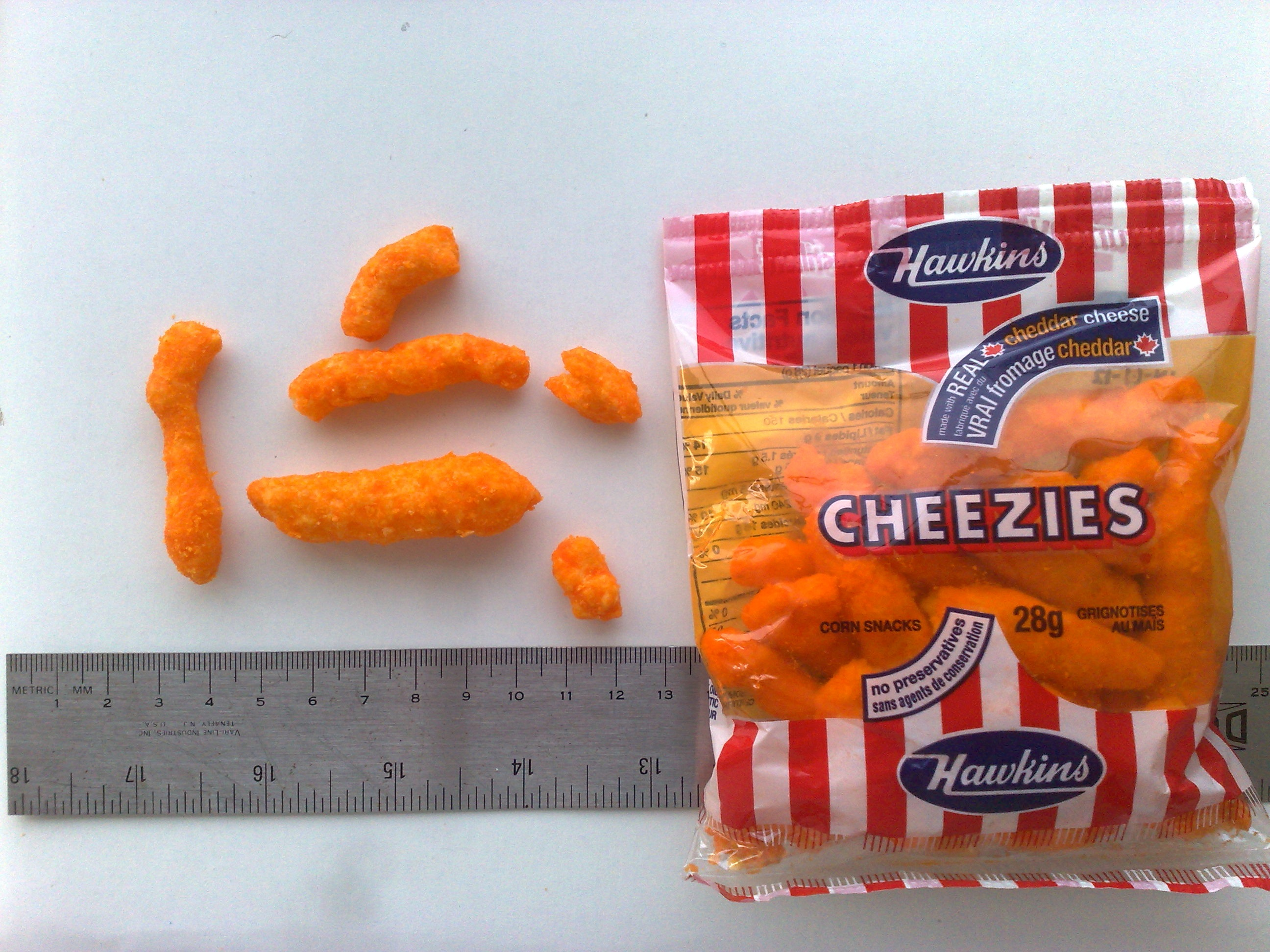
Cheezies along with packaging

Cheezies are a brand of cheese puff snack food made and sold in Canada by W. T. Hawkins Ltd. The snack is made from extruded cornmeal covered in powdered cheddar cheese, and sold in distinctive red-and-white bags.

== History ==
The snack was invented after the Second World War by James Marker of Dayton, Ohio, and W. T. Hawkins. The pair were living in Chicago when they discovered a method, by trial and error, of extruding cornmeal, casting it into fingerling shapes, then deep frying it in vegetable shortening and sprinkling it with cheddar cheese. Production was moved to Tweed, Ontario, in 1949 where the recipe was refined and the W. T. Hawkins Ltd. plant established.

Production was moved to a factory in Belleville, Ontario, in 1956 after a fire destroyed the original plant in Tweed. They concentrated exclusively on Cheezies after dropping other snack foods from their portfolio. The snack has been produced in the same facility ever since and continues to be sold across Canada. Marker's original machine is still used to manufacture Cheezies at the company's plant, as of 2012. Marker remained vice president of the W. T. Hawkins Company until his death in 2012.

On September 19, 2016, a storage warehouse for W. T. Hawkins in Belleville also was destroyed by fire.

== Competition ==
Old Dutch Foods produced two similar products in the 1970s, cheese-flavoured and barbecue-flavoured "Crunchys". The latter were discontinued and Old Dutch continues to produce the Crunchys in two cheese flavours.

== See also ==
- List of Canadian inventions and discoveries
- Canadian cuisine
- Wotsits
