= James Marker =

James Marker (June 27, 1921 – May 2, 2012) was an American-born Canadian businessman who invented Cheezies, a brand of cheese curl snack food popular in Canada. Marker also established the Belleville Aerodrome, a private airport, in 1961.

Marker was born in Dayton, Ohio. Marker, who was originally a farmer, worked within the confectionery industry in Chicago, Illinois, for many years. However, Marker invented a new machine used to process cornmeal. The machine caught the attention of Marker's business partner, W. T. Hawkins. Together, Marker and Hawkins moved to Canada and founded the W. T. Hawkin Company in 1949, which manufactures the Cheezies snack. Marker and Hawkin originally started their new company in Tweed, Ontario, to take advantage of the areas railroads to ship their Cheezies. A fire destroyed their original Tweed factory in 1956, and they relocated to their company's current location in Belleville, Ontario.

They concentrated exclusively on Cheezies after dropping other snack foods from their portfolio. Marker designed the machine used to create Cheezies, which shaped the snacks, cooked them in vegetable shortening, and coated the snacks with aged cheddar. No two Cheezies pieces are exactly alike. Marker's original machine is still used to manufacture Cheezies at the company's plant, as of 2012. Marker remained Vice President of the W. T. Hawkin Company until his death in 2012. He last visited the Cheezies factory for a surprise inspection in March 2012.Outside of the snack food industry, Marker established the Belleville Aerodrome in Ontario in 1961 and in 1972 established a flying school and air charter business, Loyal Air Ltd. He frequently used the airport to fly his Apache plane.

Marker died on May 2, 2012, at his home in Belleville, Ontario, at the age of 90. The W. T. Hawkin's Cheezies factory closed for the remainder of the day upon news of Marker's death.
