= Curl (Japanese snack) =

Japanese snack food

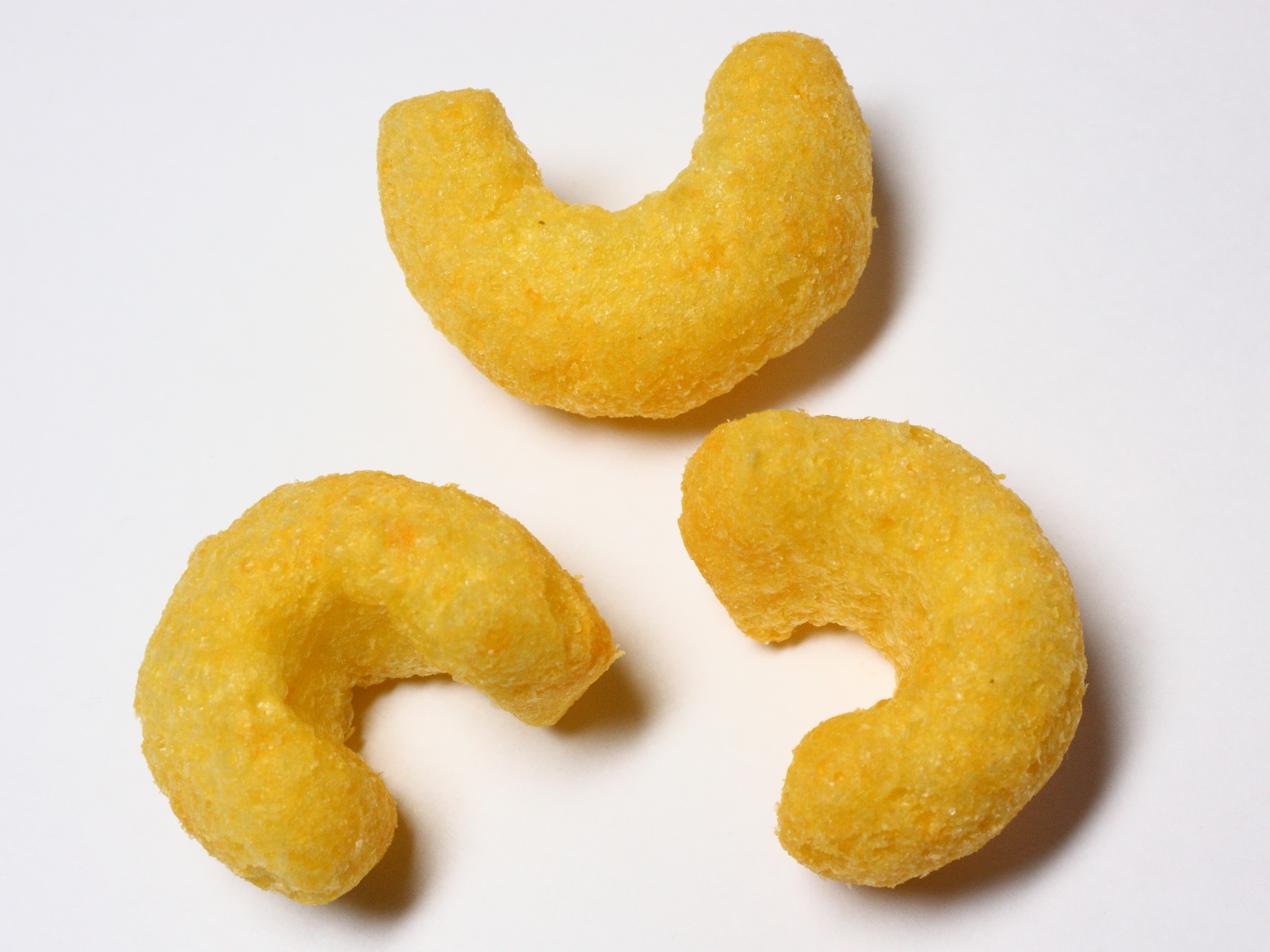
- Product type: Puffcorn
- Current owner: Meiji
- Country: Japan
- Markets: Japan
- Website: Official site (Japanese)

Curl (カール, Kāru) is a brand of Kombu Dashi taste corn puffs/cheesy flavour corn puffs snack in Japan sold by Meiji. It also sports its own mascot, Karl, in which the snack may be romanized Karl instead. Although Curl comes in several flavors, the two dominant ones are Kombu Dashi lightly salted and cheese.

It has been on sale in Japan continuously since 1968, although it is no longer distributed around eastern Japan since 2017.
