= Quavers =

British crisp brand

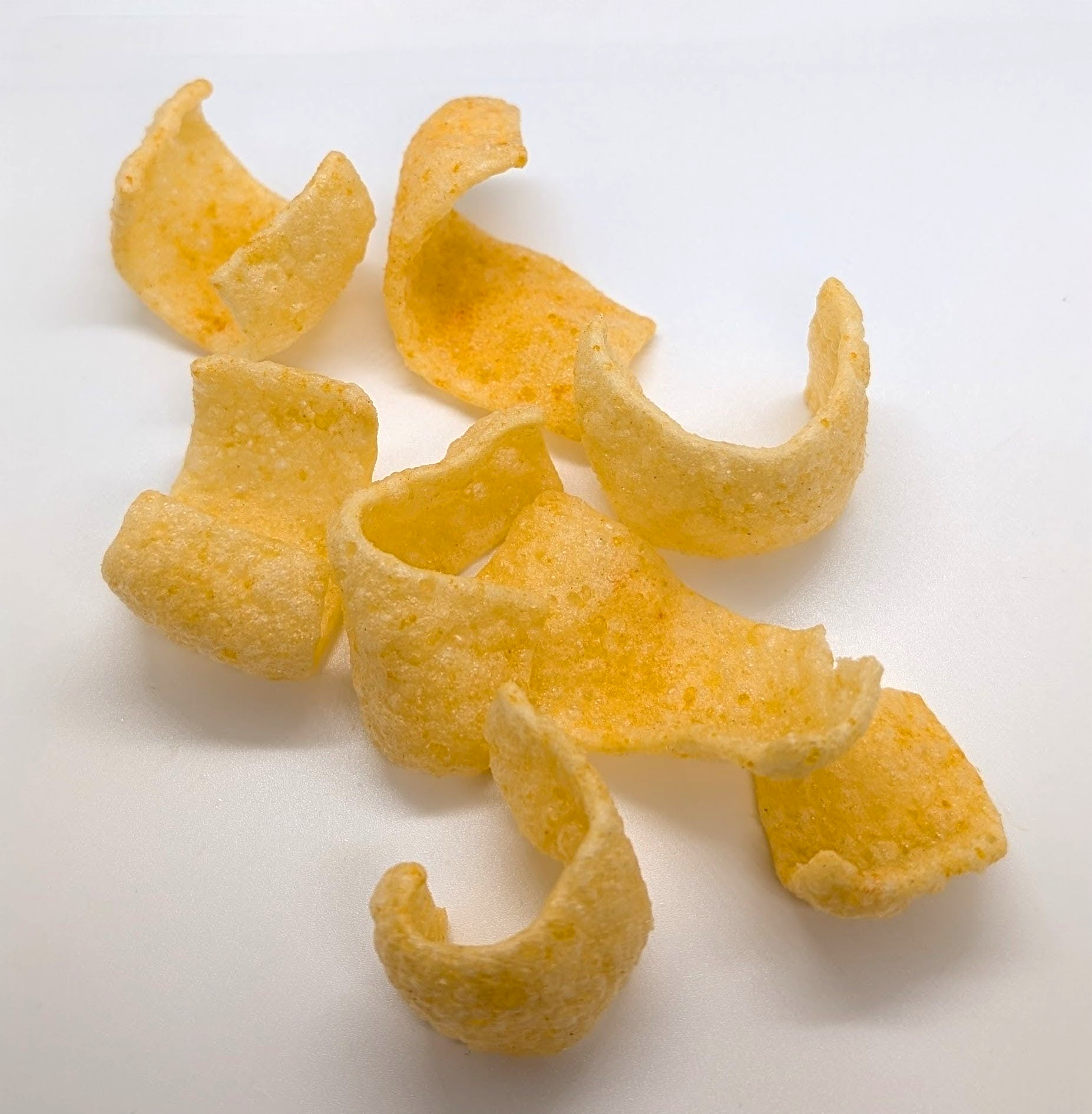
- Cheese flavour Quavers
- Product type: Cheese curls
- Current owner: Walkers
- Country: United Kingdom
- Introduced: 1968; 58 years ago
- Markets: United Kingdom, Ireland
- Previous owners: Smiths

Quavers are a British deep-fried potato-based snack food produced by Walkers, originally launched by Smiths in 1968. The name comes from the musical note called a quaver, as both the note and the crisp have a curly shape.

== History ==
Quavers were originally made by Smiths in their factory on Newark Road in the Bracebridge area of Lincoln, Lincolnshire in 1968. It launched with the advertising slogan "you get a lovely lot of Quavers in a bag", described as "curly potato puffs". The brand was originally sold in cheese and smoky bacon flavours, but over the years flavours like Spicy Beef, Sweet and Sour, Prawn Cocktail, and Ketchup were also part of the range.

The packaging brand name had changed from Smiths to Walkers in 1993. The same year, a Salt and Vinegar flavour was added to the range.

In March 1996, Walkers relaunched Quavers with a new look and advertising campaign produced by Aardman Animations, featuring new mascot Quentin Quaverhead and his family, who represent the "lightness" of the product. The relaunch also tied in with the launch of a new flavour, Tangy Tomato.

In 1997, the brand was part of Walkers' short-lived "Snackshack" range. and the product was relaunched with slightly updated packaging in 1998 during Walkers' branding refresh, alongside the reintroduction of the Prawn Cocktail flavour with a new recipe. In 1999, the brand was relaunched with a new logo and a new recipe for the Cheese flavour. Another branding refresh occurred in 2000.

In August 2002, a "Streaky Bacon" flavour was added to the range, which contained pink and brown pieces, that resembled bacon. In September 2004, Ghost-shaped Cheese Quavers were released for Halloween, and returned in September 2005.

In February 2007, Walkers changed the packaging for Quavers, Wotsits, Squares, French Fries and Monster Munch. This packaging reflected the usage of sunseed oil, which was used in all products. The Multipack bags were in a different layout, being in landscape orientation. Quavers' logo was changed slightly, and the flavours remained the same.

In December 2009, Quavers, Wotsits, Squares, and French Fries all changed their packaging again to coincide with a "99 Calories or Less" range with a consumers' focus on "New Year New Me".

By 2012, the Prawn Cocktail and Salt and Vinegar flavours were discontinued.Ketchup and sweet and sour flavours were also introduced, but for a limited time only and are no longer available.

In December 2020, Walkers announced that the Prawn Cocktail and Salt and Vinegar flavours would return to shelves in February 2021 due to popular demand.

In March 2023, the brand was given a packaging refresh and the introduction of a BBQ Sauce flavour. In July 2025, a Red Leicester flavour was introduced.

== Description ==
The primary ingredient in Quavers is potato starch. They are deep fried to give a snack with a similar texture to krupuk (prawn crackers), but have a different flavour and are smaller with a curled-up rectangle shape (similar in cross-section to a quaver).

A one pack (16.4 g) serving of regular Quavers contains 88 calories, of which 44 are from fat. Quavers contain a mixture of fats (4.9g): saturated fat 0.4g, polyunsaturated fat 0.6g and monounsaturated fat 3.8g. The sodium content is 170 mg. Quavers have 86 calories in their Cheese flavour and 83 in the salt and vinegar variety.

== Varieties ==
=== Current ===
- Cheese
- BBQ Sauce
- Red Leicester

=== Former ===
- Bacon
- Cheese and Onion
- Chinese Spicy Beef
- Ketchup
- Prawn cocktail
- Salt and Vinegar
- Sweet and Sour
