= Monster Munch =

Baked corn snack

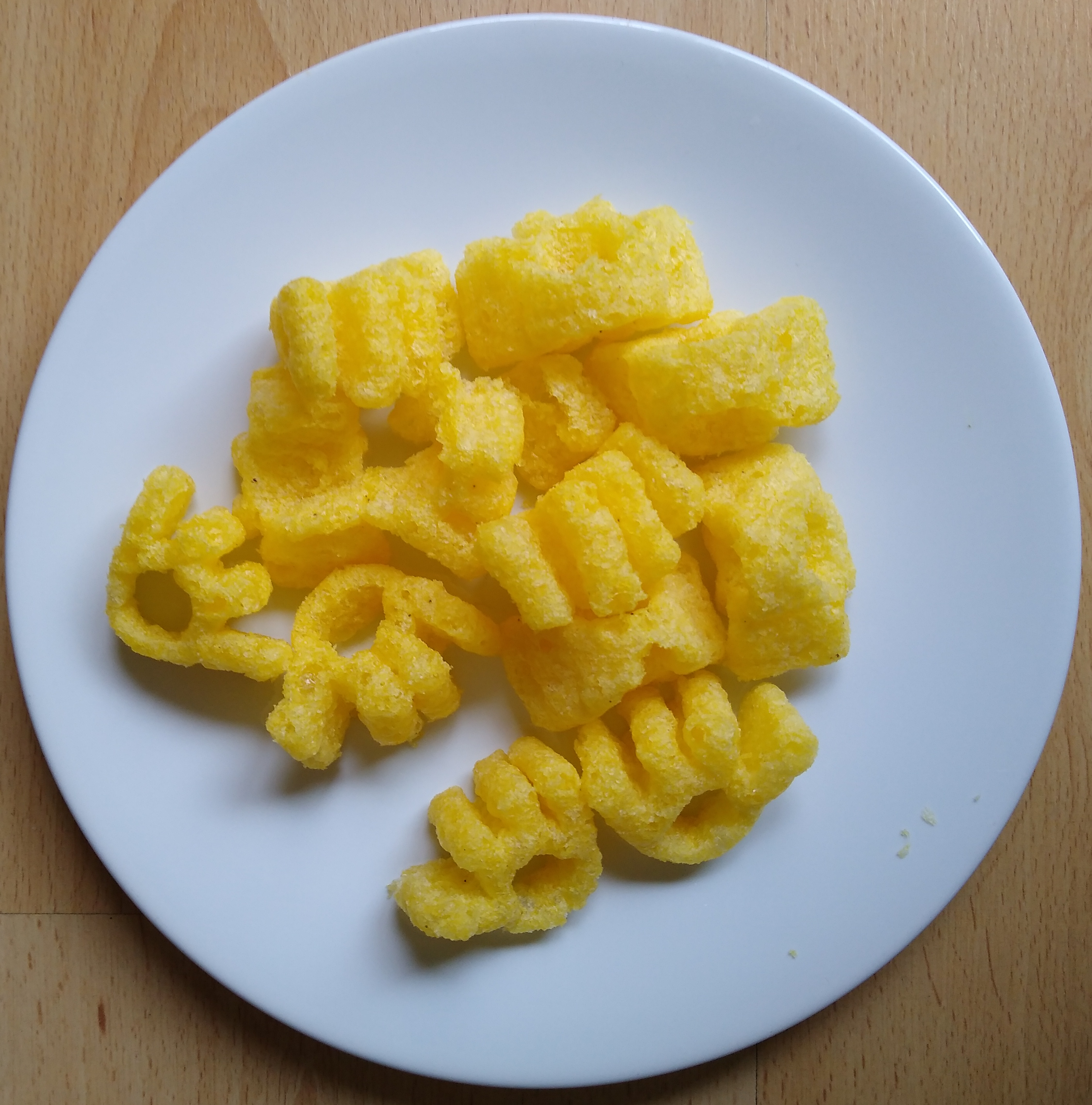
- Pickled onion Monster Munch
- Product type: Crisps
- Current owner: Walkers
- Country: United Kingdom
- Introduced: 1977; 49 years ago
- Markets: United Kingdom
- Previous owners: Smiths Food Group

Monster Munch are a British baked corn snack created by Smiths in 1977 and currently manufactured by Walkers. They are widely consumed in Britain. Flavours include Roast Beef, Pickled Onion, and Sweet and Spicy Flamin' Hot, and they are suitable for vegetarians.

On the issue of whether the snacks are shaped like monster claws or individual monsters, Walkers said "whilst we think of them as monsters' feet, we don't want that to stop people from coming up with their own imaginative ideas."

== Smiths Monster Munch (1977–1995) ==
Monster Munch snacks were launched in Britain in 1977 by Smiths. Originally called "The Prime Monster", they were renamed "Monster Munch" in 1978. The original name was part of a wider campaign, and was a play on "The Prime Minister". Advertised as "The Biggest Snack Pennies Can Buy" – in reference to the large size of the snacks – each pack featured a different monster on the front of the packet.

The snack was supported by a "Monster Munch Club", whose members received a "Monster Munch Munchers" membership pack which included a membership card, pen, several story books, and a story tape which included six "tall stories" and accompanying songs.

=== Flavours ===
The original Monster Munch monsters as featured on a promotional badge from the 1980s

By the late 1980s there were four main monsters featured on the packaging, although originally a total of six featured in the advertising.

Colour	Description	Flavour
Pink Monster	A tall, pink, gangly creature with a floppy tongue and wheels for feet	Roast Beef
Blue Monster	A blue creature with blue nose, four feet, four arms and long floppy ears, and wears a hat	Saucy/Sizzling Bacon/Salt and Vinegar
Yellow Monster	A yellow, one-eyed creature with a red nose, green mouth and mismatched limbs	Pickled Onion/Cheese and Onion/Saucy
Orange Monster	A fat, orange creature with pink hair	Giant Prawn/Pickled Onion

The original flavour for Monster Munch when it launched was Roast Beef, followed by Pickled Onion flavours a year later and Saucy in 1981.

In the mid-80s, Sizzling Bacon was introduced, while Cheese & Onion, Giant Prawn and Salt & Vinegar flavours were introduced in 1986.

The original Monster Munch used two different snack shapes, related to two of the Monsters. The shape known as a "monster paw" that is still used today has long been the subject of dispute over whether it represents a paw or, instead, the single eye and lashes of Yellow Monster (currently seen on Pickled Onion flavour packs). The other represented the gangly, long-tongued Pink Monster: circular with two bumps on the top for eyes, protrusions on either side and a tongue dangling down.

A short-lived range of Monster Munch themed drinks - Monster Fizz - was available in the 1980s. The small range of flavours included orangeade, cola and lemonade.

In 1993, the Monster Munch brand was moved from the Smiths brand to the Walkers brand. The packaging was given a final change with larger pictures of each monster eating the product. The Sizzling Bacon flavour was reformatted as "Smokey Spiders", with spider-shaped corn instead of paws.

In 1994, Mega Monster Munch was introduced, which came in bigger bags in Flamin' Hot flavour.

== Walkers Monster Munch (1995–2008) ==
In 1995, Walkers relaunched the Monster Munch brand with a range of four flavours. A new lineup of monsters were introduced and the original shapes of the snack were replaced with a smaller shaped paw using a twin screw extruder instead of the single screw extruders used before. The base ingredients were changed to 100% maize and the overall salt content reduced.

Monster	Years	Description	Height	Weight	Chest	Occupation	Favourite Food	Favourite Drink	Flavour Mascot for:
Pink Monster	1995–1997	A tall, pink creature with a wide mouth.	N/A	N/A	N/A	N/A	N/A	N/A	Beef Burger
Blue/Yellow Monster	1995–2000	A furry creature with an inverted head. He was recoloured yellow in 1997 after the introduction of the Cheesy flavour.	3 Metres	30 Stone	50 cm	Monster	Cheese (Red Leicester)	Pepsi Max	Spaghetti Sauce (1995–1997); Cheesy (1997–2000)
Red Monster	1995–2008	A large, red ogre-like creature.	4 Metres	120 Stone	2.8 Metres	Monster	Curry Jelly	Chilli Milkshake	Flamin' Hot (1997–2008)
Orange Monster	1995–2008	An orange ogre-like creature.	2.3 Metres (crouched)	60 Stone	2 Metres	Monster	Broccoli Ice Cream	Onion Juice	Pickled Onion
Purple Monster	2000–2002	A tall creature with a wide mouth.	3.5 Metres	90 Stone	1 Metre	Monster	Jelly con Carne	Ginger Beer	Spicy
Pink Monster	2002–2008	A pink ogre-like creature.	3 Metres	90 Stone	1.5 Metres	Monster	Carrot Custard	Gravy Milkshake	Roast Beef
Fabrizio	2003	A large monster that resembles melted Vanilla Ice Cream, topped with a wafer and cherry. He is the only monster to have a proper name.	1.6 Metres	8465 litres	Variable	Chillin' Out	Himself	N/A	Vanilla Ice Cream

Alongside the returning Pickled Onion and Flamin' Hot (Mega Monster Munch only), two new flavours, Beef Burger and Spaghetti Sauce, were introduced. A wide range of Tazos, featuring images of the monsters, was produced, with one Tazo included in each bag.

Since then, various packaging changes and new flavours have been introduced. Monster Munch was later part of Walkers' short-lived "Snackshack" lineup during 1997–1998. A New Cheesy flavour replaced the Spaghetti Sauce Flavour at this time, and the Blue Monster was recoloured Yellow. Flamin' Hot was later introduced in the multipacks at this time, replacing Beef Burger.

In April 1998, when Walkers changed its logo, Monster Munch changed their packaging and introduced a new logo. A Spicy flavour was released in August 2000, replacing Cheesy (with the Yellow Monster being retired in the process) and a new Purple Monster (which looked like the Pink Monster from the first era) was the main monster for that flavour.

In August 2001, Walkers announced a special Halloween variant of the Pickled Onion flavour that could turn the consumer's tongue blue, and was promoted with The Beano and The Dandy comics and three ten-second spots that would air on Boomerang.

On 28 September 2002, Walkers announced that the "Tongue" variant of Pickled Onion would be reintroduced as a "Mystery Tongue" variant, where the consumer's tongue could turn either blue or green. On the same day, it was announced that the Roast Beef flavour would be reintroduced after a seven-year hiatus, replacing the Spicy flavour. The packaging said "NEW" on the top and in front of the pack, as it was not the same flavouring as the Roast Beef that was previously sold.

In February 2003, a "Baked Bean" flavour was released as part of Walkers' Comic Relief promotion., however, it was only included within multipacks with their Baked Bean crisps. On 21 April, another limited edition variety - "Vanilla Ice Cream" flavour was sold for 16 weeks and was released to a mostly negative reaction. Unlike any other Walkers product or any crisp for that matter, this variety was not savoury and swapped the salt with sugar.

In September 2004, the Tongue variant returned as "Spooky Tongue", consolidating with new Halloween-themed packaging and the introduction of "Ghost Shape" variant of Quavers. However, unlike the 2002 version, it reverted back solely to turning a consumer's tongue blue, like with the 2001 version. This version returned for one more year in 2005.

In February 2007, Walkers announced they would relaunch their snack range, including Monster Munch. The relaunch reflected the addition of Sunseed Oil to the product, similar to the refresh of the main Walkers Crisps range the year prior. The Multipack bags were in a different layout, being in Landscape style. For Monster Munch, while the logo and packaging were changed, the monsters (now depicted in CGI animation) and flavours remained the same.

== Walkers Monster Munch (2008–present) ==
In August 2008, Walkers announced that the brand would be relaunched again as "Mega Monster Munch" with a focus on nostalgia and an adult audience, following requests to revert the brand back to its previous state. With the relaunch, the crisps returned to their original larger size, and the packs include retro designs based on the original packs. A campaign titled "Find Our Monsters" began to coincide with the relaunch to find the original costumes used in the adverts, which had been lost for years after Walkers purchased the brand. A T-shirt promotion was held in the Autumn of 2009 for twelve weeks.

A Mega Monster Munch website was launched to coincide with the relaunch.

Monster	Description	Flavour
Pink Monster	A tall, pink, gangly creature with a floppy tongue	Roast Beef
Yellow Monster	A yellow, one-eyed creature with a red nose, green mouth and mismatched limbs	Pickled Onion/BBQ Sauce
Blue Monster	A hat-wearing blue creature with blue nose, four feet, long floppy-ears and four arms	Sweet and Spicy Flamin' Hot

A product called "Mega Monster Munch Webs" was sold starting from Halloween in September 2013 and came in a bacon flavour. This product has been popular enough to be released every Halloween after that. This product had previously been marketed under the Wotsits brand as "Wotsits Wafflers," when it was re-launched in July 2012, and was resold as simply "Wafflers" afterwards under the Smiths brand.

In 2016 Monster Munch Pickled Onion was voted the champion of the World Cup of Crisps.

In August 2019, the packaging was updated alongside other Walkers Snacks, to inform about a reduction in plastic used on the packet. The Walkers logo also returned to the front of the packaging for the first time in 11 years. The flavours and monsters remained the same.

Recreating Pickled Onion Monster Munch featured as a challenge in Channel 4's Snackmasters programme in 2019, featuring chefs Tristan Welch and Matt Worswick. The programme also looked at the production of Monster Munch at the Walkers Skelmersdale factory, including the raw ingredients, the extrusion process and flavouring. In addition, the programme suggested that 'Lily' is the name of the Pink Monster, as referred to by staff.

In February 2021, Walkers announced the launch of Monster Munch Giants, which are larger versions of the main product, similar to Wotsits Giants from the year prior. This variety is sold in Pickled Onion and Roast Beef.

In March 2024, the Flamin' Hot flavour was renamed to "Sweet and Spicy Flamin' Hot" to avoid confusion with Walkers' "Extra Flamin' Hot" brand. On 1 July, Walkers announced the "Yummy With" range of lower-salt snacks made with chickpea flour. A new Monster Munch flavour - BBQ Sauce, was introduced as part of this range.

== International variants ==
In Ireland, the major potato crisp and corn snack brand Tayto originally licensed the Monster Munch brand and its mascots for their own spicy flavoured corn snack. Upon the movement of Walkers into the Irish market in the 1990s, the name "Monster Munch" was purchased from Tayto. As such, the product was rebranded to Mighty Munch to differentiate between the Tayto and Walker snacks.

In New Zealand, the major potato crisp brand Eta has been manufacturing a baked corn snack with the name "Monster Munch" since the late 1980s. Like the Irish counterpart, the New Zealand version originally launched with similar mascots from the British-based version, with a different range of flavours that includes crispy bacon, chicken rings, and burger bones. The product retains the Monster Munch name to this day but uses its own packaging style, with the current range of flavours including cheesy bacon and burger flavour.

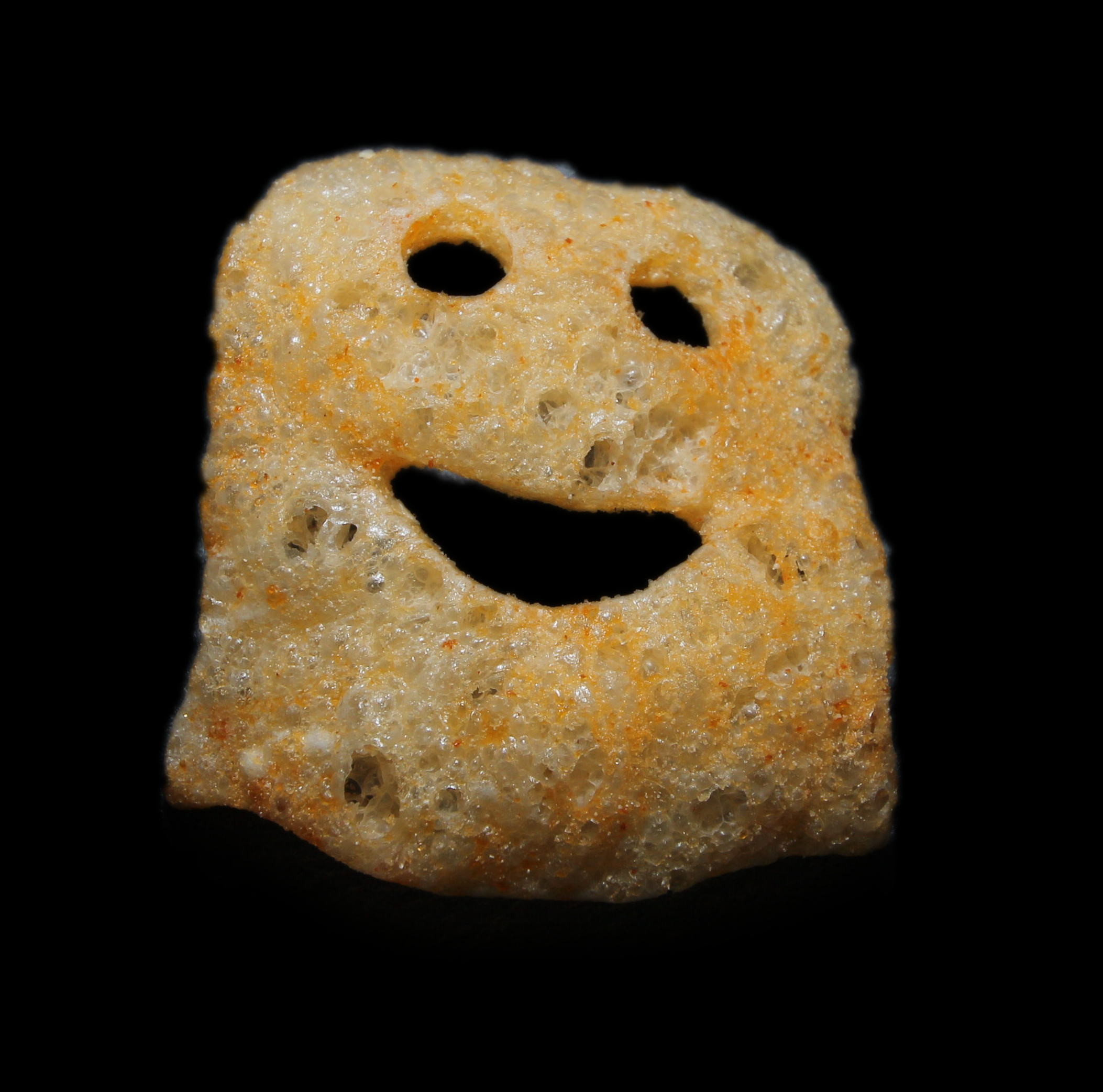
Monster Munch in France

In France, the major potato crisp brand Intersnack commercializes a range of flavoured potato chip-based snacks with the name "Monster Munch". The range of flavours includes ready salted, ham & cheese, barbecue, ketchup, pizza, and cream cheese. The monsters are smaller in size than British Monster Munch, much thinner, with a smiling ghost shape.
