= Corn snack =

Snack food made from corn (maize)

Corn snacks are snack foods made from corn (maize). They are often marketed, packaged and flavoured in a similar way to potato crisps.

== Extruded ==
Extruded corn snacks come in "puffed" and "crunchy" varieties. They include:

- Puffcorn
  - Cheese puffs and varieties (cheese curls, corn sticks, cheese balls, etc.)
  - Seasoned "fries" such as Andy Capp's fries
  - Umaibō, cylindrical corn snack from Japan
  - Bugles crispy cones

== Chips ==
- Corn chips
- Tortilla chips
- Rolled corn chips, such as Takis
- Pop Chips (popcorn chips)

== Other ==
- Corn nuts
- Popcorn
