= Elmer's Fine Foods =

New Orleans snack food company

- Industry: Snack Foods Manufacturing
- Founded: 1946
- Headquarters: 2404 Port Street, New Orleans, Louisiana
- Key people: Alan Elmer Sr., President
- Products: Snack food
- Website: Elmer's Quality Snacks

Elmer's Fine Foods, or just Elmer's, is a snack food company based in New Orleans, Louisiana. Elmer's started making snack products in 1946, including its popular CheeWees and Mardi Gras cheese curls sold in various southeastern states. Until their chocolate business was sold, they also specialized in the production of seasonal candies such as Heavenly Hash and Gold Bricks, that are popular in the Gulf Coast states. Their manufacturing plant and offices are located in the Ninth Ward, a part of New Orleans that was heavily flooded by Hurricane Katrina.

== History ==
Elmer Candy Company began in 1855 as Miller Candy Company, launched by Christopher Miller. Miller transferred the company to his son-in-law, Augustus Elmer, who changed the name to Miller-Elmer Candy. Elmer's five sons joined the business, and it became Elmer Candy Corporation around 1914.

During the Great Depression, the Elmer brothers developed a cornmeal-based cheese-curl snack. In 1939, the sales manager for Elmer's, Morel M. Elmer Sr., held a contest in New Orleans to name the famous cheese curls, and the winning entry was CheeWees. In 1946, Elmer's Fine Foods was formed to market their new cheese-curl product.

In 1963, the five sons of Augustus Elmer sold the Elmer Candy Corporation. By doing so, they forfeited the trademark names of the products, and Elmer's Fine Foods lost the ability to use the name CheeWees. For the next 30 years, the company marketed their famous cheese curls using the names Chee-T and Chee-Z-Snax.

In the 1980s, brothers Alan, Paul, and Stephen Elmer joined the business and began modernizing the company, adding products, and increasing sales. As president of Elmer's Fine Foods, Alan wanted to use his grandfather's trademarked CheeWees name. In 1993, Elmer's Fine Foods reacquired the naming rights from the Elmer Candy Corporation and began to once again sell CheeWees.

Following devastation from Hurricane Katrina on August 29, 2005, Elmer's Fine Foods was closed for 14 months while its infrastructure was rebuilt. The company re-opened in January 2007, and launched its company web site.

Brothers Alan, Stephen, and Paul are the fifth generation of the Elmer family to be in the food business in New Orleans. CheeWees are sold throughout Mississippi and Louisiana, and sales have expanded to national and international markets.

== Products ==
- CheeWees are produced in six flavors (original cheese, bar-b-que, hot-n-spicy, green onion, jalapeño, and "400 Hot Degreez". Their pizza flavor has been discontinued).
- Elmer's Popcorn is packaged ready-to-eat in caramel, cheese, "hot cheesy", and Creole Crunch (a mix of caramel and spicy popcorn) flavors.
- Elmer's Jumbo Peanuts are dry roasted and packaged in-shell.
- There are two limited edition Mardi Gras products: Mardi Gras Caramel Popcorn and Mardi Gras CheeWees.
- Elmer's CheeWees T-shirts

== See also ==
- Cheese puffs – Elmer's Fine Foods was involved in their development
