= Walkers (snack foods) =

British snack food manufacturer

Walkers Snack Foods Limited
- Logo used since 2026

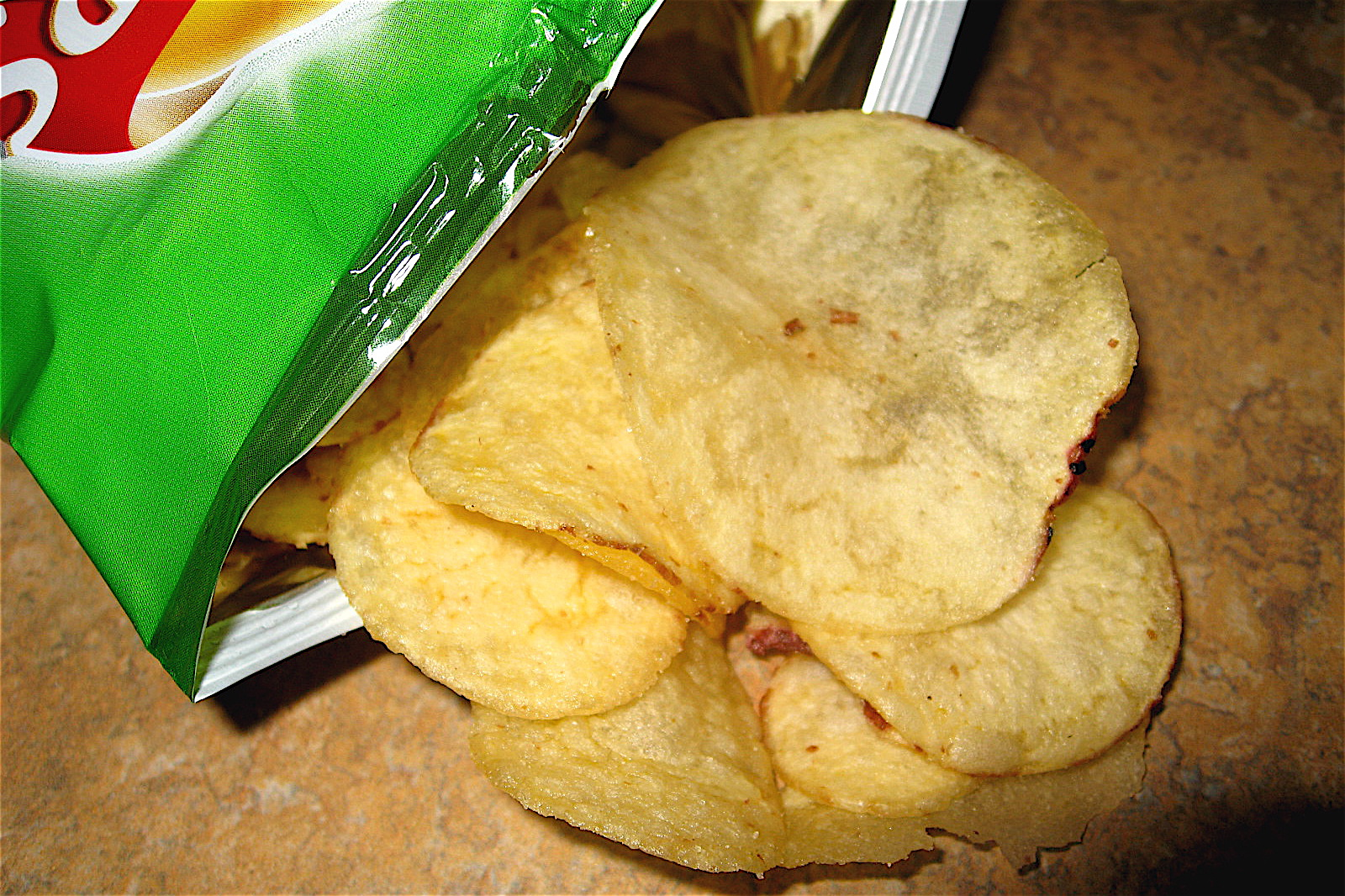
- Walkers Salt & Vinegar flavour (pictured) were launched in 1967.
- Trade name: Walkers
- Formerly: Walkers Crisps Holdings Limited (1989–1992); Walkers Smiths Snack Foods Limited (1992–1995); Walkers Snack Foods Limited (1995–present)
- Type: Subsidiary
- Industry: Food
- Founded: 1948; 78 years ago
- Founder: Henry Walker
- Headquarters: Leicester, England
- Area served: United Kingdom; Ireland
- Products: Potato crisps, snack foods
- Brands: Frazzles; Monster Munch; Quavers; Salt 'n' Shake; Smith's; Squares; Wotsits
- Owner: PepsiCo
- Parent: PepsiCo Holdings (Note: Pepsico Holdings is a private unlimited company registered in the United Kingdom. From 1980–1997, it was a private limited company known as PepsiCo Holdings Limited. It is wholly owned by US-based food and beverage corporation PepsiCo, Inc..)
- Website: walkers.co.uk

Walkers Snack Foods Limited, trading as Walkers, is a British snack food manufacturer operating in the Great Britain and Ireland markets. It manufactures potato crisps and snack foods both under its own brand and others, and is the largest crisp manufacturer in Britain. Walkers was founded in 1948 in Leicester, England, by Henry Walker. The Walker family sold the business in 1970 to the American food producer Standard Brands. Since 1989, Walkers has been under ownership of PepsiCo, owners of the US snack brand Frito-Lay.

The Walkers factory in Leicester, the largest crisp production plant in the world, produces over 11 million bags of crisps per day, using about 800 tons of potatoes. According to the BBC television programme Inside the Factory, production of a bag of crisps takes approximately 35 minutes from the moment the raw potatoes are delivered to the factory to the point at which finished product leaves the dispatch bay for delivery. Walkers sells crisps in a variety of flavours; the main are Cheese and Onion (introduced in 1954), Salt and Vinegar (introduced in 1967) and Ready Salted. Walkers also produces other snacks its under brands including Quavers, Sensations, Wotsits, Monster Munch, and Doritos.

Leicester-born former footballer Gary Lineker has been the face of Walkers since 1995, featuring in most of its advertising campaigns. Walkers has sponsored events such as the UEFA Champions League and the Super Cup. It employs over 4,000 people in 15 locations around the UK and the Walkers website states that an estimated "11 million people will eat a Walkers product every day".

== History ==
In the 1880s, Henry James Walker moved from Mansfield, Nottinghamshire to Leicester to take over an established butcher's shop in the High Street. Meat rationing in the UK after World War II saw the factory output drop dramatically, and so in 1948, Walkers & Sons started looking at alternative products. Potato crisps were becoming increasingly popular with the public; this led managing director R.E. Gerrard to shift the company focus and begin hand-slicing and frying potatoes.

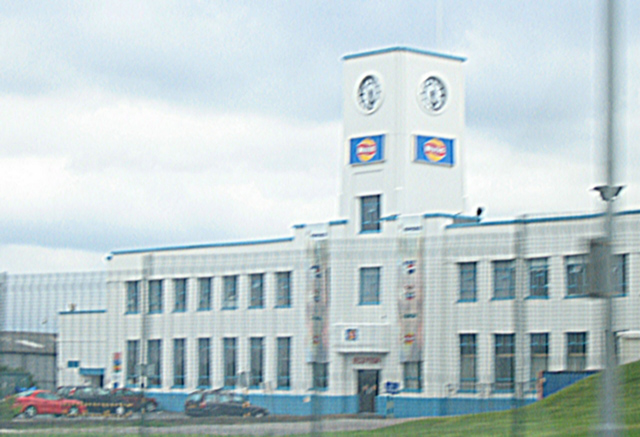
Walkers factory in Swansea, Wales

Prior to the 1950s, crisps were sold without flavour; Smith's of London sold plain potato crisps which came with a small blue sachet of salt that could be sprinkled over them. The first crisps manufactured by Walkers in 1948 were sprinkled with salt and sold for threepence a bag. After Archer Martin and Richard Synge (while working in Leeds) received a Nobel Prize for the invention of partition chromatography in 1952, food scientists began to develop flavours via a gas chromatograph, a device that allowed scientists to understand chemical compounds behind complex flavours such as cheese. In 1954, the first flavoured crisps were invented by Joe “Spud” Murphy (owner of the Irish company Tayto) who developed a technique to add cheese and onion seasoning during production. Later that year, Walkers introduced Cheese and Onion (inspired by the Ploughman's lunch), and Salt and Vinegar was launched in 1967 (inspired by the nation's love of fish and chips).

The Walker family sold the company in 1970 to the American food producer Standard Brands, who in turn merged with another American food company Nabisco to form Nabisco Brands in 1981. Prawn Cocktail flavour was introduced in the 1970s (inspired by the 1970s popular starter of prawn cocktail) along with Roast Chicken flavour (inspired by the nation's roast dinner). In 1982, Nabisco purchased Associated Biscuits, owners of rival Smith's. In 1988, RJR Nabisco was purchased in a leverage buyout by Kohlberg Kravis Roberts & Co, and to reduce debt several businesses were sold to French conglomerate BSN, who quickly sold on Smith's and Walkers to PepsiCo in 1989. At the time of the purchase by PepsiCo, Walkers had a third of the crisp market in the United Kingdom, while Smith's had a third of the extruded snacks market, making them the market leader.

=== Under PepsiCo ownership (since 1989) ===
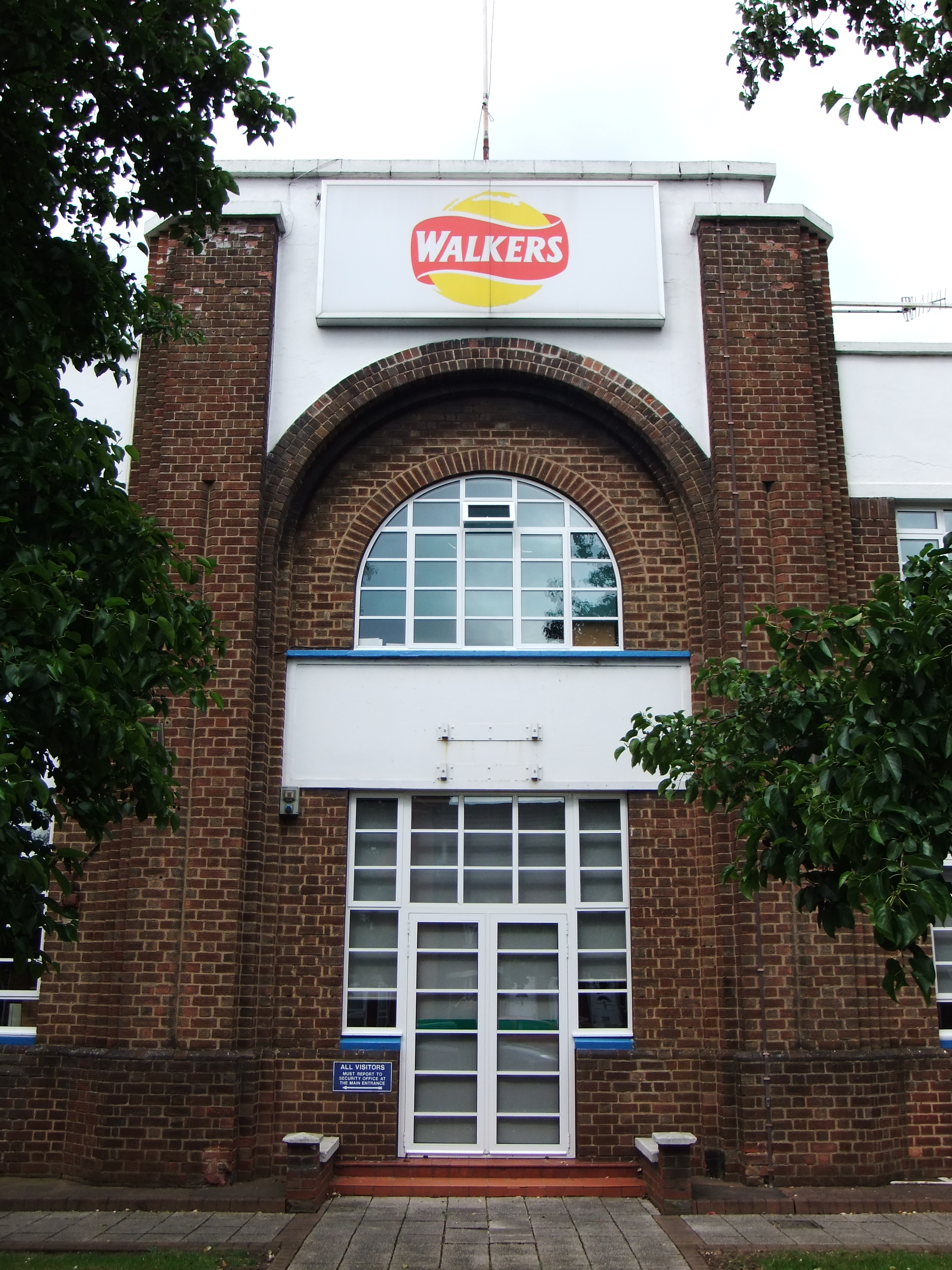
Front entrance to Walkers factory in Lincoln, England

Many of Walkers brands were formerly branded under the Smiths Crisps name. This comes from the time when Walkers, Smiths and Tudor Crisps were the three main brands of Nabisco's UK snack division, with Tudor being marketed mainly in the north of England and Smiths in the south. After the takeover by PepsiCo, the Tudor name was dropped, and the Smiths brand has become secondary to Walkers. The only products retaining the Smiths brand are Salt & Vinegar and Ready Salted Chipsticks, Frazzles and the "Savoury Selection", which includes Bacon Flavour Fries, Scampi Flavour Fries and Cheese Flavoured Moments. To promote the freshness of its products, Walkers began to package them in foil bags from 1993, then from 1996, began filling them with nitrogen instead of air.

In June 1999, PepsiCo transferred ownership of its Walkers brands out of Britain and into a Swiss subsidiary, Frito-Lay Trading GmbH. Subsequently, according to The Guardian, the "UK tax authorities managed to claw back less than a third of what they might" have received had an unchanged structure continued producing the same sort of level of UK profits and tax as Walkers Snack Foods had in 1998. Subsequently, Walkers is now a directly owned subsidiary of PepsiCo.

Walkers became the brand name of Smiths' Quavers (in 1993) and Monster Munch (in 1995) snacks. In 1999, Walkers launched Max, a brand with a range of thick, crinkle-cut crisps to compete with McCoy's, the UK's best-selling crinkle-cut brand, and a new-look Quavers in March 1999. In April 2000, another of the Max flavours called Red Hot Max was launched and then Naked Max in June 2000. In February 2000, a new-look Cheetos was relaunched, serving as the only cheesy snack in the UK. In July 2000, the Quavers packaging was updated. In March 2001, Squares crisps, which had been marketed as Smith's, were rebranded under the Walkers brand. In November 2001, more Max flavours were introduced. They included chargrilled steak and chip shop curry.

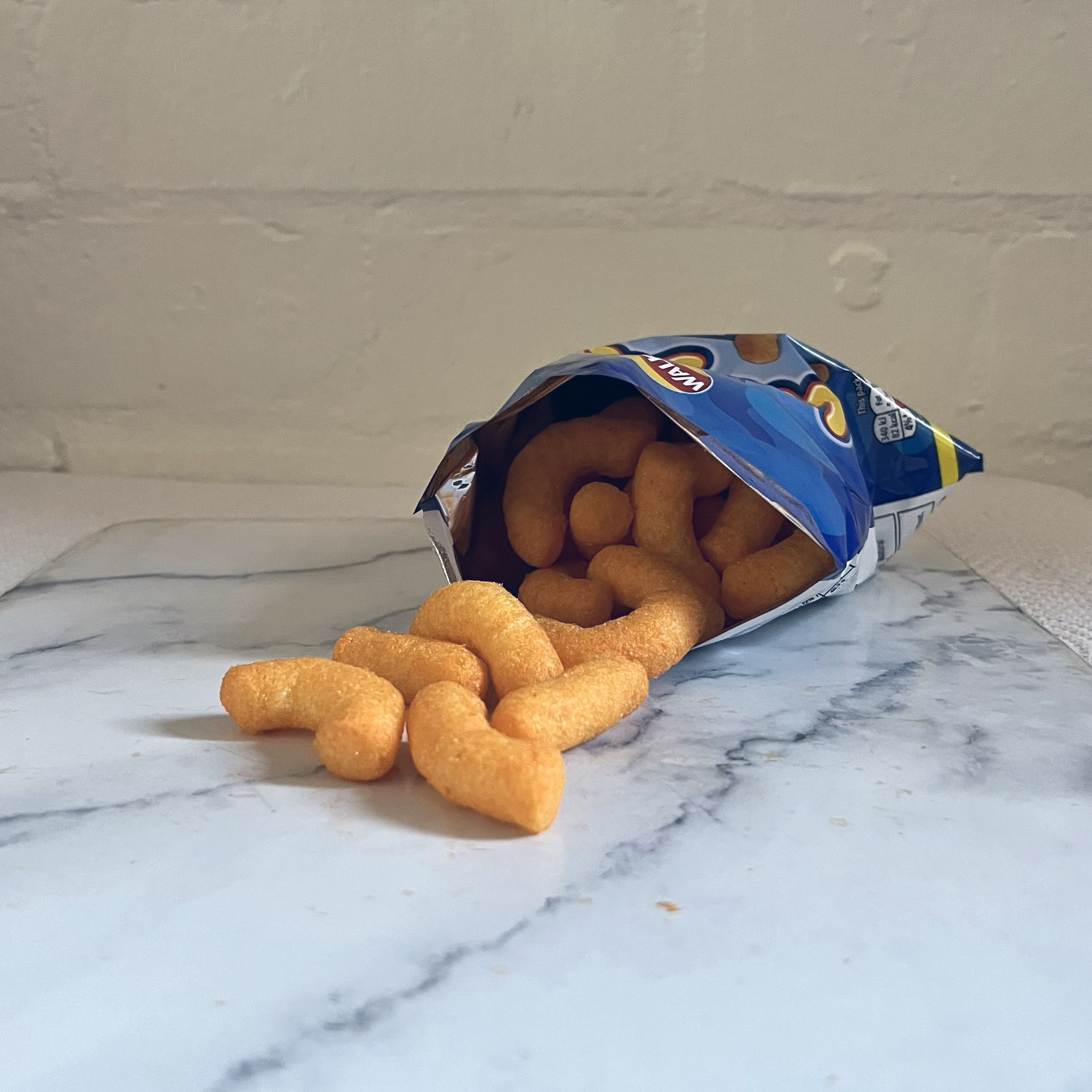
After buying the brand from Golden Wonder, Walkers has produced Wotsits since 2003

In May 2002, Walkers launched Sensations. Sensations flavours include Thai Sweet Chilli, Roast Chicken & Thyme, Balsamic Vinegar & Caramelised Onion. In January 2003, Smiths brand Salt 'n' Shake were relaunched under the Walkers identity. In January 2003 Walkers bought Wotsits from Golden Wonder, which replaced Cheetos during December 2002. In April 2004, Walkers launched a Flamin' Hot version of Wotsits, which replaced BBQ beef, and then Wotsits Twisted, a range of cheese puffs in July 2004. In September 2007, Walkers launched Sunbites, a healthier range of lower/better fat crisps made using whole grains.

In February 2006, Walkers changed its brand label and typeset. It also announced it would reduce the saturated fat in its crisps by 70%. It started frying its crisps in "SunSeed" oil, as claiming the oil is higher in monounsaturated fat content than the standard sunflower oil which it had used previously, establishing its own sunflower farms in Ukraine and Spain to be able to produce sufficient quantities of the oil. Walkers updated its packaging style in June 2007, moving to a brand identity reminiscent of the logo used from 1998 to 2006.

Walkers "Do Us a Flavour" campaign in 2009 (promoted by Leicester-born former footballer Gary Lineker), where the public voted on a new flavour to become permanent

In July 2008, Walkers launched its "Do Us a Flavour" campaign, challenging the public to think up unique flavours for its crisps. Consumers could vote on their favourite, and the winner would become a permanent flavour. In January 2009 six flavours were chosen from among the entries and released as special editions, available until May 2009. During this period, consumers could vote on their favourite, and the winner would become a permanent flavour. The winner was Builder's Breakfast by Emma Rushin from Belper in Derbyshire. This flavour was discontinued a year later, in May 2010, in order for Walkers to focus on the upcoming 'Flavour Cup'.

In 2009, Walkers launched its premium "Red Sky" brand of "all natural" potato crisps and snacks. It was stated that Red Sky products were made from 100% natural ingredients, and that the makers "work in partnership with Cool Earth", a charity that protects endangered rainforest; Walkers made charitable donations proportionate to the number of purchases of Red Sky snacks. Walkers discontinued the range in 2014 following poor sales.

In early 2013, Walkers revised its packaging, with a new design and typeface. Slogans such as 'Distinctively Salt & Vinegar' and 'Classically Ready Salted' were added to the front of packs. The previous packaging design had only existed for 12 months. Along with this packaging design, there came news that the company would begin using real meat products in its Smoky Bacon and Roast Chicken flavoured crisps. This prompted opposition from vegetarians and vegans, who were now unable to eat these flavours. However, in 2016 Walkers returned to flavourings that were vegetarian.

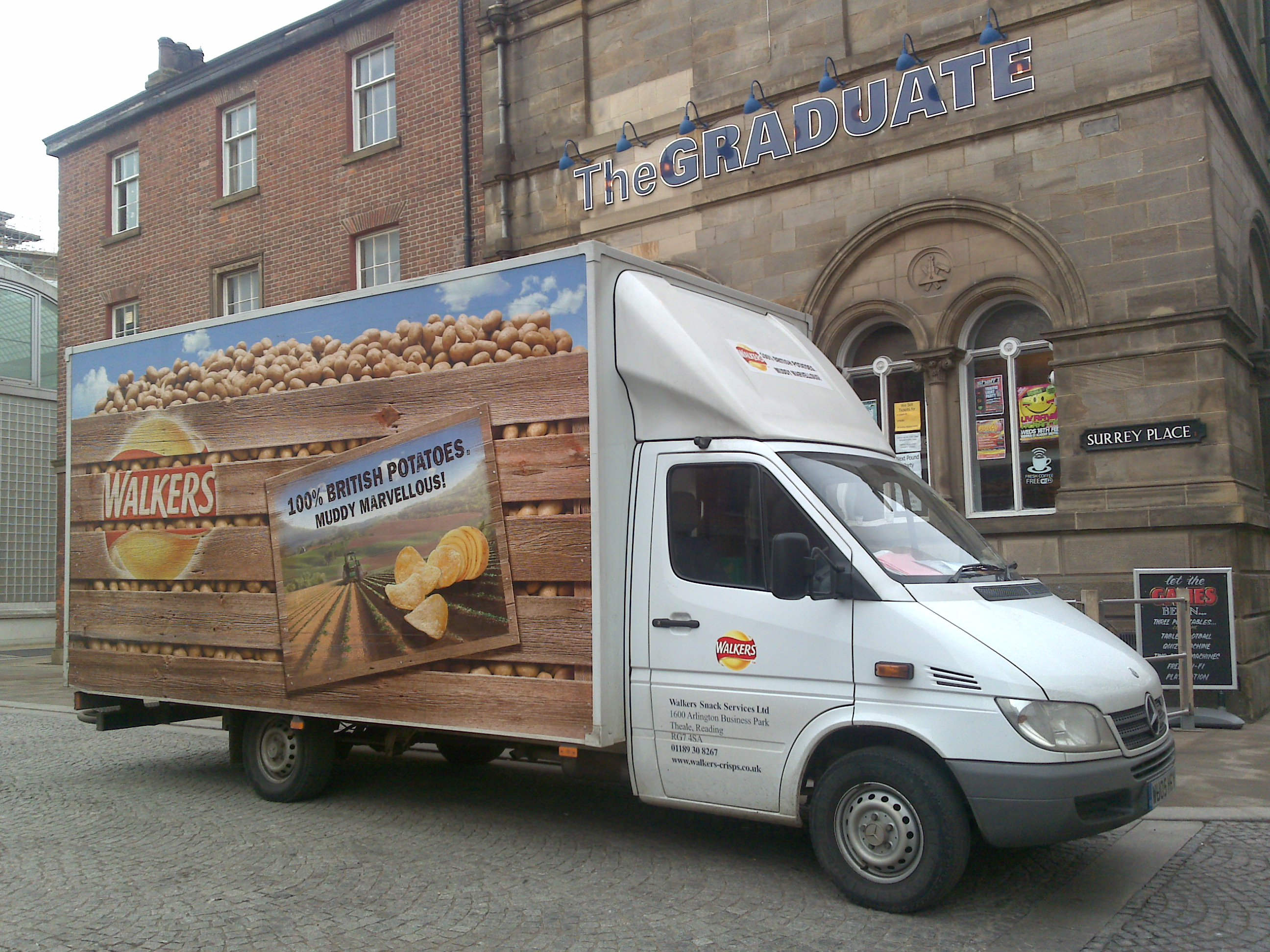
A Walkers delivery van emblazoned with "100% British potatoes"

As of 2018, Walkers came under pressure from campaigners to change its packaging due to its contribution to litter and plastic pollution. As part of the protest a marine biology student wore a crisp packet dress to her graduation. She claimed the dress was inspired by litter she had seen on a beach. In September 2018, the Royal Mail appealed to customers to stop posting empty crisp packets to Walkers, which campaigners had asked people to do and "flood Walkers social media with pictures of us popping them in the post". Royal Mail was obliged by law to deliver the bags to Walkers' freepost address, but without envelopes they could not go through machines and had to be sorted by hand, causing delays.

In 2018, Walkers launched six new flavours to celebrate the brand's seventieth birthday, with each flavour representing a different decade. In January 2019, Walkers unveiled new packaging for its main range, celebrating its British heritage through its design. The new packaging features the Walkers logo in the middle of each packet rather than centre-top, alongside a new series of illustrations which are laid out in the shape of a Union Jack flag, and feature icons and landmarks such as London's Big Ben and red telephone boxes, and Liverpool's Liver Building.

In January 2024, Walkers launched three limited edition vegan flavours for Veganuary. BBQ Pork Ribs, Grilled Cheese Toastie and Flame Grilled Steak. In March 2024, Walkers reintroduced their 1990s range of football themed crisps. Salt & Lineker was joined by Chicken Tackle Masala, Steak & Ale Pie-nalty, and Sweet Chilli Kicker. However, Walkers discontinued Worcestershire Sauce flavoured crisps at the same time.

In 2024, Walkers took HM Revenue and Customs (HMRC) to a First-Tier Tax Tribunal, to argue that value-added tax should be removed from their Sensations Poppadom range as it was not a potato crisp. HMRC had applied the tax as the product was made using potato pellets, and the tribunal ruled in favour of HMRC. In 2025, Walkers appealed the decision to the upper tribunal, who upheld the original decision that the product was within the non-exempt category that includes "potato crisps, potato sticks, potato puffs, and similar products made from the potato, or from potato flour, or from potato starch". In January 2026, Walkers changed their logo to a new, "modern sun-inspired" logo.

== Marketing ==
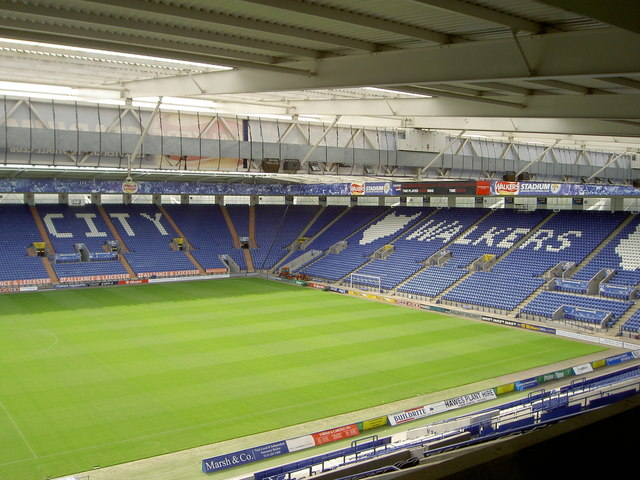
Walkers appeared as the shirt sponsor of Leicester City, the brand's home-town football club, for 14 years. They also sponsored the club's stadium ("Walkers stadium" pictured) from its opening in 2002 to 2011.

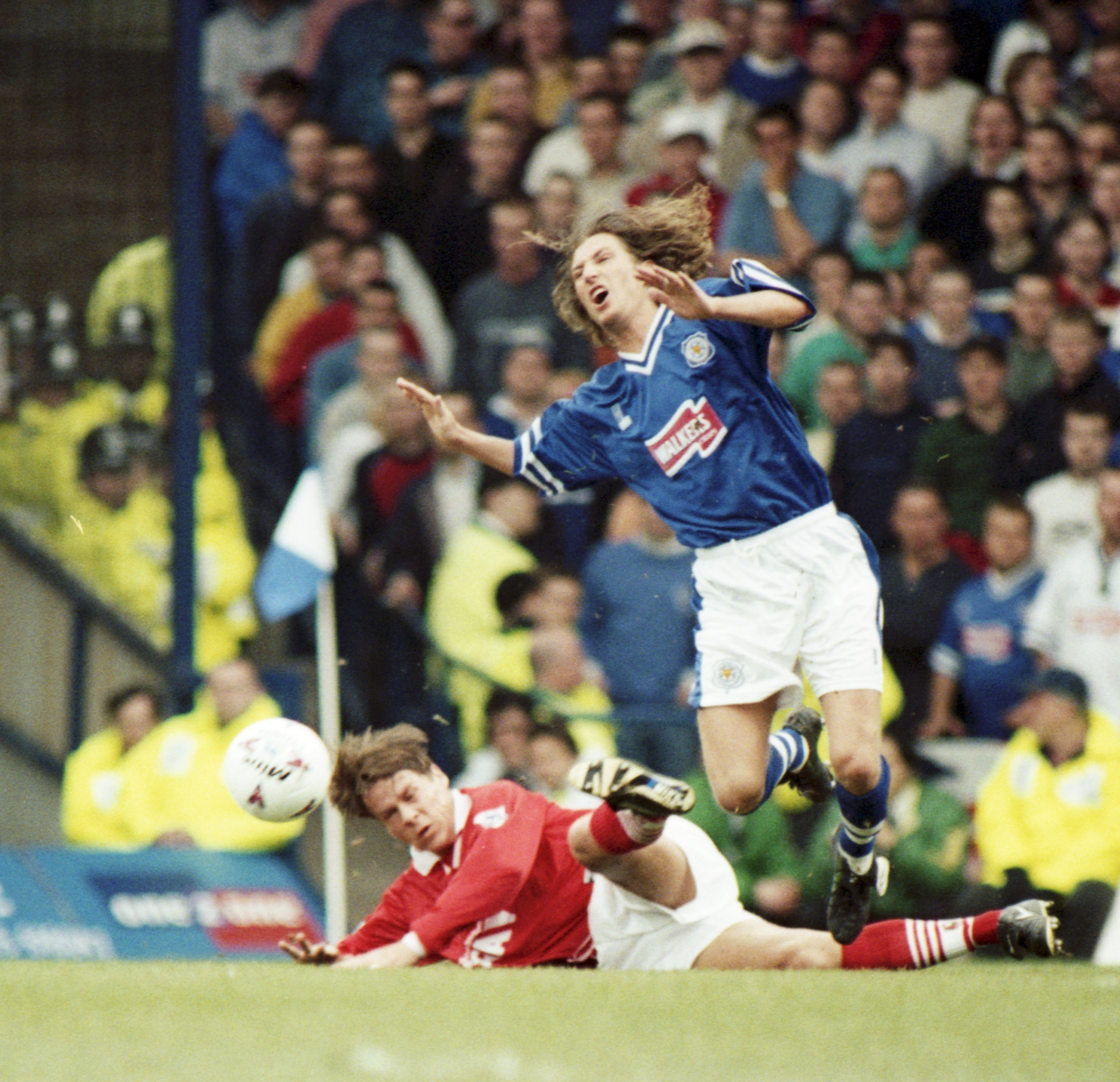
The red ribbon Walkers logo on the front of the Leicester shirt worn by Robbie Savage during the 1997–98 Premier League season

The Walkers logo, featuring a red ribbon around a yellow sun, is noticeably similar to Lay's which is derived from the Walkers logo featuring a red ribbon dating to 1994.

Gary Lineker, the Leicester-born former footballer, has been involved in advertisements with the company since 1995. During the 1990s, Walkers sold limited edition Salt & Lineker and Cheese & Owen crisps featuring the likenesses of Lineker and Michael Owen. In 2000, the British public ranked Lineker's Walkers commercials ninth in Channel 4’s poll of "The 100 Greatest TV Ads".

In September 2001, Walkers ran a "Moneybags" promotion where £20, £10 and £5 notes were placed in special winning bags. However, two workers at a crisp factory were dismissed after stealing cash prizes from bags on the production line. In the run-up to Halloween in 2001, Walkers released Pickled Onion flavour Monster Munch that could turn the consumer's tongue blue, which was promoted in British children's comics such as The Dandy.

In April 2010, the company launched a promotional campaign entitled the Walkers Flavour Cup in order to locate the world's most loved and favourite flavour. In the end, it was decided that the flavour with the most fans at the end of the tournament/competition would be declared the winner and ultimate champion of all flavours. Walkers encouraged people to engage in social media activity, and upload photos and videos to its website proving people's Superfan status of Walkers Crisps. The best fan from each of the 15 flavours won £10,000. In the end, English roast beef & Yorkshire pudding won the Flavour Cup.

For the 2011 Comic Relief, four celebrities (Jimmy Carr, Stephen Fry, Al Murray and Frank Skinner) each represented four new flavours. In 2014, Lineker launched a new "Do Us a Flavour" Walkers competition, allowing the public to submit new flavours of crisps. Six flavours would be chosen and sold for the remainder of the year before a public vote selected a winner, with a prize of £1m. The public had to pick one of Walkers' ingredients as a base – Somerset Cheddar, Devonshire chicken, Norfolk pork, Dorset sour cream, Vale of Evesham tomatoes and Aberdeen Angus beef – and create a new flavour using it.

In 2015, Walkers launched the "Bring me Back" campaign, reintroducing Barbecue, Cheese and Chive, Beef and Onion, Lamb and Mint and Toasted Cheese flavours for a limited time. People voted on the Walkers website or used hashtags to see which flavour would be reintroduced permanently (Beef and Onion was chosen). The Marmite flavour was also brought back permanently to coincide with the promotion.

On 10 April 2016, Walkers launched the Spell and Go promotion, again fronted by Gary Lineker. This competition caused some controversy as customers complained that it was impossible to win. The fairness of the competition was discussed on You and Yours, the consumer show on BBC Radio 4. Over 100 entrants complained to the Advertising Standards Authority, who after completing an investigation, decided that elements were misleading, and the competition was banned.

Walkers' "Great British Dinner" range included baked ham & mustard and chicken tikka. A series of "mystery flavours" were launched in 2012, and later revealed to be sour cream & spring onion, Lincolnshire sausage & brown sauce, and Birmingham chicken balti. In 2016, Walkers produced a limited edition 'Winners - Salt and Victory' crisps to commemorate its home-town football team, Leicester City, winning the Premier League for the first time. Earlier that season, Walkers had given Leicester fans in attendance at a match versus Chelsea bags of "Vardy salted" crisps, bearing the image of the Foxes' striker.

In 2019, Walkers reunited with the Spice Girls, with the 1990s girl band featuring in a campaign. Later that year, American singer Mariah Carey featured in the brand's Christmas advert, reflecting her association with the festive season. In December 2022, Walkers launched a UK-wide search for the best heart-shaped crisp with a £100,000 reward for one winner.

== Products ==
=== Walkers Crisps ===
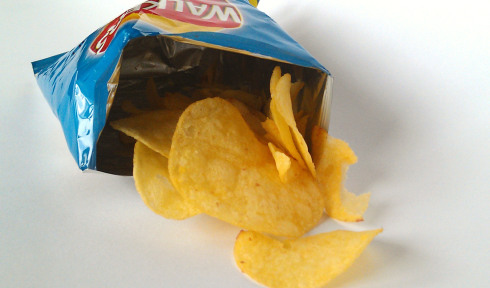
A packet of Walkers Cheese & Onion crisps. They are in a blue wrapper while Walkers Salt & Vinegar are in a green wrapper, the opposite colour scheme for other brands of British crisps.

The main flavours of Walkers Crisps offered by the company currently (as of October 2026) are:

- Ready Salted
- Cheese & Onion
- Salt & Vinegar
- Prawn Cocktail
- Roast Chicken
- Smoky Bacon
- Tomato Ketchup
- Pickled Onion
- BBQ Sauce
- Worcester Sauce
- Masala Chicken
- Sticky Teriyaki
- Hot Honey
- Salt & Shake

Over the years, some flavours have been made available for a short time either because they tied in with special promotions or failed to meet sales expectations.

The unusual colours for Walkers packaging with Salt & Vinegar (in green, with other brands in blue), and Cheese & Onion (in blue, with other brands in green) has been debated in the UK, with some believing Walkers switched the colours; however, Walkers have stated that they have always had that colour scheme. The confusion can be attributed to Walkers' rise to become the most popular brand in the UK (overtaking Golden Wonder, whose colour scheme people had become used to) after their acquisition by PepsiCo in the 1990s.

In 2022, Walkers launched its first non "High Fat, High Salt" (HFHS) range that is labelled 45% less salt.

=== Walkers Baked ===
Walkers Baked is a range of oven-baked, lower fat crisps, launched in 2006. Current flavours are:

- Cheese & Onion
- Sea Salt
- Salt & Vinegar
- Prawn Cocktail
- Cheese & Jalapeno
- Slow Roasted Beef (Launched 2026)

=== Walkers Max ===
Walkers Max is a range of ridged crisps launched in 1999. Current flavours are:

- Extra Flamin' Hot
- Strong Hot Chicken Wings
- Sizzling Flame Grilled Steak
- Chunky Cheese & Onion
- Strong Jalapeno & Cheese
- Zingy Salt & Malt Vinegar
- Punchy Paprika

=== Walkers Sensations ===
Walkers Sensations is a range of crisps launched in 2002. Made in distinguished black coloured bags, it consists of "adult" flavours and aims for the top end market. The brand has since grown to include ‘Poppadom’ crisps mixing potato with gram flour, and flavoured peanuts. Current flavours are:

Crisps

- Balsamic Vinegar & Caramelised Onion
- Thai Sweet Chilli
- Roasted Chicken & Thyme
- Crushed Sea Salt & Black Peppercorn
- Mature Cheddar & Chilli Chutney

Poppadoms

- Lime & Coriander Chutney
- Mango & Red Chilli Chutney

Nuts

- Thai Sweet Chilli Nuts
- Californian Honey & Salt Nuts
- Mexican Smoked Chilli Nuts

=== Other Walkers snacks ===
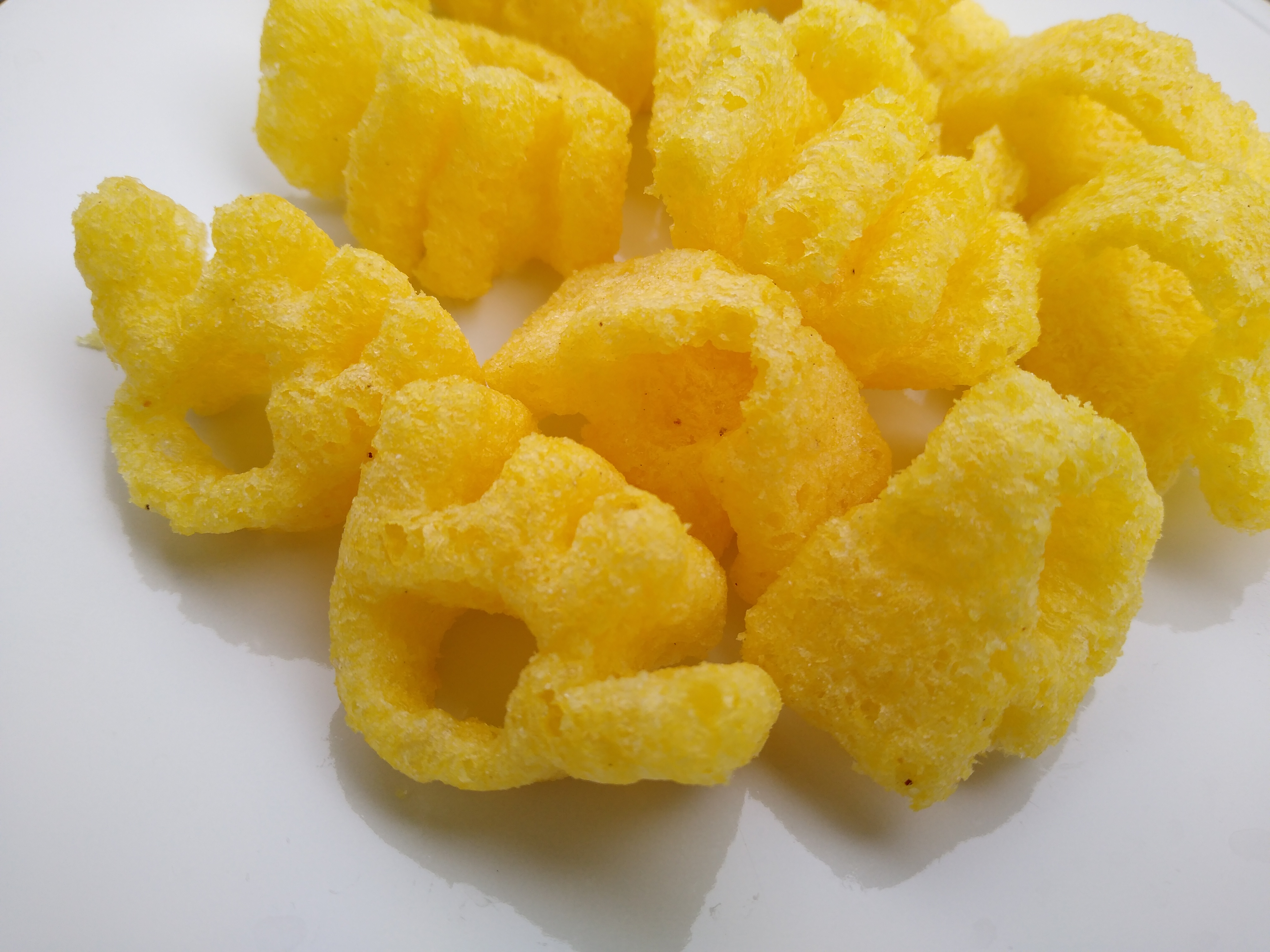
Monster Munch pickled onion flavour

Other Walkers branded products are:

- Bugles (launched in 2016)
- Crinkles (launched in 2011)
- French Fries
- Max Double Crunch (launched in 2020)
- Monster Munch
- Quavers
- Squares (rebranded from Smith's Squares to Walkers in 2001)
- Sunbites (launched in 2007)
- That's Nuts (launched in 2025)
- Wotsits (purchased from Golden Wonder in 2002)

=== Non-Walkers branded lines ===
- Doritos
- Snack-A-Jacks
- Sunbites

=== Smith's branded products ===
These products are sold under the Smith's brand name:

- Chipsticks – Extruded corn starch snack in the shape of a french fry, in a salt and vinegar flavour.
- Frazzles – Extruded corn starch snack in the shape of a bacon rasher, in a bacon flavour.
- Bacon Fries – Extruded cereal starch snack, in a bacon flavour.
- Scampi Fries – Extruded cereal starch snack, in a scampi flavour.
- Smith's Crisps - Potato crisps in ready salted, salt and vinegar or cheese and onion flavoured 5-pack multipacks.

=== Former ranges ===
- Baked Hoops and Crosses (launched in 2013)
- Baked Stars (launched in 2012)
- Bitza Pizza
- Cheese Heads (launched in 2006; discontinued in 2008)
- Deep Ridged (launched in 2012; discontinued in 2015)
- Double Crunch
- Extra Crunchy (launched in 2010)
- Lites / Lights
- Market Deli (launched in 2014)
- Mighty Lights (launched in 2013)
- Mixups
- Looney Toons
- Oven Baked Crispy Crackers
- Poppadum Style Crisps
- Pops (launched in 2014)
- Potato Heads (launched in 2005; discontinued in 2008)
- Sensations Streetmix (discontinued in 2024)
- Snaps (rebranded under Smith's)
- Stax (discontinued in 2021)
- Sundog Savoury Popcorn (launched in 1999; discontinued in 2000)
- Tear 'n' Share (launched in 2016; discontinued in 2019)
- Wotsits Giants
- Wotsits Wafflers

== Popularity ==
Walkers Snack Foods is the largest seller of savoury snacks in Britain with a market share of 17.3 percent in 2024. According to The Grocer, Walkers is Britain's third biggest grocery brand in 2022 with total sales amounting to £1.25 billion.

In 2002–2003, Walkers crisps was the single "best-selling brand" in the country in all sectors, in terms of sales value. By comparison, Persil main wash placed second, Diet Coke third, Hovis pre-packaged bread fourth, and Andrex toilet tissue fifth.

The company's Walkers Crisps have been the most popular crisp product among Brits for a long time. Of each flavour, as of 2010, Cheese & Onion is the brand's most popular choice, followed by Ready Salted, Salt & Vinegar, Prawn Cocktail, and other flavours following that. In 2019, Walkers's Cheese & Onion was the single most popular crisp product in the country, according to a YouGov survey. Ready Salted placed third (with another Walkers Snacks Foods product, Quavers, taking second spot) and Salt & Vinegar placing sixth. In a separate survey by Perspectus Global in 2024, which also found Walkers Cheese & Onion to be number one among British crisp consumers, Walkers Salt & Vinegar placed third in the survey, Walkers Ready Salted fifth, and Walkers Prawn Cocktail fifteenth. Among the company's other brands, Beef flavour Monster Munch was the second most popular in the survey, meaning that Walkers Snack Foods held four of the top five most popular British crisps, the odd one out being Pringles Original. Walkers themselves also claim that Cheese & Onion is their most popular flavour for the original Walkers Crisps range.

The popularity of Walkers's own-brand crisps also differs by generation, according to a YouGov survey in 2014. The Prawn Cocktail flavour was incrementally more popular among younger people. It was the single most favoured in the 18 to 24 year old demographic, although this age range also had the widest variety. The 25–39 demographic favoured Salt & Vinegar the most, while the 40–59 demographic favoured Cheese & Onion the most. The oldest demographic with an age of 60+ (i.e. mainly consumers born in the first half of the 20th century) had a significant preference for Ready Salted, with 49% preferring this flavour over others.

== Litter ==
According to the environmental charity Keep Britain Tidy, Walkers crisps packets along with Cadbury chocolate wrappers and Coca-Cola cans were the three top brands that were the most common pieces of rubbish found in UK streets in 2013. In December 2018, Walkers launched a recycling scheme for crisp packets after it was targeted by protests on the issue. Three months after its launch more than half a million empty packets were recycled. However, as UK consumers eat 6 billion packets of crisps per year, with Walkers producing 11 million packets per day, the campaign organisation 38 Degrees noted this represents only a small fraction of the number of packets made and sold annually.

== See also ==
- List of brand name snack foods
