= Elmer Chocolate =

American candy manufacturer

Elmer Candy Corporation
- Company type: Private
- Industry: Manufacturing
- Founded: 1855
- Headquarters: Ponchatoula, Louisiana
- Key people: Robert Nelson, President
- Products: Confectionery
- Number of employees: 164 in 2014
- Website: Elmer Chocolate

Elmer Candy Corporation is a confectionery company that was founded in 1855 as the Miller Candy Company in New Orleans, Louisiana. The company sells seasonal holiday candies and, in 2014, was the second-largest manufacturer of Valentine boxed chocolate in North America. The company was purchased by a private Florida based firm to become part of the Hoffmann Family of Companies.

== History ==
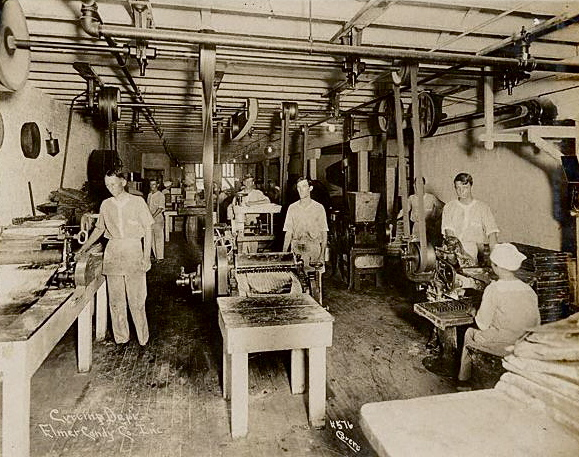
The Elmer Candy factory in New Orleans about 1917

In 1855, a German immigrant, Christopher Henry Miller, started the Miller Candy Company in New Orleans. When Augustus Elmer married Miller's daughter, the company name was changed in the early 1900s to Miller-Elmer Candy Corporation. Elmer's five sons joined the business and, around 1914, the company became Elmer Candy Corporation.

In 1936, the Elmer brothers came up with a new cornmeal based cheese curl. A product naming contest was held in New Orleans, and the winning name entry was CheeWees. In 1946, a new company, Elmer's Fine Foods, was formed to market their new cheese curl product, but the brothers continued operating Elmer Candy Corporation for their chocolate business.

In 1963, Roy Nelson, a native of Chicago, bought Elmer Candy Corporation, including the trademark name, CheeWees, from the descendants of Augustus Elmer. The Elmer family retained control over Elmer's Fine Foods and continued to sell their cheese curls under various names.

In 1993, Elmer's Fine Foods repurchased the trademark name CheeWees from Elmer Candy Corporation.

Roy Nelson recruited his son, Allan, to help manage Elmer Candy Corporation. In 1970, due to antiquated facilities in New Orleans, the Nelsons moved their company about 60 miles (97 km) northwest, to Ponchatoula, Louisiana. In order to stay competitive with larger chocolate companies, the Nelsons concentrated on production of seasonal holiday chocolates (Valentine, Easter, and Christmas) for regional consumption.

By 2004, Robert Nelson, Allan's son, was president of Elmer Candy Corporation.

In 2025, a family equity firm (Hoffmann Family of Companies) acquired a majority ownership of Elmer's Candy Company. The Hoffmann Family of Companies is headquartered in Winnetka, Illinois. Under terms of the acquisition, the Nelson family retained partial ownership of the company and would remain in leadership positions at Elmer's Chocolate. The current product line was expected to remain stable, but future plans would shift from seasonal offerings to "year-round" availability.

== Products ==
- Heavenly Hash Egg consists of a marshmallow center that contains two roasted almonds and has an outer coating of milk chocolate. In 1923, Elmer's acquired the recipe for Heavenly Hash from a New Orleans department store. Besides the original version, Elmer's also produces a strawberry marshmallow Heavenly Hash, and a dark chocolate version of the original.
- Gold Brick Egg, first introduced in 1936, is a milk chocolate bar with chopped pecans. Two other versions include dark chocolate, and milk chocolate with bits of malted milk.
- Pecan Egg consists of a nougat center, covered in caramel and chopped pecans.
- Boxed chocolates include five flavors: caramel in a milk chocolate shell, strawberry creme covered in milk chocolate, raspberry chocolate truffle in a dark chocolate shell, chocolate fudge covered in milk chocolate, and orange creme in a dark chocolate shell.
- Gold Brick topping is a milk chocolate sauce with bits of pecan. It is the only company product available throughout the year.

== Gallery ==
Heavenly Hash wrap

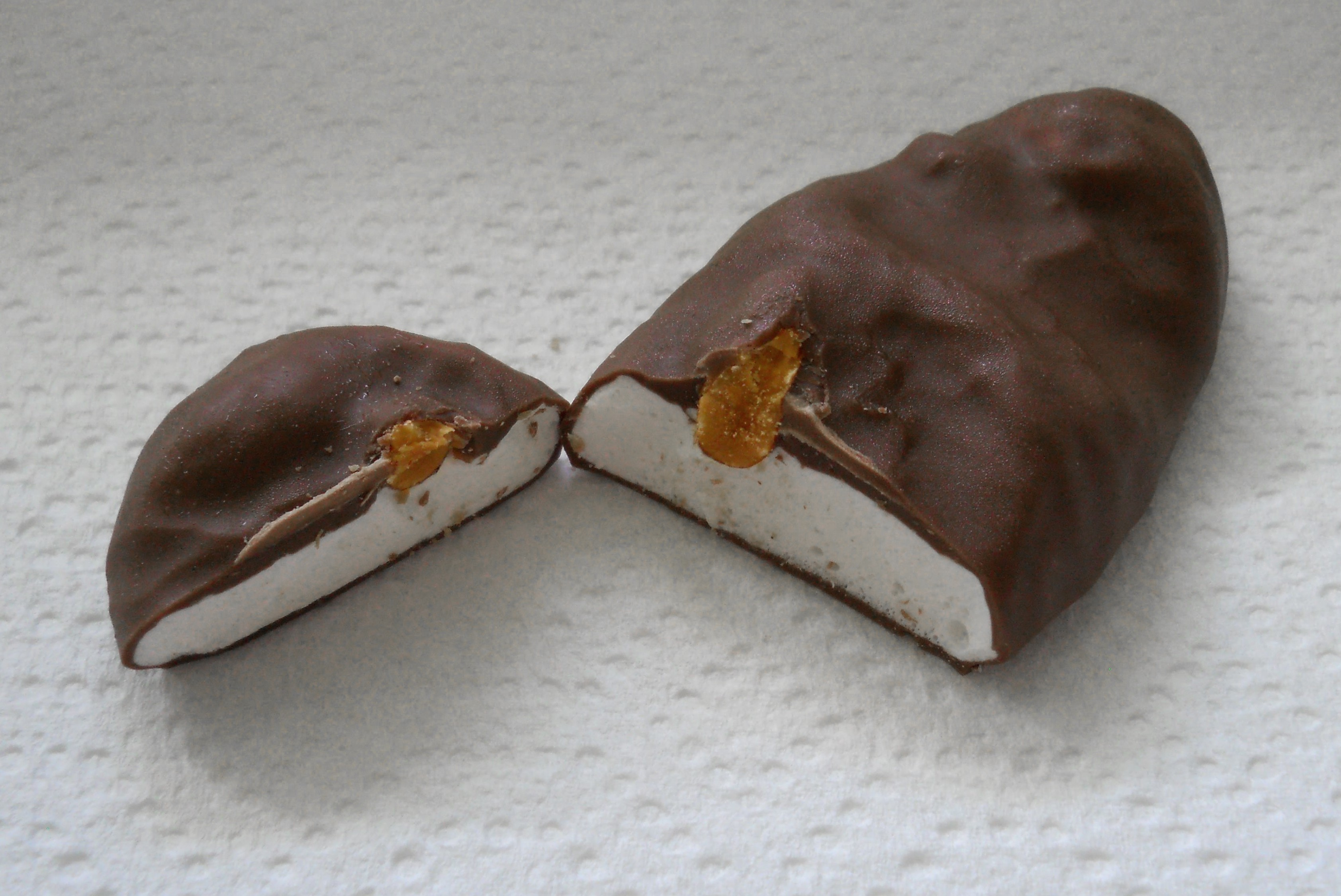
Heavenly Hash egg

Gold Brick wrap

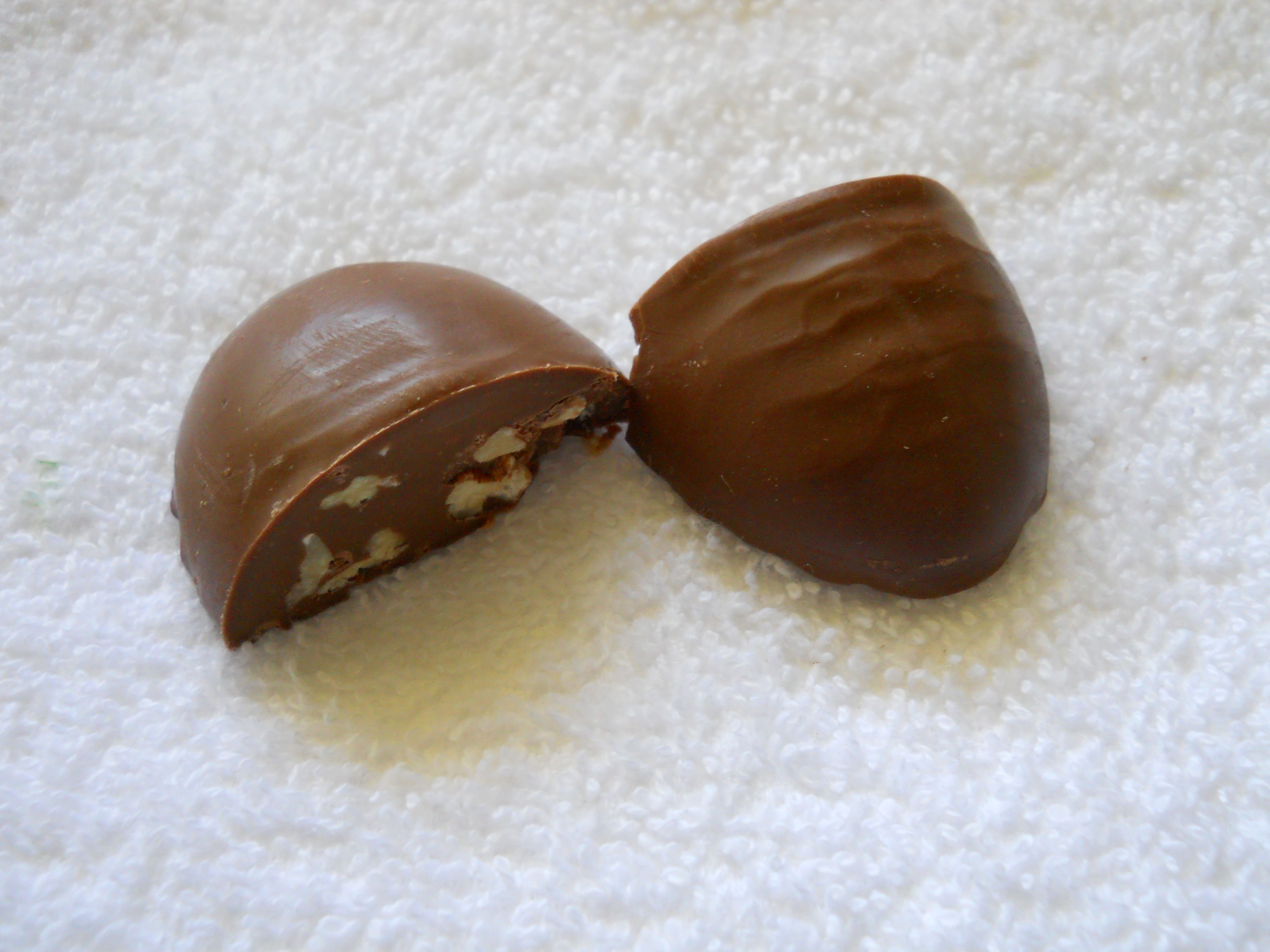
Gold Brick egg

Dark Chocolate Gold Brick wrap

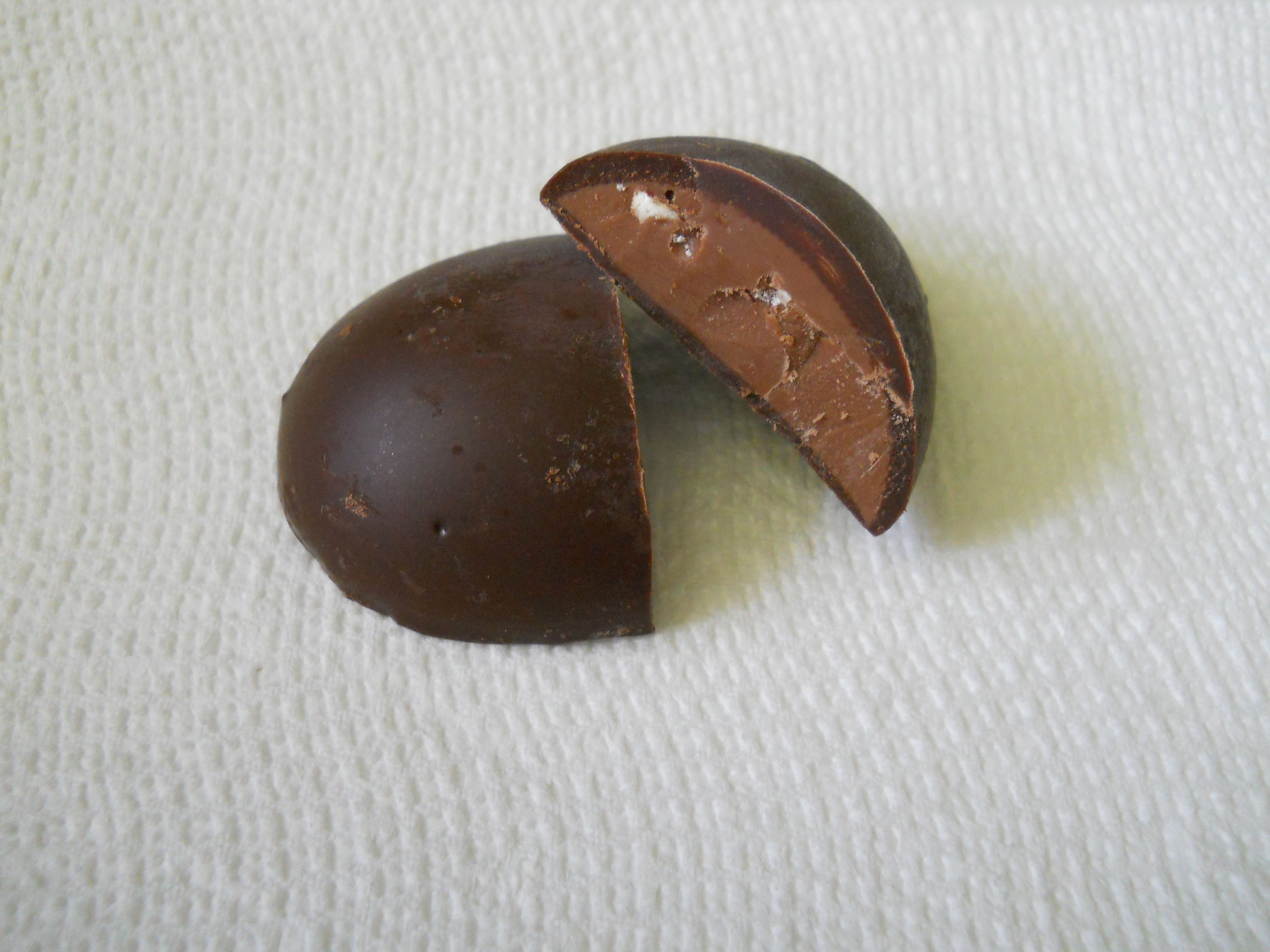
Dark Chocolate Gold Brick egg

Pecan Egg wrap

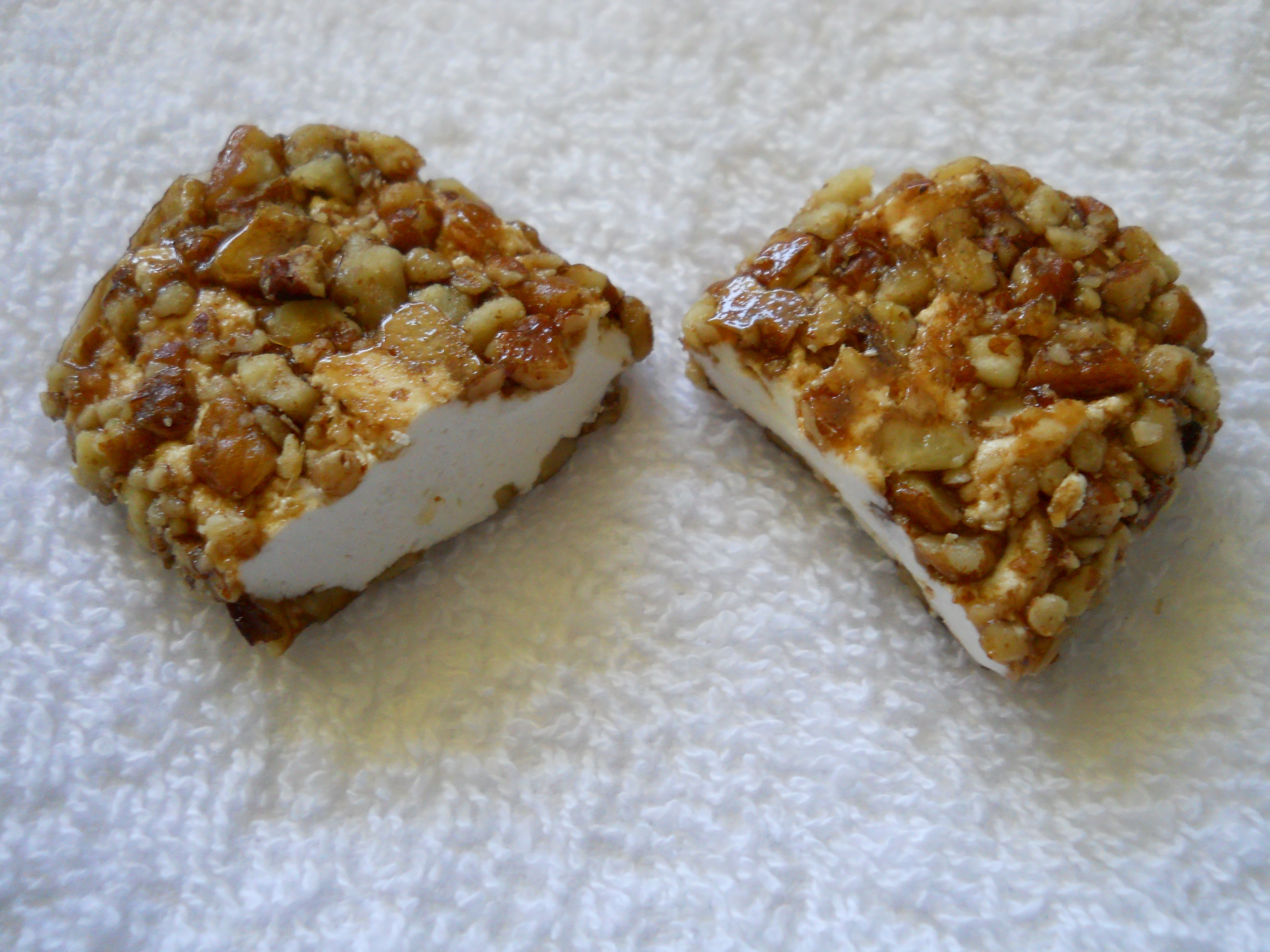
Pecan Egg

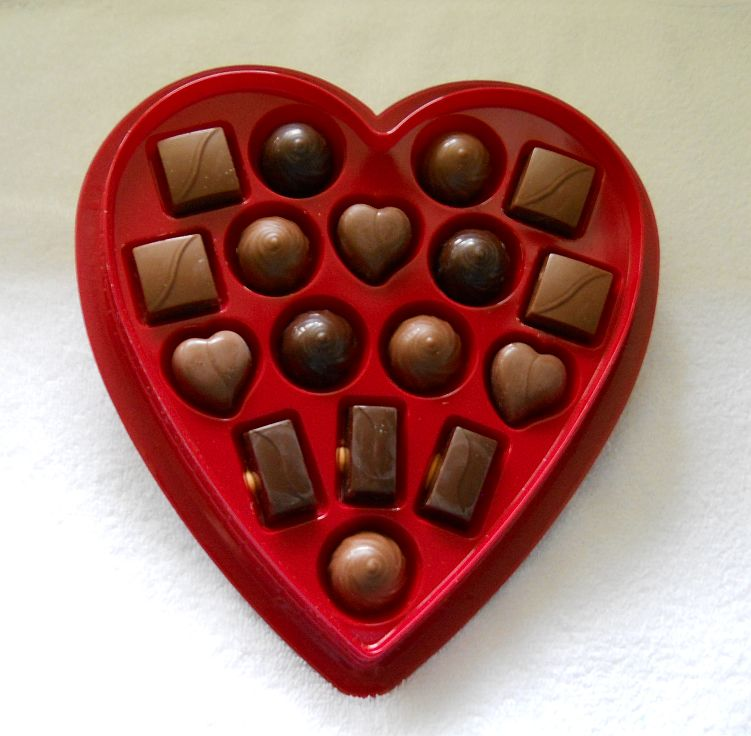
Valentine boxed chocolates

== See also ==
- List of chocolate bar brands
