= Wotsits =

British snack food

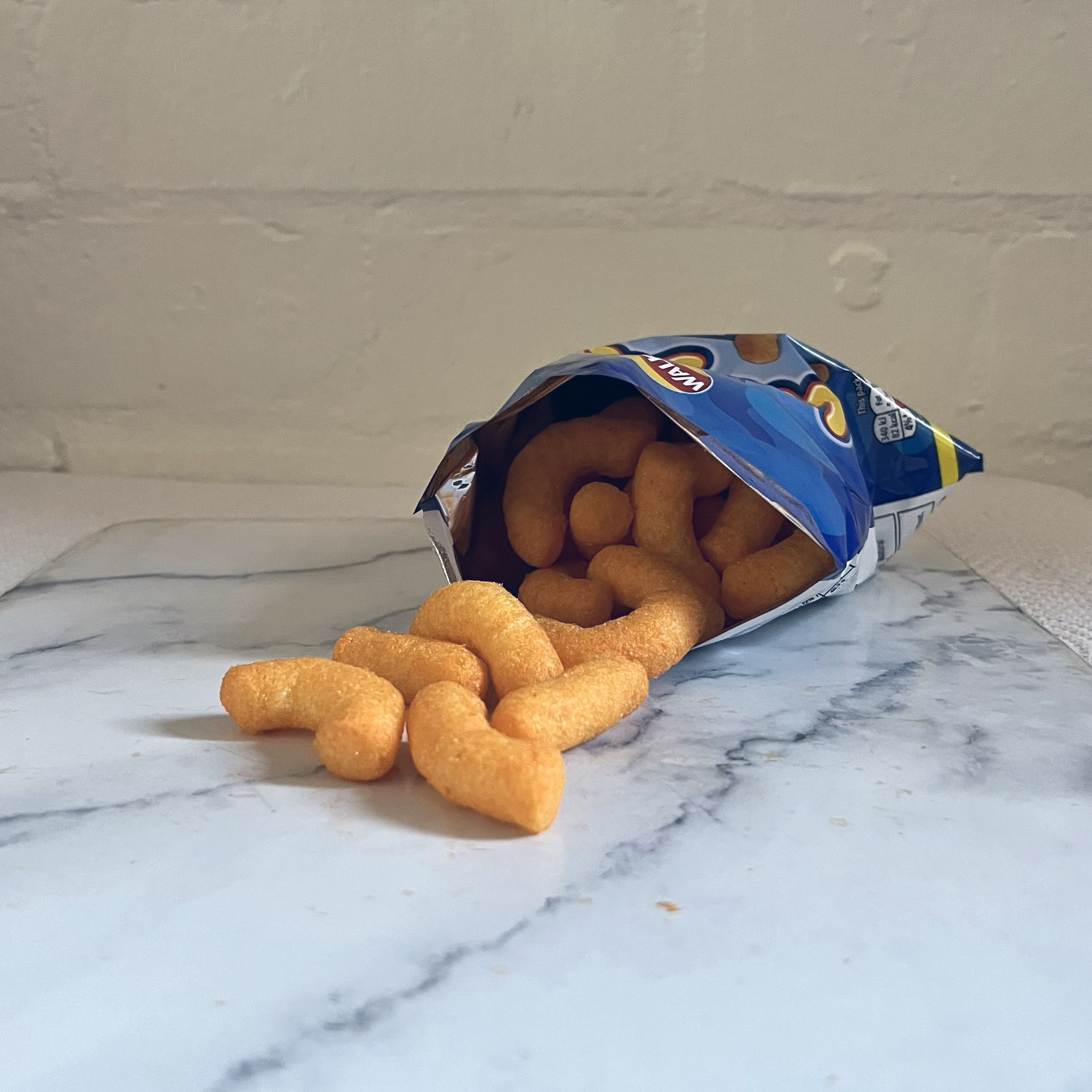
- Really Cheesy Flavour Wotsits
- Product type: Cheese puffs
- Current owner: Walkers
- Country: United Kingdom
- Introduced: 1971; 55 years ago
- Markets: United Kingdom; Ireland
- Previous owners: Golden Wonder

Wotsits is a British brand of cheese-flavoured baked corn puffs produced by Walkers. Originally launched by Golden Wonder in 1971, which sold the brand to Walkers in 2002, the snack is primarily known for its cheese variant ("Really Cheesy"), although other flavours have been introduced over the years. They are known for their light, airy texture and orange hue, and are well known in Britain.

== Name ==
When Walkers purchased Wotsits, early plans were put in place in October 2002 to rebrand Wotsits under the Cheetos name (owned by their parent company PepsiCo). Walkers previously released the Cheetos brand in Britain, but with little success. However, nothing came to be of this planned change and Walkers kept the Wotsits brand as is with a new look, replacing Cheetos. Wotsits relaunched with a brand new look and advertising campaign on 3 January 2003, and the main cheese flavour was named Really Cheesy.

== Varieties and flavours ==
As of September 2025, the Wotsits range consists of:

| Flavour | Type | | |
| Flavour | Original | Giants | Crunchy |
|---|---|---|---|
| Cheese | Yes | Yes | Yes |
| Sweet & Spicy Flamin' Hot | Yes | Yes | Yes |
| Cheese Toastie | Yes | | |
| Crispy Bacon | Yes | | |
| Prawn Cocktail | Yes | Yes | |
| Flamin' Hot | | Yes | |
| Extra Flamin' Hot | | | Yes |

=== Golden Wonder ownership ===
When first introduced by Golden Wonder, Wotsits were available in flavours such as Cheesy, Crispy Beef (later named Barbecue Beef and BBQ Beef), Cheese & Bacon, and Spicy Tomato. The latter two were discontinued in 1993. A Prawn Cocktail flavour was released in February 1998.

In the late 1990s, Golden Wonder introduced various brand expansions of the product. The first brand extension was "Long Wotsits" in February 1995, which featured longer strands of corn. The second brand extension was "Weenie Wotsits" in November 1999, which was a smaller version of the snack. This was followed up with the launch of the grid-shaped "Wotsits Wafflers" in May 2000 and the oven-based "Wotsits Mealtime Potato Shapes" in November 2000.

In August 2001, "Whopping Wotsits" were introduced, which were larger versions of the regular variety. The Mealtime Potato Shapes were later released at McDonald's restaurants across the country, and were later expanded to Wotsits Wafflers as well. In November, "Wotsits Micro Snacks" were introduced, which were microwaveable versions of the snack.

In March 2002, Golden Wonder announced the launch of a football-shaped version of the product called "Wotsits Goalden Balls" to coincide with the 2002 FIFA World Cup. The product was released to compete with Walkers' "Footballs" product. In April 2002, Golden Wonder teamed up with British television duo Ant & Dec for the "Goalden Shootout" promotion. Numbered codes of the back were shown in special packs of Nik Naks, Wotsits, Wotsits Wafflers, and Wotsits Goalden Balls.

=== Walkers ownership ===
A "Mild Cheese" flavour was added to the range in 2003 after the takeover of Wotsits by Walkers.

On 1 April 2004, Walkers announced the launch of a new "Flamin' Hot" flavour of the product, replacing "BBQ Beef", and was promoted as such as a "HOT NEW FLAVOUR!" On 26 July 2004, Walkers announced the launch of a new product expansion called "Wotsits Twisted", which contained twists of corn, and were available in BBQ and Really Cheesy flavours. From February 2007, Wotsits (along with Walkers's Quavers, Squares, French Fries and Monster Munch) started being made with sunseed oil instead, decreasing saturated fat.

In August 2012, Wotsits Wafflers were reintroduced, being available in Bacon flavour. In May 2013, it was reintroduced as simply "Wafflers" under the Smiths brand, alongside the relaunch of Wotsits Twisted, branded solely as "Twisted".

A limited-edition version Zombie Fingers was put on sale for Halloween in September 2013 and has returned at following Halloweens. These come in Flamin' Hot flavour and are longer and curlier than normal Wotsits.

On 9 January 2020, Walkers announced that the Flamin' Hot and BBQ Beef (renamed to "Sizzlin' Steak") would return to store shelves due to popular demand. A new variety called "Wotsits Giants" was also introduced around the same time, containing larger pieces of corn double the size of standard Wotsits, and are sold in Really Cheesy and Flamin' Hot.

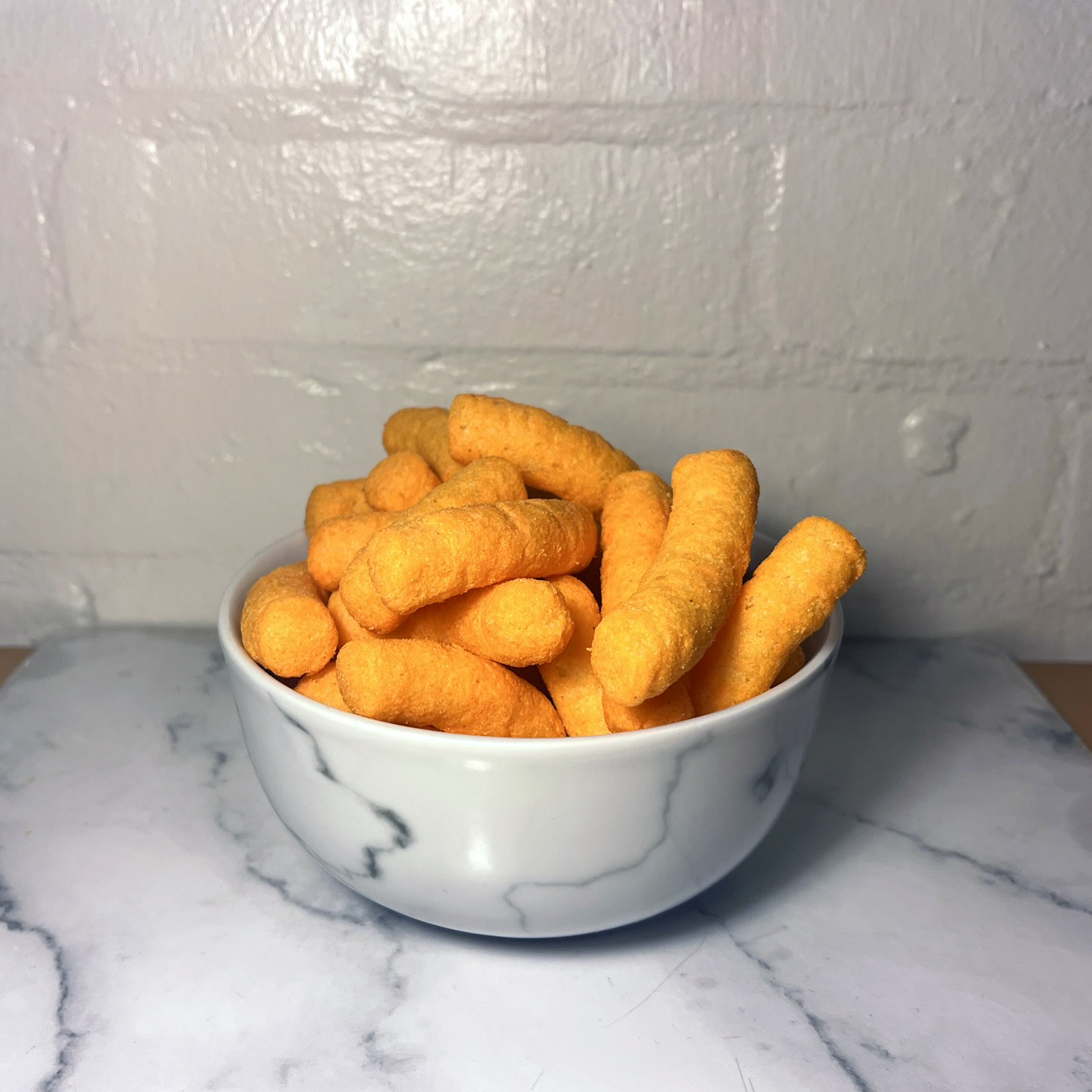
A bowl of the "Wotsits Giants" variety.

On 18 February 2022, it was announced that the Prawn Cocktail flavour would return to store shelves as a Wotsits Giants flavour in March, once again due to popular demand. At the same time, it was announced that Crunchy Wotsits would be introduced, in Really Cheesy and Flamin' Hot flavours.

In June 2023, a "Wotsits Really Cheesy" flavour of Walkers Crisps was released for a limited time only.

In March 2024, the Flamin' Hot flavour for all Wotsits varieties was renamed to "Sweet and Spicy Flamin' Hot" to avoid confusion with Walkers' "Extra Flamin' Hot" brand, of which a new Wotsits Crunchy flavour was released for the range. On 1 July, Walkers announced the "Yummy With" range of lower-salt snacks made with chickpea flour. Two new Wotsits flavours - Crispy Bacon, and Cheese Toastie, are part of this range.

== Advertising ==
The brand was the first to introduce inserts into its packs in March 1996, with the insertion of "Pogs". The brand was previously advertised with the strapline "you only get a whoosh with a Wotsit" from at least 1992. In September 2001, Golden Wonder ran a "Footie Flikka" promotion, which included twenty Footie Flikkas and a Footie Flikka album.

Wotsits were one of the sponsors of SMTV Live (alongside other Walkers snacks such as Monster Munch and Squares) from 4 January 2003 until the show's discontinuation on 27 December 2003.

In 2003, the advertising agency Abbott Mead Vickers made a public apology when the Parliamentary Select Committee on Health brought to light a private brief that it had made to Frito-Lay (Walkers' owners) where it proposed encouraging children (4 to 9 years old) to believe that "Wotsits are for me—I'm going to buy them when I get the chance and pester Mum for them when she next goes shopping".

In December 2009, Quavers, Wotsits, Squares, and French Fries all changed their packaging again to coincide with a "99 Calories or Less" range with a consumers' focus on "New Year New Me".
