= Puffcorn =

Puffed or extruded corn snacks

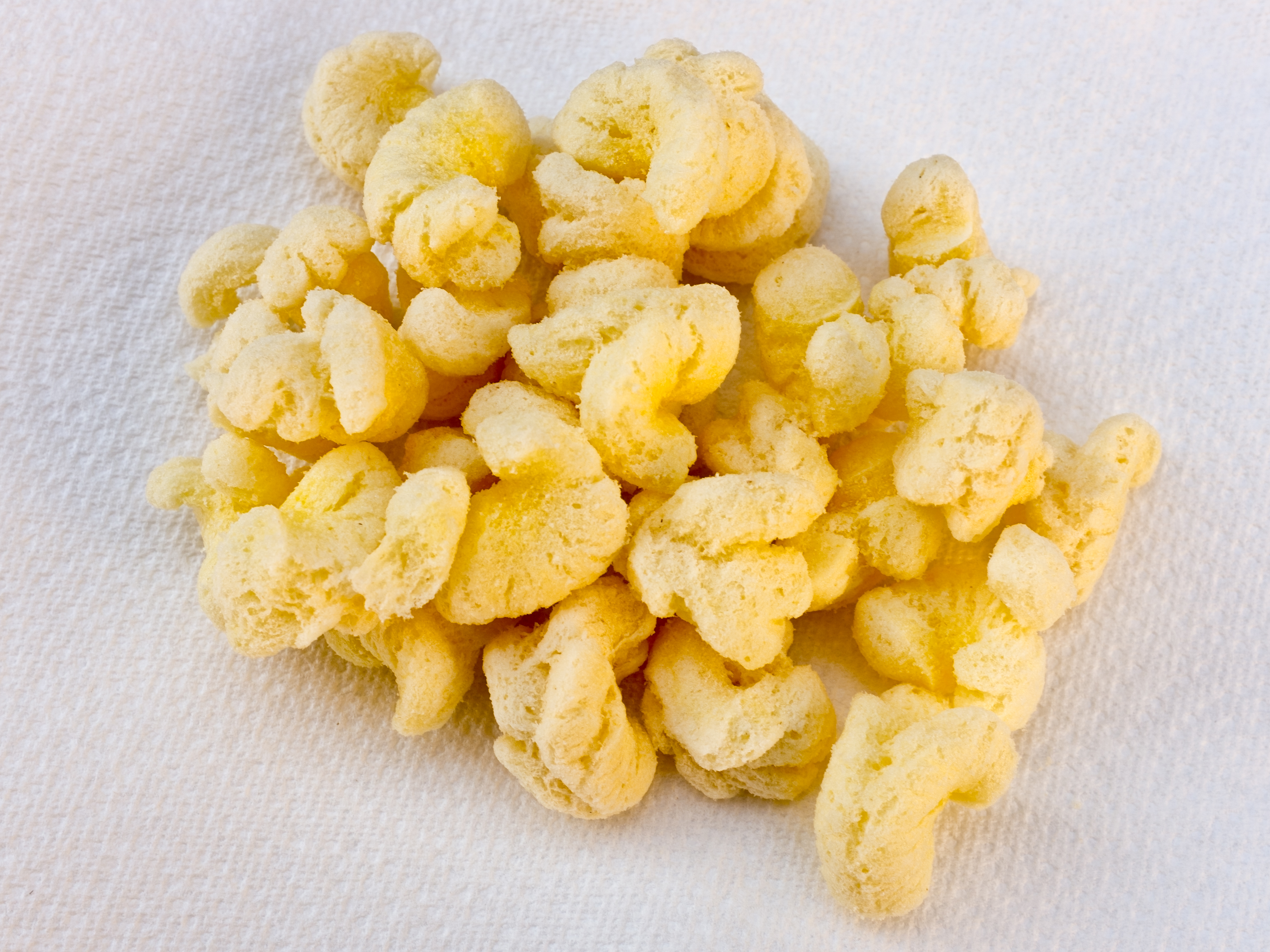
- Puffcorn
- Type: Snack food
- Place of origin: United States
- Main ingredients: Cornmeal, flavoring

Puffcorn or corn puffs are puffed or extruded corn snacks made with corn meal, which can be baked or fried.

Puffcorn belongs in the snack group products made with corn grits, rice, wheat, or other cereals. Puffcorn is often flavoured with cheese, caramel, oil, chili, onion, or garlic powder, and many other spices. Types of puffcorn can vary in length, density, hardness, springiness, gumminess, chewiness, and level of redness and yellowness, especially when using different percentages of oat flour. Some products sold as puffcorn are given the appearance of popcorn, although they are not made from whole grains as popcorn is.

Puffcorn is commonly known as a ready‐to‐eat functional breakfast cereal or an extruded functional snack. Some puffcorn is made with oat flour, flaxseed and chia corn. Due to the health benefits, there has been increased interest in developing functional food products containing chia. Extrusion has been shown to be an effective method for incorporating other functional ingredients into food products.

Manufacturers include Frito-Lay and Old Dutch Foods.

Sweetened (Corn Pops, Reese's Puffs, etc.) and salty/seasoned (Kurkure, various cheese puffs, etc.) varieties also exist.

== Manufacturing process ==
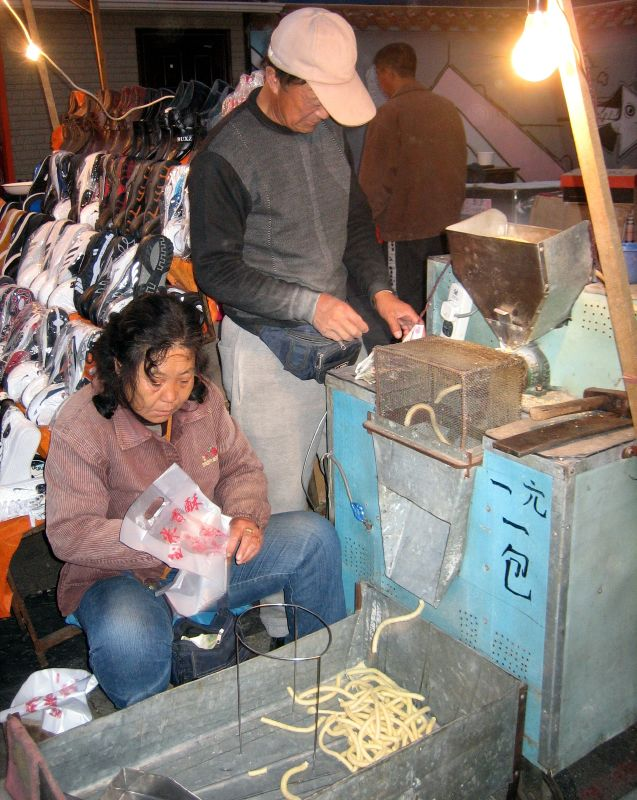
A puffcorn extruder producing street food in Shenyang, China

Puffcorn, much like other puffed products such as cereals and crispbreads are processed by extrusion cooking through an extruder. This is a thermodynamic process where the dough is passed through a tube and heated under a certain amount of pressure. The puffcorn dough product is then forced through a narrow opening called a die, and as it gets released, the change in pressure and temperature causes the product to puff out, giving the texture and consistency of puffcorn. The different shapes and textures of puffcorn are manipulated by the die at the end of the extruder and the type of extruder used. Specific types of grain size of the starch required during processing also depends on the snack type itself; for example, if the puffcorn snack requires a fine structure with small pores, an extruder with smaller granulation should be used, whereas crispier puffcorn would require larger granulation.

== Packaging ==
Factors that are considered to determine the packaging material of extruded snacks like puffcorn are water vapour transmission rate (WVTR), oxygen transmission rate (OTR), optical density (OD), and flavour/odor barrier property. The packaging of choice ultimately compromises between protective properties, the shelf life of the product, aesthetic appeal, and cost. Given that deterioration of puffcorn products is primarily attributed to loss of crispness, it is crucial that the packaging provides a barrier against water vapour. Oxygen barrier requirements for the packaging of puffcorn may be less stringent as extruded and puffed snacks can be less sensitive to oxygen in comparison with fried snack foods. A variety of materials can be used in packaging of puffcorn, examples of which include low-density polyethylene (LDPE), laminated pouches (LP), and biaxially-oriented polypropylene (OPP). In an investigation, extruded snacks were found to be more stable in LP in comparison to LDPE.

== Properties ==
=== Chemical and physical properties ===
Starch, the main constituent of puffcorn, is accountable for the snack's structural properties, and thus expires in 3–4 months. During the extrusion process, starch molecules (amylose) are destroyed partially while new crystalline ones are made. They form an amylose-lipid complex affecting puffcorn's structure, texture and other functional properties. Due to the moist heat, the extrusion process may also cause starch gelatinization, protein denaturation, destruction of microorganisms and inactivation of anti-nutrients. Compared to wheat, using corn results in a softer and more expanded product due to its lower protein content and higher starch content (extruded wheat products are harder and don't expand as much).

=== Sensory properties ===
The quality and overall acceptability of puffcorn, as determined by consumers, is based on characteristics pertaining to their appearance, texture, and flavour (determined via sensory evaluation methods). Desired sensory attributes are attained by controlling the composition of the raw material and the processing conditions during extrusion.

=== Appearance ===
Characteristics of puffcorn, notably diameter, porosity, and homogeneous structure, are appearance attributes that aid in the perception of quality of the extruded product. The appearance of these products are enhanced as extrusion feed rate is increased, while increases in extrusion temperature and feed moisture content diminish it. Colour changes during extrusion occur due to product expansion, the decomposition of ingredient pigments, or chemical reactions.

=== Texture and flavour ===
Textural attributes of these extrudates are often associated with their mechanical behaviour, and are related to their appearance and flavour properties. Crispness and melting of extrudates are influenced by extrusion temperature. Higher extrusion temperatures enhance the crispness and melting of extrudates. Feed moisture content decreases the crunchiness and crispness while increasing hardness (density) of the product. Hardness increases the perceived mealy flavour, and is negatively correlated with crispness, melting and burnt flavouring.

== See also ==
- Cheese puffs
- Puffed rice
