= Cheese puffs =

Puffed corn snack

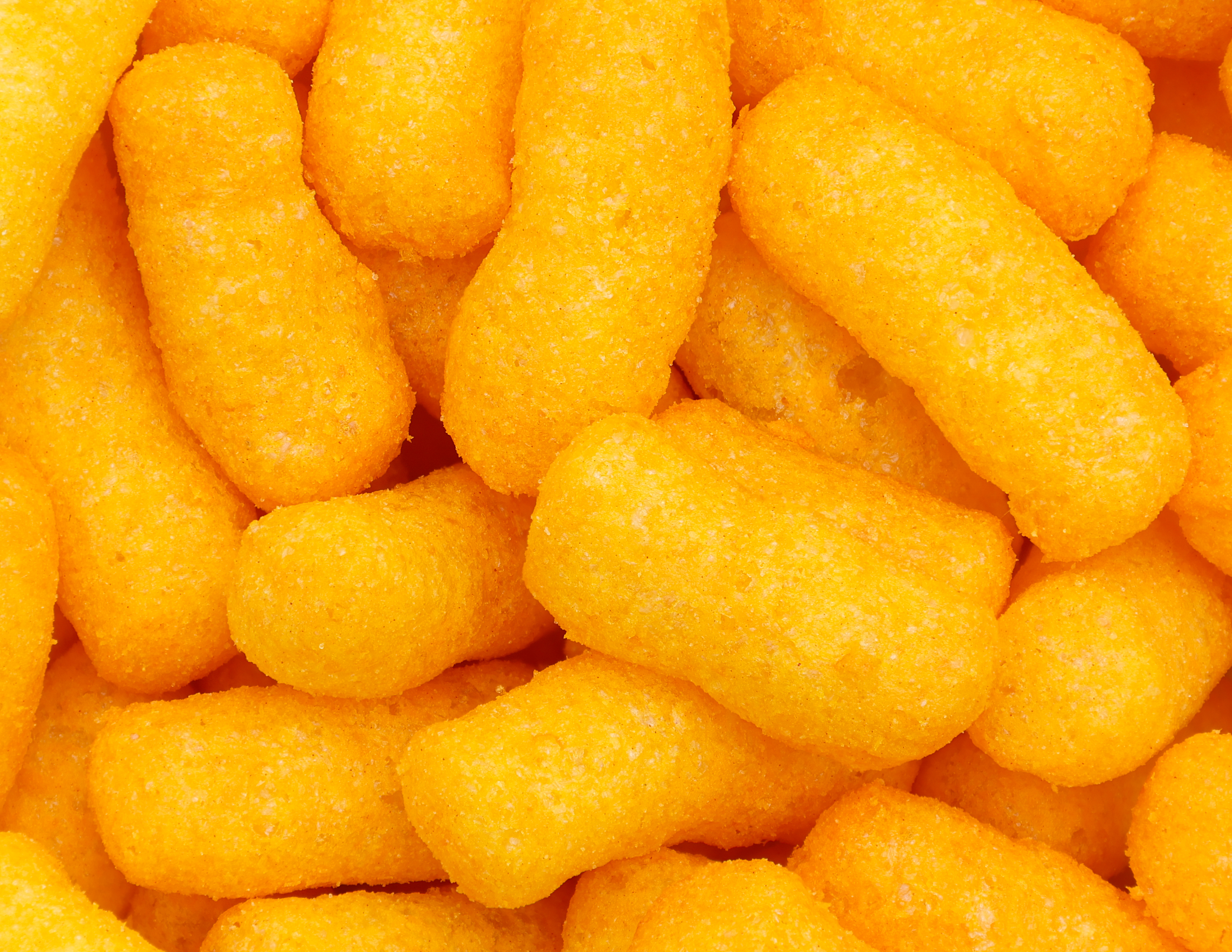
- Alternative names: Cheese curls, cheese balls, cheesy puffs, corn curls, corn cheese
- Type: Snack
- Place of origin: United States
- Main ingredients: Puffed corn, cheese flavoring

Cheese puffs, cheese curls, cheese balls, cheese ball puffs, cheesy puffs, or corn curls are a puffed corn snack, coated with a mixture of cheese or cheese-flavored powders. They are manufactured by extruding heated corn dough through a die that forms the particular shape. They may be ball-shaped, curly ("cheese curls"), straight, or irregularly shaped. Puffcorn is a similar food, without cheese flavoring.

== History ==
Cheese puffs were invented independently by two companies in the United States during the 1930s. According to one account, Edward Wilson noticed strings of puffed corn oozing from flaking machines in the mid 1930s at the Flakall Corporation of Beloit, Wisconsin, a producer of flaked, partially cooked animal feed. He experimented and developed it into a snack. Clarence J. Schwebke applied for an improved extruder patent in 1939 and the product, named Korn Kurls, was commercialized in 1946 by the Adams Corporation, formed by one of the founders of Flakall and his sons. Adams was later bought by Beatrice Foods.

Another version was created by the Elmer Candy Corporation of New Orleans, Louisiana in 1936. The sales manager Morel M. Elmer Sr. held a contest to name the new product "CheeWees". The trademark was lost when the candy company was sold in 1963, but the family's Elmer's Fine Foods continued to make the snack and repurchased the name in 1993.

== Notable brands ==
Common brands of cheese puffs
Brand	Manufacturer	Original country	Year
Cheetos	Frito-Lay	U.S.	1948
Cheez Doodles	Wise Foods	U.S. (Northeastern)	1958
Cheezies	W.T. Hawkins Ltd	Canada	1948
Curl	Meiji	Japan	1968
Kurkure	Pepsico India	India	1999
NikNaks	Simba Chips	South Africa	1972
Pirate's Booty	B&G Foods	U.S.	1987
Twisties	The Smith's Snackfood Company	Australia	1950
Wotsits	Walkers	United Kingdom	1970

== In popular culture ==
A fictitious brand of cheese puffs called "Cheesy Poofs" has appeared periodically in the animated sitcom South Park. The Frito-Lay company produced a limited, promotional run of the snack in August 2011.

== See also ==
- Puffed grain
