= Snackmasters (Australian TV series) =

Australian cooking competition TV series

- Genre: Reality television
- Presented by: Scott Pickett; Poh Ling Yeow; Yvie Jones
- Country of origin: Australia
- Original language: English
- No. of seasons: 2
- No. of episodes: 10

Production
- Running time: 70-100 minutes
- Production company: Warner Bros. International Television Production

Original release
- Network: Nine Network
- Release: 29 November 2021 – 19 December 2022

Snackmasters was an Australian cooking competition television show based on the BAFTA-nominated British series of the same name. Broadcast by the Nine Network, it was hosted by Scott Pickett and Poh Ling Yeow, with Yvie Jones as a co-presenter.

In September 2021, it was announced that Nine had commissioned a local version of the series set to air in the fourth quarter of 2021. The series was originally intended to premiere on 22 November 2021, however the series ultimately premiered on 29 November 2021. A second season started airing from 4 December 2022.

In May 2023, Nine confirmed the show would not be returning for a third season.

== Format ==
Each episode sees two professional chefs compete to recreate a brand-name snack or fast food item. The chefs present their replica snack to a panel of judges composed of workers involved with the manufacture of the snack, and the chef who is decided to have most faithfully recreated the snack wins the competition. During each episode, Jones visits the factory that manufactures each snack, comparing how accurately the chefs are recreating the item.

The first season of the show featured stand alone episodes following the original British format, while the second season shifted to a new knockout competition format.

Unlike the original series and the New Zealand version, the Australian version had a judge present with the chef's team during the reveal of the snack item, which was delivered to their restaurant by a masked delivery rider with the food items being delivered inside red briefcases.

== Episodes ==
=== Season 1 ===
| No. overall | No. in season | Snack | Chefs | Winner | Date aired | Aus. Viewers |
|---|---|---|---|---|---|---|
| 1 | 1 | Hungry Jack's Angry Whopper | Anna Polyviou vs Mitch Orr | Mitch Orr | 29 November 2021 | 603,000 |
| 2 | 2 | Cadbury Favourites (Picnic, Crunchie, Cherry Ripe) | Luci Khan vs Brian Geraghty | Brian Geraghty | 30 November 2021 | 538,000 |
| 3 | 3 | Vanilla Peters Drumstick | Claire Van Vuuren vs Nelly Robinson | Claire Van Vuuren | 6 December 2021 | 441,000 |
| 4 | 4 | Cheese Twisties | Jason Barratt vs Ben Devlin | Jason Barratt | 7 December 2021 | 453,000 |

=== Season 2 ===
| No. overall | No. in season | Snack | Chefs | Winner | Date aired | Aus. Viewers |
|---|---|---|---|---|---|---|
| 5 | 1 | Heat 1: Arnott's original Tim Tam and Iced VoVo | Adam D'Sylva vs Benjamin Cooper | Adam D'Sylva | 4 December 2022 | 379,000 |
| 6 | 2 | Heat 2: Domino's loaded pepperoni cheesy crust pizza | Laura Sharrad vs Duncan Welgemoed | Laura Sharrad | 5 December 2022 | 367,000 |
| 7 | 3 | Heat 3: Allen's Lollies (Snakes Alive, Sherbies, Bananas) | Darren Robertson vs Vincent Lim | Vincent Lim | 11 December 2022 | 412,000 |
| 8 | 4 | Heat 4: Cheese Cheezels and Chicken Jumpy's | Jarrod Walsh & Dot Lee vs Sam Young & Grace Chen | Jarrod Walsh & Dot Lee | 12 December 2022 | 346,000 |
| 9 | 5 | Semi-final: White chocolate & berry Streets Magnum Remixed and Bubble O' Bill | Adam D'Sylva vs Laura Sharrad vs Vincent Lim vs Dot Lee (Note: For the sake of fairness only one chef from the winning pair was allowed to continue competing in the finals.) | Adam D'Sylva and Laura Sharrad | 18 December 2022 | 321,000 |
| 10 | 6 | Grand Final: Four'n Twenty classic meat pie and sausage roll | Adam D'Sylva vs Laura Sharrad | Adam D'Sylva | 19 December 2022 | 311,000 |
