= Southon =

Southon is a surname. Notable people with the surname include:

- Arthur Eustace Southon (1887–1964), English Methodist minister
- Jamie Southon (born 1974), English footballer
- Mark Southon, New Zealand celebrity chef and TV personality
- Mike Southon (cinematographer), British cinematographer
- Mike Southon (writer), British entrepreneur and author
- Stephen Southon (1806–1880), English cricketer
