= Snack Masters (New Zealand TV series) =

New Zealand cooking competition TV series

- Genre: Reality television
- Presented by: Kim Crossman; Tom Sainsbury
- Theme music composer: Ludwig van Beethoven
- Opening theme: Opening stanza of Ode to Joy and Symphony No. 9 (Beethoven)
- Country of origin: New Zealand
- Original language: English
- No. of seasons: 2
- No. of episodes: 14

Production
- Executive producers: Hayley Cunningham, Andrew Szusterman
- Running time: 60 minutes, with commercials
- Production company: South Pacific Pictures

Original release
- Network: TVNZ 2
- Release: 20 April 2022 – 27 June 2024

Snack Masters is a New Zealand cooking competition television show based on the BAFTA-nominated British series Snackmasters. Broadcast by TVNZ 2, it was hosted by Kim Crossman and Tom Sainsbury.

In December 2021, South Pacific Pictures announced that they were making the series for TVNZ, with production due to begin in early 2022.

The series premiered on 20 April 2022 on TVNZ 2, with eight episodes being screened. The series has been referred to as Snackmasters NZ, and also Snack Masters NZ; however, the broadcast episodes are titled Snack Masters.

A second series started airing from 23 May 2024.

== Format ==
Each episode sees two professional chefs compete to recreate a brand-name snack or fast food item. The chefs are given to two days to develop their replicas, which are then presented panel made up of workers involved with the manufacture of the snack. The chef who is decided to have most faithfully recreated the snack wins the competition. During each episode, Sainsbury visits the factory that manufactures each snack, comparing how accurately the chefs are recreating the item.

The show featured stand-alone episodes, following the format of the original British series.

Unlike the original and Australian series, Tom Sainsbury delivers the food items himself with a modified backpack to both teams, but he never sees the contestants until the Cook-off. In season 2, he delivers the items exclusively on a motorbike.

Season 2 was shortened to 6 episodes. The Thursday 7:30pm timeslot on TV2 would be replaced by Gladiators.

== Episodes ==
=== Season 1 ===
No. in season	Snack	Chefs	Winner	Date aired
1	Boysenberry-flavoured Tip Top Trumpet	Dariush Lolaiy vs Ganesh Raj	Dariush Lolaiy	20 April 2022
2	McDonald's Big Mac and fries	Jamie Hogg-Wharekawa vs Cristian Pincheira	Cristian Pincheira	27 April 2022
3	RJ's Licorice Allsorts with Orange, Lime, Banana and Raspberry flavours	Maxine Scheckter vs Shaun Clouston (Former employee vs. employer)	Maxine Scheckter	4 May 2022
4	Big Ben Mince and Cheese Pie	Alfie Ingham vs Jess Granada (Taste of Auckland 2019 rematch, which was won by Jess)	Alfie Ingham	11 May 2022
5	Griffin's Toffee Pops	Shenine Dube and Grace Tauber vs Anna Weir	Anna Weir	18 May 2022
6	Kiwi Onion Dip and Eta's Salt & Vinegar Ripple Chips	Nathan Houpapa vs Mark Southon	Nathan Houpapa	25 May 2022
7	KFC Bucket of Chicken (plus Supercharged Twister with chicken tenders, sliced vegetables in a soft tortilla wrap)	Tim Read vs Gareth Stewart	Tim Read	1 June 2022
8	Golden Crumpets with Kiwi butter and Golden syrup	Jason Kim vs Leslie Hottiaux	Leslie Hottiaux	8 June 2022

=== Season 2 ===
- (2nd) - 2nd appearance in the show

No. in season	Snack	Chefs	Winner(s)	Date aired
1	Burger King Whopper and Rebel (Vegan) Whopper (plus Hash Bites)	Dariush Lolaiy (2nd) vs Jess Daniell	Jess Daniell	23 May 2024
2	The Original Kit Kat	Gareth Stewart (2nd) vs Mike Shatura	Gareth Stewart	30 May 2024
3	Wattie's Baked Beans (4 cans worth: 2 cans of with original recipe and 2 cans of Baked Beans with sausages under a shortened time limit of 60 minutes, but can presoak the beans overnight)	Jamie Hogg-Wharekawa (2nd) vs Lesley Chandra	Lesley Chandra	6 June 2024
4	Bluebird Burger Rings	Peter Gordon vs Hannah Miller Childs	Hannah Miller Childs	13 June 2024
5	Hell Pizza Lust Deluxe (Meat Deluxe) (With chorizo and steak made from scratch, but can pre-make the raw dough)	Matthew Casey (dairy-free chef, as he is lactose and dairy intolerant) vs Paul Patterson	Matthew Casey	20 June 2024
6	Arnott's Original Tim Tam (with Arnott's Iced Animals)	Bertrand Jang vs. Kyle Street	Draw, both winners Bertrand won with Iced Animals, while Kyle won with Tim Tam	27 June 2024

== Reception ==
=== Critical reception ===
The show garnered mixed reaction from the media. Writing for Stuff, food writer Emily Brookes commented on the skills of the chefs, but was critical that they were, due to shooting constraints, all Auckland-based., except ep.3 of season 1, which was based in Wellington and Levin. She would have preferred that they were given the opportunity to innovate and create, rather than just copy.

=== Awards ===
For the 2022 New Zealand Television Awards, the show was nominated in the category for Best Format Reality Series, but did not win.
