= Bluebird Foods =

New Zealand snack manufacturer

Bluebird Foods Ltd is a New Zealand division of the U.S.-based PepsiCo corporation, that manufactures snack foods. All snacks are manufactured at the Bluebird Foods factory in Wiri, Auckland.

== History ==
Originally part of Goodman Fielder, and then bought by Graeme Hart's Burns Philp, Bluebird Foods was purchased by PepsiCo in 2006. Prior to that, Burns Philp tried to sell Bluebird Foods to Nestlé with the Uncle Tobys sale. Nestlé was not interested and bought only Uncle Tobys business. In October 2005, Bluebird Foods acquired Krispa and Aztec from Hansells NZ. This made Bluebird Foods one of the largest snack food manufacturers in New Zealand. May 2006 saw Nestlé purchase the Uncle Tobys brand for NZ$1.1 billion. Bluebird Foods was able to use the Uncle Tobys brand until May 2007.

Later in 2008, the company started using foil to wrap most of their chips instead of the soft plastic material previously used. However, the soft plastic material is still used for corn snacks, such as Twisties, Burger Rings and Rashuns.

In November 2023, Bluebird partnered with Hellers to create Rashuns and Burger Rings flavoured sausages as a limited edition. They have also partnered with Wattie's to make Tomato Sauce and Mince Pie flavoured chips.

== Marketing ==
In 2009, Bluebird Foods teamed up with The Rock radio station and rebranded "The People's Chip" campaign from Australia's radio presenter duo Hamish & Andy. In Australia, the chip flavour as voted for by listeners was gravy, while in New Zealand the flavour selected was marmite and cheese – a flavour already produced by Walkers in the UK, who have the same parent company as Bluebird Foods.

== Brands ==
=== Current brands ===
- Bluebird Original Cut Chips – ready salted/chicken/salt & vinegar/sour cream & chives/green onion
- Burger Rings – corn-based burger-flavoured snacks
- Cheezels – cheese-flavoured corn snacks
- Copper Kettle – potato chips
- Crackers – since 2026
- Delisio – potato chips
- Doritos – American brand of potato chips
- Cheetos – American corn puff snack
- Grain Waves – multigrain chips
- Lay's – American brand, made in New Zealand
- Nobby's – peanuts and cashews, imported from fellow PepsiCo company, Smith's Chips in Australia
- Poppa Jacks
- Red Rock Deli – imported from fellow PepsiCo company, Smith's Chips in Australia
- Ruffles – American brand, made in New Zealand
- Smith Staxs – imported from fellow PepsiCo company, Smith's Chips in Australia
- Twisties – cheese flavoured snacks
- Rashuns
- Popcorners – Popcorn snack

=== Discontinued brands ===
- Aztec Corn Chips – replaced with Doritos
- Biguns
- CC's corn chips – replaced with Doritos
- Party Corn Chips
- Sensations
- Uncle Toby Chewy
- Krispa Chips
- Smiths Stax (In NZ)
- Roll Ups
- Le Snak – cheese and crackers
