= Toobs =

Australian snack food

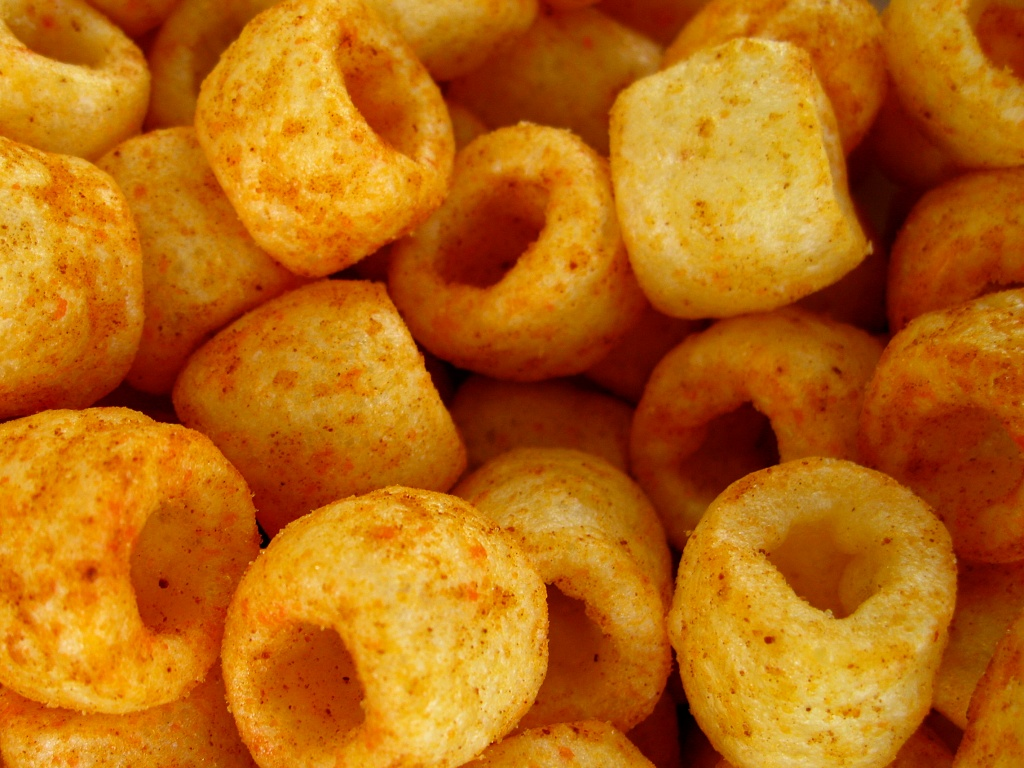
- Close up of a bowl of toobs
- Alternative names: Tasty Toobs
- Course: Snack
- Place of origin: Australia
- Created by: Albert Cranum
- Invented: 1954
- Serving temperature: Room temperature
- Main ingredients: Wheat, sunflower oil, wheat starch

Toobs (later known as "Tasty Toobs") are a brand of Australian snack food, first created in 1954 by Albert Cranum, and owned and sold by the British Australian company The Smith's Snackfood Company, trading as "Smith’s". The wheat-based flavoured snacks took their name from their characteristic shape.

Peaking in popularity during the 1970s, Toobs were considered a novelty crisp and could be found in supermarkets and selected convenience stores. They are also available in a tomato flavour.

Availability has been inconsistent. Toobs were unavailable from 2001 to 2007, and again from 2015 to 2021.

== Production cease 2001 and 2007 return ==
Production ceased in 2001, but resumed in 2007 with the new name "Tasty Toobs". The Herald Sun attributed a resurgence in popularity of the rings and the Samboy potato chips to the Great Recession.

The product gained some media attention when its Wikipedia page was vandalized in 2014.

The Smith's Snackfood Company ceased production of Toobs in 2015 due to poor consumer demand.

On 27 October 2015, as bags of Tasty Toobs became scarce, a Melbourne radio station announced that they would give away their last bags of Tasty Toobs to a listener.

== 2015 campaign to bring back Toobs ==
After the announcement of the discontinuation of Toobs in 2015, there was a public outcry. Cricketer Shane Warne attempted to start a campaign on Twitter to bring back Toobs using hashtags #BringBackToobs and #savetoobs. However, the company was adamant, noting that despite the sentiment, actual sales were the issue: Smith's Consumer Information Centre stated that "Consumer demand for the tangy, tomatoey treat has declined and it is no longer possible to justify on-going production."

== 2021 return ==
In May 2021, Smith's announced they might be considering bringing Toobs back into production. After six years of absence, Smiths confirmed that Tasty Toobs are officially back, with 35g and 150g bags appearing on shelves across Australia from 27 July 2021.

Initial sales were brisk, with some stores running out of stock and people offering very expensively priced packs on eBay. In August 2021, Smiths announced that the return of Toobs would only be a limited edition, available for six months. This initial run was all manufactured overseas. In December 2021 it was reported that Tasty Toobs would make a permanent return across Australian stores, and that production would be split across two locations. The Australian-made version, available only in New South Wales and Queensland, is said to have a "firmer bite" and became available from 20 December 2021.
