= Thins =

Brand of potato chips

Thins is an Australian brand of savoury snack potato chips. The range is owned by Snack Brands Australia (who in turn is owned by Intersnack). The chips are sliced thinner than regular chips. Thins was featured as an asset in the ownership changes of its parent companies.

== Product ==
Thins are a thinly sliced variety of potato chip (crisp). As of 2025 they are sold in original, salt and vinegar, light and tangy, chicken, cheese and onion, sour cream and chives, Himalayan salt and margarita flavours. Thins' flavour compositions are largely shared with major competitor Smith's Thinly Cut, another thinly sliced potato chip, along with various crinkle cut brands.

== History ==
The Thins website claims the brand was conceived in the 1950s in Australia. Contrastingly, the Australian Financial Review stated that the brand was created under the Arnott's Group in the "late 1960s". Thins' first change in ownership was Arnott's rebrand to Frito-Lay Australia after PepsiCo bought a half-stake of the company in 1991. This resulted in re-labelling the Thins brand jointly with Pepsi's own brand of thin potato chips, Lay's. Chips were sold under the moniker Thins: now known internationally as Lay's.

In 1997, Arnott's was bought by the Campbell Soup Company. In the same year, Frito-Lay "advised the ACCC that its parent, PepsiCo Inc., intended to buy ...The Smiths Snackfood Company". As a part of this deal, Thins was divested to Snack Foods Limited (then owned by Dollar Sweets Holdings) but Smiths (under PepsiCo) continued to produce its own line of potato chips under the "Lay's" brand name. For a while, there were two competing lines of potato chips released in Australia that were effectively the same product and even shared similar packaging since the Thins packet design was based on the Lay's packaging in North America.

In 2002, Snack Foods Limited was repurchased by Arnott's (now under Campbell Soup Company). Smith's produced a line of potato chips under the Lay's brand for a brief period until it was eventually rebranded as Smith's Crisps (now Smith's Thinly Cut), and the traditional Smith's line was renamed Smith's Crinkle Cut. Thins is still sold in Australia as a direct competitor to Smith's Chips.
