= Smiths (snack foods) =

Snack food manufacturing company

Smith's
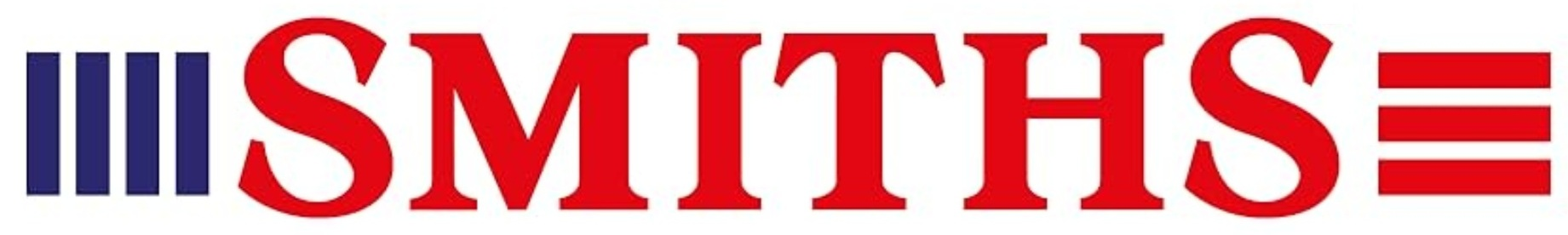
- Top: Logo in Australia and Oceania regions Bottom: Logo in the United Kingdom
- Product type: Food (snack foods, potato crisps)
- Current owner: PepsiCo
- Produced by: The Smith's Snackfood Company (Australia); Walkers Snacks (UK)
- Introduced: 1920; 106 years ago in Cricklewood, London, England, 1932; 94 years ago in Australia and 1958; 68 years ago in Netherlands
- Website: smiths-chips.com.au

Smith's, known as Smiths in the United Kingdom, is a snack food brand owned by PepsiCo, best known for its brand of potato crisps. In the United Kingdom, where the business initially started, it is now a sub-brand made by PepsiCo subsidiary Walkers Snack Foods, while in Australia, The Smith's Snackfood Company is the PepsiCo subsidiary that manufacturers and sells its crisp products.

The company was founded in the United Kingdom in 1920 by Frank Smith and Jim Viney, originally packaging a twist of salt with its crisps in greaseproof paper bags which were sold around London. Incorporated as a private limited company in 1930, Smith's became the dominant brand of crisps in Britain and remained so until the 1960s when Golden Wonder took over with Cheese & Onion, Smith's countered by creating Salt & Vinegar flavour (first tested by their north-east England subsidiary Tudor) which was launched nationally in 1967. Smith's came under the same owners as Walkers in 1982, when Nabisco purchased the business.

After establishing the product in his home country, Smith set up the company in Australia in 1932 and the Netherlands in 1958. All three Smiths companies underwent various owners, but were reunited under PepsiCo ownership, with the UK business being purchased in 1989, the Dutch business in 1992 and the Australian business in 1998. The Smith's brand is no longer active today in Benelux, and was replaced by the Lay's brand in 2001. Since 1982, Smith's have been produced under licence in Dubai by Saigol & Gulf, and sold across the AGCC, Pakistan and India as well as parts of Africa.

== United Kingdom ==
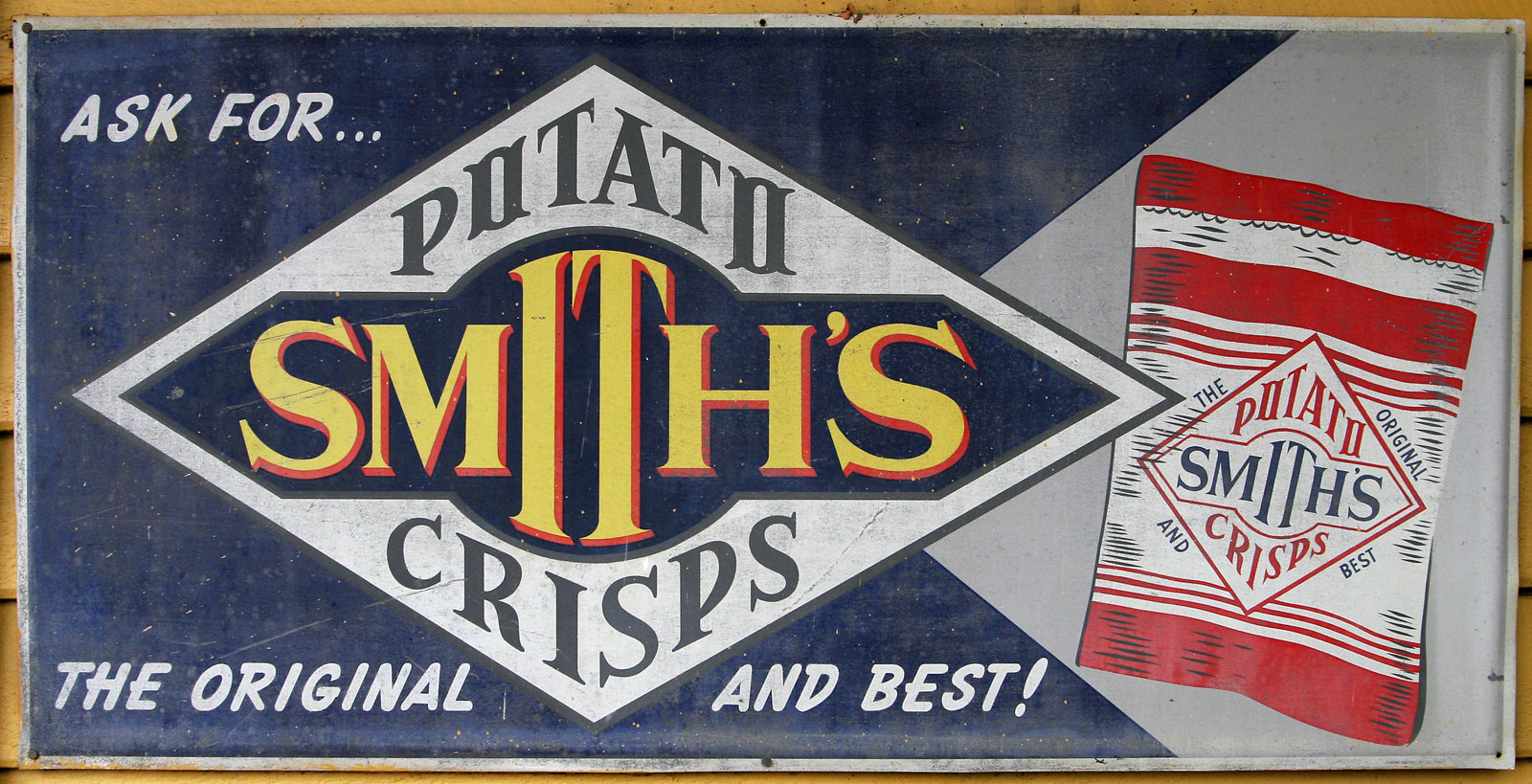
An early Smith's advertisement

Smith's Potato Crisps (Ltd.) was formed by entrepreneurs Frank Smith and Jim Viney in the United Kingdom after World War I. Smith had been a manager for a Smithfield wholesale grocery business which sold potato crisps from 1913. Deciding to make his own, Smith converted garages in Cricklewood, London, into a crisp factory, selling to local businesses. By 1920, he had 12 full-time employees and was producing half a million packets a week. Smith conceived the idea of selling unseasoned potato crisps with a small blue sachet of salt that could be sprinkled over them. In 1927, after buying Jim Viney's share of the business, the company expanded into a factory in Brentford, London. In 1929, Smiths had seven factories in the UK and the following year it was incorporated as a private limited company. By 1934, 200 million packets of crisps were sold in Britain each year, 95 percent of which were manufactured by Smith's. In 1939, the footballers of Portsmouth won the last FA Cup final before the war on a daily diet of Smith's crisps. During World War II, crisps were packed into British troop ships and sent off to allied forces. In the 1950s, fictional matriarch Doris Archer from BBC Radio's The Archers published a cookbook advocating the use of "delicious Smith's potato crisps, crushed to farthing size" in various meals.

By 1956, the company was making 10 million packets every week. In 1960, Smith's purchased northern rival Tudor Crisps for £1 million. Smith's followed up this expansion two years later by purchasing the biscuit and wafer producer G & T Bridgewater and the Cardiff-based nut company Snackpak Food Products. Following the creation of Cheese & Onion flavour by Tayto in Ireland, Golden Wonder (Smiths' main competitor in Britain) produced their Cheese & Onion version, and Smith's countered with Salt & Vinegar (tested first by their north-east England subsidiary Tudor) which launched nationally in 1967, starting a two-decade-long flavour war.

In 1966, Smith's was purchased by the American food producer General Mills and led to the legal renaming of Smith's Potato Crisps to Smith's Food Group in 1967 and a new head office in Kew, London. Smith's launched a ‘Do The Crunch' advertising campaign; in 1967 a young Phil Collins toured the UK teaching people the crunch dance. In 1968 Smiths created Quavers in their factory on Newark Road in Lincoln, Lincolnshire. Aimed at children, Monster Munch were launched by Smiths in Britain in 1977. Originally called "The Prime Monster" (a play on The Prime Minister, and as part of a wider campaign), they were renamed "Monster Munch" in 1978. In 1978, Smith's was sold by its parent company, General Mills, to the British biscuit giant Associated Biscuits.

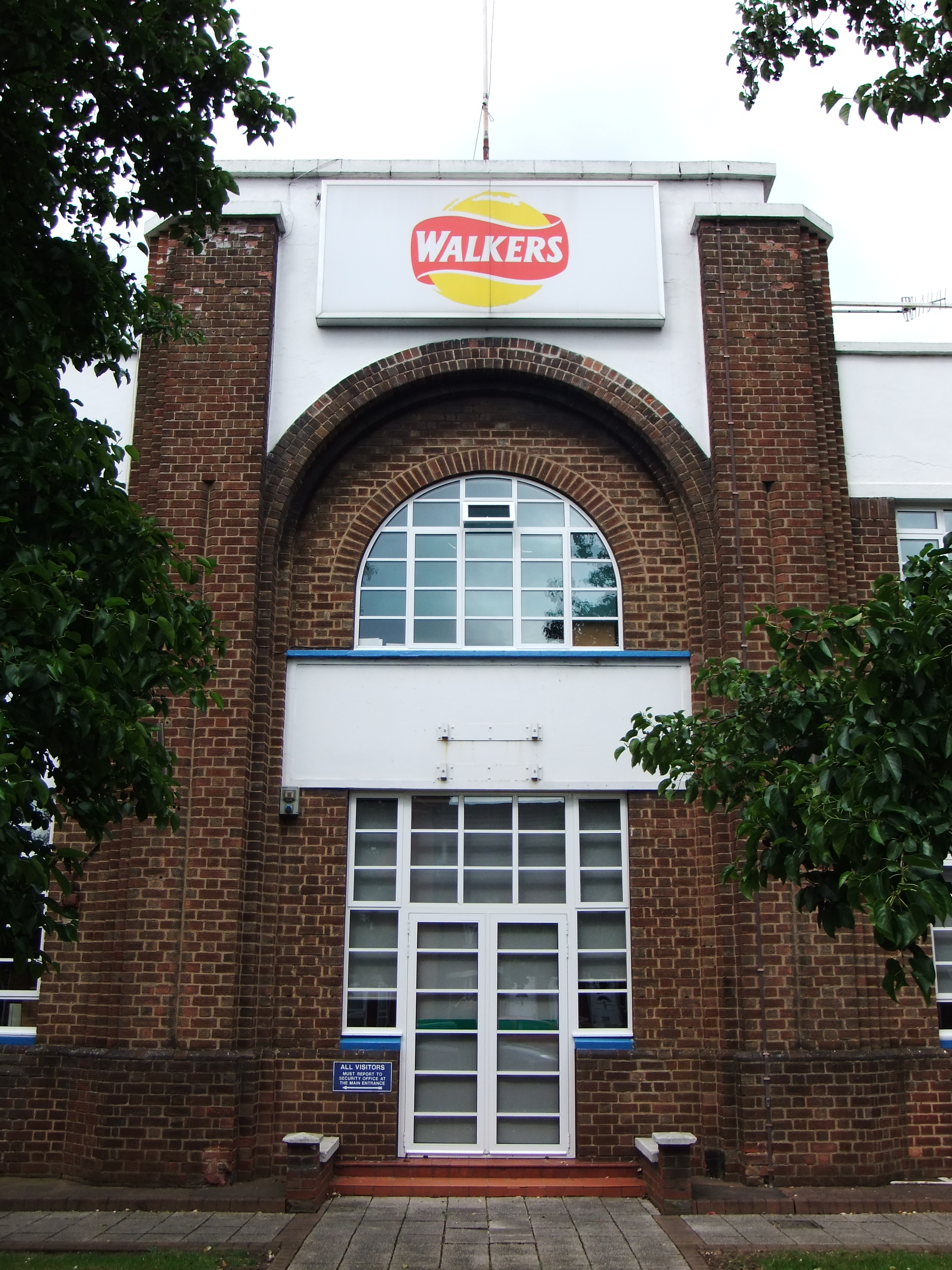
The former Smith's crisps factory at Newark Road in Lincoln, Lincolnshire, opened in 1937, now operates under the Walkers brand.

Associated Biscuits was purchased by Nabisco in 1982, bringing Smith's under the same ownership as rival Walkers. In 1988, RJR Nabisco was purchased in a leverage buyout by Kohlberg Kravis Roberts & Co, and to reduce debt several business were sold to French conglomerate BSN, who quickly sold on Smith's and Walkers to PepsiCo in 1989. At the time Walkers had a third of the crisp market in the United Kingdom, while Smith's had a third of the extruded snacks market, making them the market leader.

In 1990, Smith's launched the PepsiCo product Cheetos, selling the product for 10 years before it was dropped. Throughout the 1990s, major products released under the Smiths brand began to slowly transition to the Walkers brand, including Quavers (1993), Monster Munch (1994), Squares (2001), Salt & Shake (2003), and Frazzles (2005). The Walkers brand was eventually turned into PepsiCo's main Crisp brand, using a campaign featuring former England international footballer turned television presenter Gary Lineker.

The Smith's brand would remain in use as PepsiCo's value snack lineup, which by May 2013, had consisted of classic Smith's mainstays Chipsticks and Frazzles, former Walkers product Snaps, as well as Wafflers and Twisted; two products that were first introduced as Wotsits variants. In October 2025, it was announced that production of Snaps at the Newark Road factory in Lincoln would end.

=== Current products ===
- Chipsticks – Extruded corn starch snack in the shape of a french fry, in a salt and vinegar flavour.
- Frazzles – Extruded corn starch snack in the shape of a bacon rasher, in a bacon flavour.
- Bacon Fries – Extruded cereal starch snack, in a bacon flavour.
- Scampi Fries – Extruded cereal starch snack, in a scampi flavour.
- Snaps – Potato snack in the shape of a curled up rectangle, in a spicy tomato flavour (originally produced by Walkers).
- Smith's Crisps – Potato crisps in Ready Salted, Salt & Vinegar or Cheese & Onion flavours in 5-pack multipacks.

== Australia ==
After establishing the product and name in the UK, Frank Smith moved to set up a subsidiary in Australia. Smith's Crisps were first manufactured in Australia in 1931 with an associate, George Ensor, in leased premises in Sydney's Surry Hills. They were originally made in 20 gas fired cooking pots, then packed by hand and distributed by Nestle confectionery vans.

Smith's Potato Crisps sold its early crisps in three penny packets, 24 to a tin. "Twist of salt" sachets were included before pre-salting had been introduced. In March 1932, Smith's Potato Crisps Ltd. went into voluntary liquidation as a result of the Great Depression. However, three months later, George Ensor tendered for the business put up for sale by the liquidators, and on 13 May 1932, Smith's Potato Crisps (Australia) was formed with the UK Smith's Company holding a majority interest over minor shareholders. Growth after World War II was rapid, so a continuous cooker process was introduced to replace the individual cooking pots and in 1960 the production of a one shilling pack for cinemas and a box pack for four shillings was initiated.

In 1961, Smith's introduced its first flavoured chip – chicken. It was a very popular flavour, influencing most competitors at the time to adopt a Chicken variation. Other flavours released were Original (Pre-Salted) and Salt & Vinegar. Later, in the 1970s, Barbecue was added as a flavour for Smiths crinkle cut chips, and in the 1980s Cheese & Onion was added. These five flavours—Original Salted (blue packet), Salt & Vinegar (magenta packet), Chicken (green packet), Barbecue (orange packet) and Cheese & Onion (yellow packet—have remained the mainstay flavours of the brand since the 1980s. Many other 'limited edition' variants have also been tried over the years. During the late 1980s, the company introduced the famous advertising mascot Gobbledok, a chip-obsessed alien character similar to the popular characters E.T. and ALF.

In 1968, Associated Products and Distribution Pty Ltd (APD), the food group holding company in British Tobacco Co. (Aust), bought a 41.5% share of Smith's Potato Crisps (Australia)'s parent company, including all Australian shareholders. Over the next 20 years, other takeovers and new products (including Twisties and Burger Rings brands) drove growth. In 1990, the APD name was replaced by CCA Snackfoods. In January 1993, CCA Snackfoods (then owned by Coca-Cola Amatil) was sold to United Biscuits of Britain and was renamed to Smith's Snackfood Company.

As of 1998, the Smith's Snackfood company was Australia's largest producer of salty snack foods. It was acquired in August of that year by Frito-Lay, the second largest producer of salt snack foods in Australia, which is in turn owned by PepsiCo. Frito-Lay's Australian business was merged into Smiths, including its brands Lay's, Doritos, Cheetos, Ruffles and Tostitos. To prevent the Australian Competition & Consumer Commission from intervening for unfair trading practices Frito-Lay divested a range of brands, manufacturing facilities, including plants in Western Australia, South Australia, New South Wales and Victoria. The package was named Snack Brands Australia and was sold to Dollar Sweets Holdings. In that package included the brands sold were CC's, Cheezels, Thins and Samboy.

Despite Australians using the term "chips" for crisps, Smith's called their product crisps until as late as 2003. They are now labelled as Smith's Chips. As of 2010–2011, portions contained in "large" bags of Smith's Snackfood products have diminished, down from 200g to 175g (approximately equal to the previous 1975 large size of 6½oz).

Smith's Snackvend Stand is the branch of the company that operates vending machines.

=== Recalls ===
Products produced by The Smith's Snackfood Company have been recalled on several occasions, including:

- On three occasions, February 2007, December 2008 and June 2009, the Crinkle Cut chips were recalled after rubber pieces were discovered in packets.
- On two occasions, in October 2022 and May 2023, the Crinkle Cut chips were recalled after plastic pieces were discovered in packets.

=== Misleading representation of products ===
In July 2016, The Smith's Snackfood Company was fined $10,800 by the Australian Competition & Consumer Commission for misleading representation on its Sakata Paws Pizza Supreme Rice Snacks, which included a logo with the words "Meets School Canteen Guidelines" and an image of a sandwich and apple. The disclaimer that the product had only met the 'Amber' criteria of the National Healthy School Canteens Guidelines were in small font and on the other side of the packaging to the logo. Smith's has since removed the logo from the product.

=== Current products ===
- Burger Rings – Hamburger-flavoured snack.
- Cheetos – Cheese or flamin' hot flavour puffs.
- Cool Pak Popcorn
- Doritos – Corn chip
- Grain Waves – Wholegrain chips.
- Maxx – Multiple flavoured chips.
- Nobby's – Nuts
- Parker's – Australia's largest pretzel company – typical hard pretzels and a variety of uniquely flavoured pretzels, including flavours such as Tomato & Basil & Sweet Chili.
- Red Rock Deli – Thick-sliced premium potato chips.
- Sakata – Rice crackers
- Smith's Crinkle Cut – Crinkle-cut potato chips.
- Smith's Popped – Air-popped potato snacks.
- Lay's Stax – A competitor of Pringles.
- Smith's Thinly Cut – Thinly sliced potato chips available in various flavours.
- Twisties – A cheese or chicken flavoured extruded snack.

=== Gobbledok marketing ===
The Gobbledok stalking some Smiths chips.

The Gobbledok is a fictitious television character used to promote The Smith's Snackfood Company brand potato chips in Australia. A light brown alien from "Dok the Potato Planet", the Gobbledok was known for its multi-colored mohawk hairstyle, its obsession for eating Smith's potato chips, and its catchphrase "chippie, chippie, chippie!"

Initially conceived for a one-off advertisement by John Finkelson of Sydney's George Patterson Advertising agency, the Gobbledok was designed and created by special effects worker Warren Beaton, who later worked for Wētā Workshop. The character's unexpected success led to numerous further appearances between 1987 and 1996. It continues to make occasional appearances in commercials and on packaging, and was used in an advertisement in 2021 to commemorate The Smith's Snackfood Company's 90th anniversary in Australia. The Gobbledok was voiced by Dave Gibson, who was also known for voice-work on the TV series Australia's Funniest Home Videos. Gibson reprised his role as the character's voice for the 2021 advertisement.

== Netherlands ==
Frank Smith, working together with local farmers, opened a Dutch branch company in Broek op Langedijk in 1958. The new factory produced Smith's crisps with local potatoes. Gerrit Kistemaker is credited for bringing crisps into the country having learnt how to make them from Smith himself. Because of difficult pronunciation of the word "Crisps" and to avoid confusion, the products were named and marketed in the Netherlands as "Smiths Chips" (reflecting the common American English term). The Dutch company was purchased by the American General Mills in 1967 a year after it bought the British company and its legal name later changed from Smith's Potato Crisps Holland N.V. to Smiths Food Group B.V.

Smiths introduced the curly Wokkels chips for the first time in 1974.

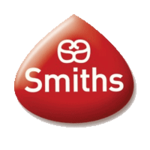
Final logo used for Smiths in Netherlands and Belgium

In 1992, General Mills (owner of the Dutch Smith's) entered into a joint venture with PepsiCo, combining their businesses in continental Europe under the name Snack Ventures Europe (PepsiCo acquired a 60% stake in this joint venture, and General Mills the remaining 40%) with headquarters in Maarssen. General Mills also had operations in Belgium and France, whereas PepsiCo had operations in Spain, Portugal and Greece (where they marketed the Doritos and Cheetos brands). General Mills sold its part in the joint venture to PepsiCo in 2005.

In 1995, Smiths caused a fad when the company included put collectibles called Flippo's in crisp bags. They were highly popular in the Netherlands and Belgium over the next two years.

The Smiths potato chips was marketed in the Netherlands and Belgium until January 2001 when the brand was replaced by the global name Lay's. The brand continued to be used for the other chips snack products (such as Bugles, Hamka's and Wokkels), and Smiths Food Group B.V. remained the legal name of the company, marketing and selling all PepsiCo brands in the Netherlands. In December 2010 the company's legal name changed over to PepsiCo Nederland B.V. (and PepsiCo BeLux) and in 2016 the remaining Smiths branded snacks were rebranded to the umbrella brand Lay's or to Cheetos, ending the Smiths brand in this market after more than 50 years.

== Licensed manufacturing ==
In 1982, Saigol & Gulf started manufacturing crisps using the Smith's brand under licence from the Smiths Group in the UK. Products sold under the Smith's brand, advertised as being established in 1982, include Chipsticks, Square Crisps, Quavers, Al Nakheel and Cheezers. The brand has also been added to cooking sauces.

== Previous products ==
- Bats – Batburger flavoured snack in shape of bats, manufactured in the 1970s. A part of the Horror bags range.
- Battle Bags Battle Tanks – Cheese & Onion flavoured snack in shape of tanks, manufactured in the 1970s. A part of Battle Bags range.
- Battle Bags Fighter Planes – Salt & Vinegar flavoured snack in shape of planes, manufactured in the 1970s. A part of Battle Bags range.
- Bones – Salt & Vinegar flavoured snack in shape of bones, manufactured in the 1970s. A part of the Horror bags collection.
- Cheezers – Cheese flavoured corn puffs.
- Cheese Flavoured Moments – Cheese flavoured triangles, with a cheese powder centre.
- Cheetos – A crunchy corn-cheese puff.
- Chinese Quavers – Spicy beef flavoured.
- Chipitos – Toasted cheese puffs.
- Chipsticks – Ready salted flavoured.
- Claws – Bacon flavoured snack in shape of claws, manufactured in the 1970s. A part of the Horror bags collection
- Crispy Tubes – Manufactured during the 1980s and available in Lightly Salted and Salt & Vinegar flavours.
- Fangs – A Cheese & Onion flavoured snack in shape of fangs, manufactured in the 1970s. A part of the Horror bags collection.
- Farmer Browns – Animal-shaped cereal snack.
- Football Crazy – Corn and potato balls.
- French Fries – Small crisp potatoes straws similar in appearance and taste to french fries – now owned and manufactured by Snack Brands Australia and under the Walkers name.
- Full Monty – The flavour was inspired by the 1997 British film. The flavour was likely based on baked potatoes with cream cheese, onion, sour cream, bacon, garlic, and cheddar cheese as the components.
- Funyuns - an onion ring flavoured corn snack. Originally sold under the Walkers brand, they were revived under Smith's name in 2021.
- Hamka's – Ham and cheese crisps in the Netherlands, now sold under the Lay's name.
- Jackets – Manufactured during the mid-1980s, these were crisps where the potatoes had not been peeled, leaving potato skin around the edges. There was an advert which featured dancing potatoes singing "We want to be jackets" in falsetto voices, and the slogan "So good, every potato wants to be one".
- Lay's – Thinly sliced potato chips.
- Mama Mia's – In the Netherlands, now sold under the Lay's name.
- Maize Pops – Toffee-coated popped maize.
- Monster Munch – Currently manufactured under the Walkers name.
- Nibb-it – Was sold under the Smiths name in Netherlands and Belgium from 1998 to 2015, now sold under the Cheetos name.
- OnYums – Onion flavoured rings.
- Pomtips – Potato sticks sold in the Netherlands, now sold under the Lay's name.
- Quavers – Introduced in 1968, now sold under the Walkers name.
- Ribs – Vinegar-flavoured snack in shape of ribs, manufactured in the 1970s. Part of the Horror Bags range.
- Ruffles – Crinkle cut potato chips.
- Smiths Salt 'n' Shake – Currently manufactured under the Walkers name.
- Smith's Crisps
- Smith's Crinkle Cut Crisps – Crinkle cut crisps available in different flavours.
- Smith's Selections – Thinly sliced potato chips in a range of various flavours, now known as Smith's Thinly Cut.
- Smokees – Bacon flavoured curls.
- Squares – Ready Salted, Cheese & Onion, Salt & Vinegar flavour square-shaped potato crisps, currently manufactured under the Walkers name.
- Sunbites – Wholegrain chips.
- Thins – Thinly sliced potato chips, currently owned and manufactured by Snack Brands Australia.
- Thunder Bunders - Bundles of crisps, in snack portion sized packages.
- Tuba Loops – Tube-shaped potato snacks.
- Twists – Manufactured during the 1970s, these were available in Cheese & Onion, Salt & Vinegar, and Ready Salted flavours.
- Twisted – Flamin' hot flavour corn puffs, currently manufactured under the Cheetos brand.
- Wafflers – Bacon flavour waffles (previously sold as Wotsits).
- Wokkels – Curly crisps introduced in 1974 in the Netherlands, now sold under the Lay's name.
- Zodiacs – Mystery-flavoured snack in shape of zodiac signs.

== See also ==
- List of brand name snack foods
