= Burger Rings =

Australian snack

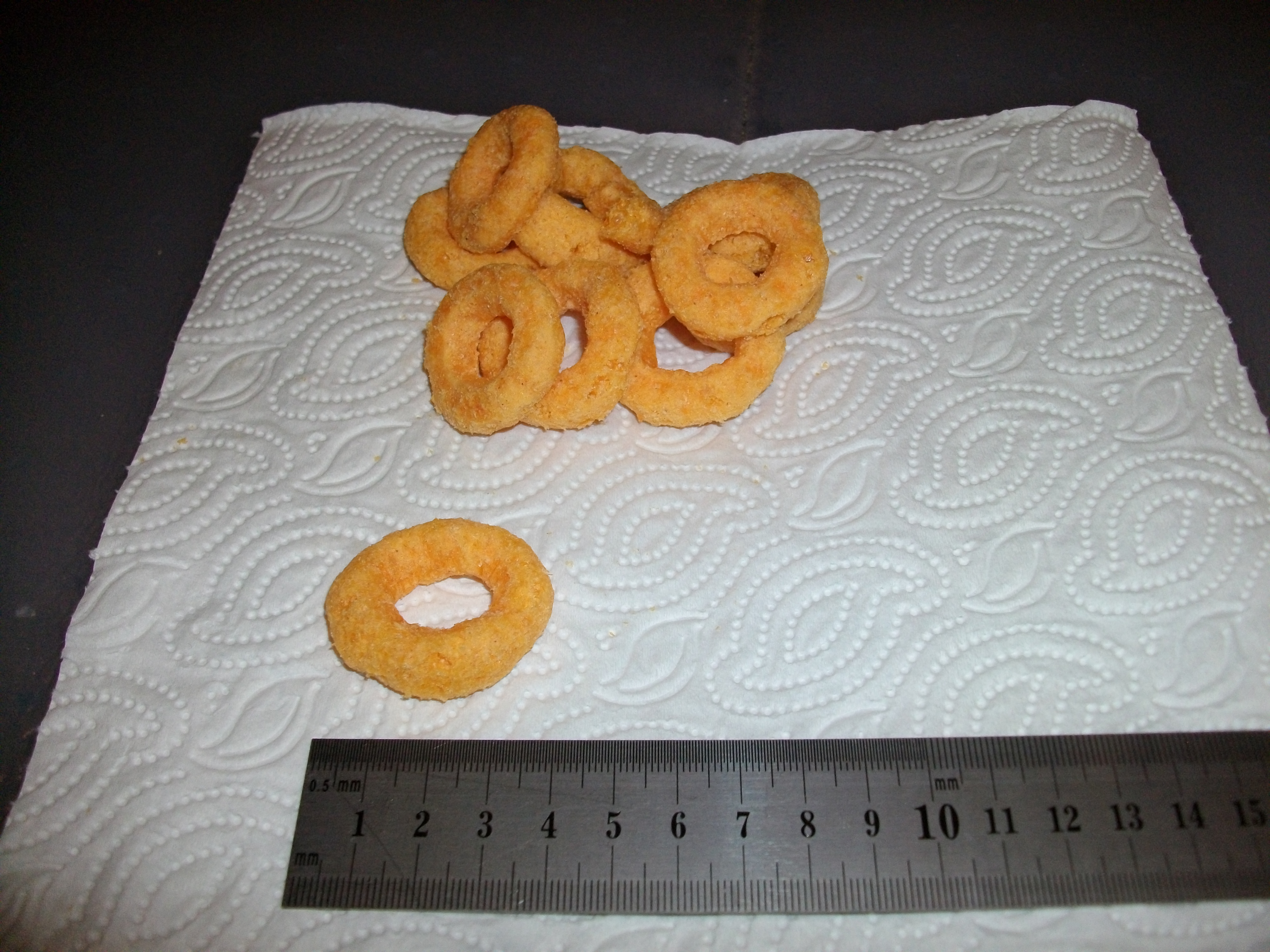
- Burger Rings
- Product type: Burger flavoured snacks
- Current owner: The Smith's Snackfood Company
- Introduced: 1974; 52 years ago
- Markets: Oceania
- Registered as a trademark in: The Smith's Snackfood Company (Australia); Burger Rings
- Tagline: Big burger taste (Australia)
- Website: www.smiths.com.au/brands/burger-rings

Burger Rings
Nutritional value per 100 g (3.5 oz)
- Energy: 2,190 kJ (520 kcal)
- Carbohydrates: 60.6 g
- Sugars: 2.7 g
- Dietary fibre: 2.1 g
- Fat: 27.9 g
- Saturated: 13.4 g
- Protein: 6.4 g
Vitamins and minerals
Minerals	Quantity %DV^{†}
Potassium	5% 163 mg
Sodium	42% 968 mg
- ^{†}Percentages estimated using US recommendations for adults, except for potassium, which is estimated based on expert recommendation from the National Academies.

Burger Rings are a type of corn-based, burger-flavoured Australian snack food distributed by the Smith's Snackfood Company, which in turn is owned by PepsiCo.

== History ==
Burger Rings were introduced in 1974.

During the late 1990s the Burger Rings brand went through a brand overhaul, coinciding with the acquisition of The Smith's Snackfood Company by Lays. During the brand overhaul the appearance of the packet was changed to a more modernised look with bolder and sharper letters in the logo, adopting its past logo.

== Ingredients ==
Burger Rings are made out of a combination of corn and rice. A Smith's Chips representative confirmed Burger Rings are suitable for vegans.

The ingredients for Burger Rings are as follows: cereals (maize, rice), vegetable oil, maltodextrin, rice bran, salt, sugar, hydrolysed vegetable protein (soy), flavour enhancer (621), food acids (sodium diacetate, citric acid), flavour, mineral salt (potassium chloride), yeast extracts, onion powder, tomato powder. It is also stated on the packaging "Contains Gluten", "Contains Milk or Milk Products", "Contains Soy Bean or Soy Bean Products" in contrast with majority of other packaging that states "may contain traces of..." which is confusing for vegans as it implies one or more of the ingredients are derived from Milk.

== Flavours ==
A Bacon Flavour variant was offered in Australia, briefly.

== Marketing ==
A memorable Star Wars-themed advertisement for the product was aired on Australian television in the early 1980s. It featured a faux Luke Skywalker character on Tatooine. After exiting his Landspeeder, he is confronted by a large group of Jawas who ask for his Burger Rings. He begrudgingly shares them only to be left with a single Burger Ring. A Jawa swiftly grabs that last one and the ad ends.

A radio ad campaign in the 1980s joked that Burger Rings were possibly made of rubber tyres concluding with the slogan "they taste good but!".

A 1989 ad aired on Australian television depicting a school chemistry experiment resulting in the creation of a single Burger Ring snack. The student who performed the experiment consumes the snack and seems to gain superpowers, developing jagged hair and a crazed look as the now-fluorescent Burger Ring bounces inside the boy's ribcage, made visible by a radiographic effect akin to X-ray imaging. This later turns out to be a daydream of the boy who has fallen asleep in a chemistry class, and continues to mix his chemicals in a sleepy haze.

A 1992 ad featured a man at a bus stop who attempts to steal one of the snacks from another man's packet, only having it growl like a dog and attack his arm, making him run away past a sign that says "WARNING - BURGER RINGS BITE". The owner then shares the packet with a woman on his other side.

== In popular culture ==
In 2014, a contestant on Australian quiz show Millionaire Hot Seat failed to identify "Burger ring" as the "gag answer" to the $100 question, "Which of these is not a piece of jewellery commonly worn to symbolise a relationship between two people?". The contestant instead incorrectly locked in "Anniversary ring". The contestant was invited back onto the set at the end of the program where host Eddie McGuire presented her with a packet of Burger Rings as a consolation prize.

In the 2016 comedy-drama film Hunt for the Wilderpeople, in a cameo appearance by the film's writer-director Taika Waititi, the character 'Minister' mentions Burger Rings twice in a mangled parable about Heaven: first as one of "the nummiest treats you can imagine" along with other snack food and beverage items such as Fanta, Doritos, Lemon & Paeroa and Coca-Cola Zero Sugar, and then as a designation of a door.

In 2024, it is the replication task for season 2, episode 4 of Snack Masters New Zealand.

== International variants ==
Burger Rings are available in New Zealand under the same name, except distributed by Bluebird Foods. The New Zealand variant has a different packaging design and a similar slogan: "Full on burger flavour". They are available in 30g and 120g bags, and in 108g 6-pack multipacks.
