= Beer Nuts =

Snack food brand

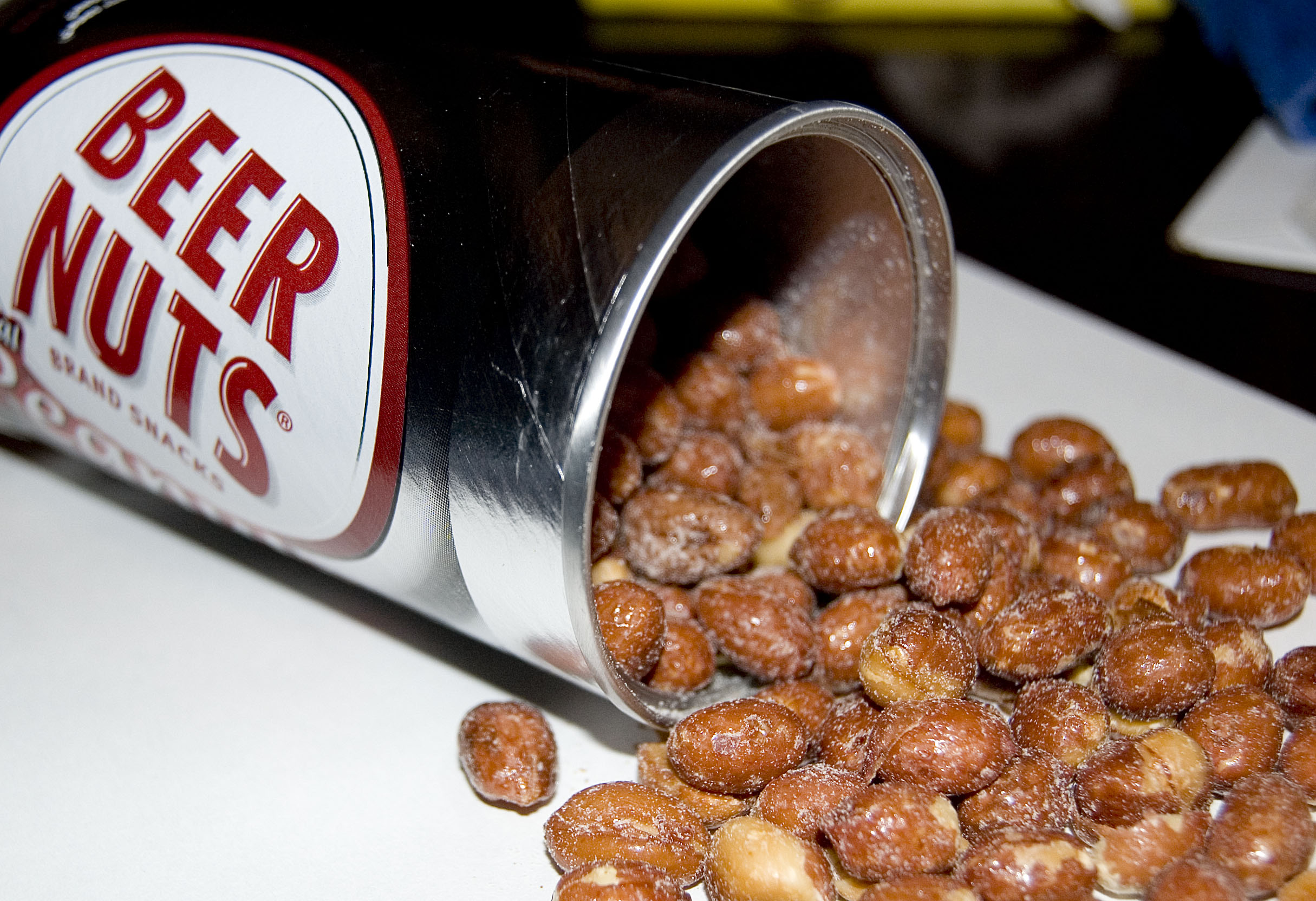
Original Beer Nuts in a pull-top "beer" can

Beer Nuts (stylized in all caps) is an American brand of snack food building on the original product, peanuts with a sweet-and-salty glazing. According to the manufacturer, the ingredients include peanuts, coconut oil, corn syrup and salt. In the United States, Beer Nuts are a staple of bar snacks and are often referred to as "the quintessential American bar food".

Although Beer Nuts do not contain any beer, the name suggests that they are intended as a side dish to beer consumption.

== History ==
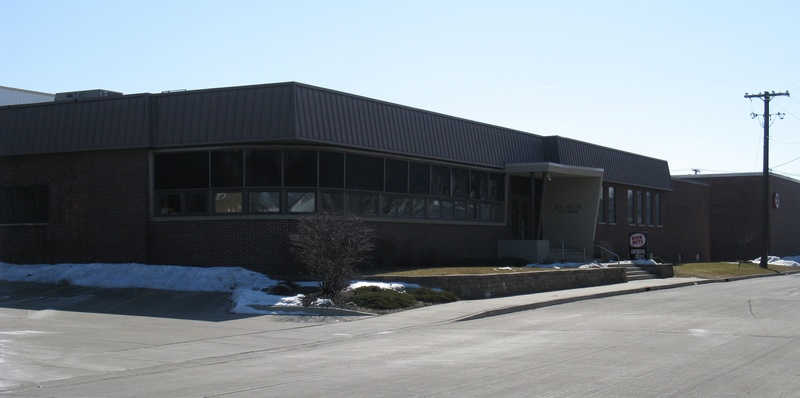
Beer Nuts Production Plant and Company Store in Bloomington, Illinois

The company began in 1937 when Edward Shirk and his son Arlo took over the Caramel Crisp confectionery store in Bloomington, Illinois, which sold a product called "Redskins," "slightly sweet, lightly salted" glazed peanuts with their red skins intact.

On returning from serving in WWII in the Coast Guard, Russell Shirk took over the Caramel Crisp Shop. Beginning in 1950, this product was sold packaged as "Shirk's Glazed Peanuts" in local liquor stores.

By 1953, local food distributor Eldredge C. Brewster helped expand the product to a national brand, and the Beer Nuts trademark was registered. By the 1960s, the product was available in all 50 states, and by the 1970s, the Shirks shipped 10 million pounds of Beer Nuts nationally. The company's product line has since expanded to other nuts, such as cashews and almonds, and various snack mixes, gift baskets and holiday packaged items.

The Beer Nuts brand has been registered as a trademark since 1955 and has been successfully protected in court on several occasions from competing brands who used similar names. Beer Nuts has been described as ”something of a case study in brands avoiding genericization”.

The company remains family owned with production still based in Bloomington, operating out of the 100,000-square-foot facility it relocated to in 1973. In 1974, Russell's son, Jim, took over as president and led the company for four decades. In 2018 Jim was followed by his son Adam who is now the third generation president.

== Other countries ==
In Australia, beer nuts refers to salted roasted peanuts with the testa (red skin) intact. They are sold unglazed.

== See also ==
- Japanese-style peanuts
- List of brand name snack foods
- List of peanut dishes
