= Le Snak =

Former Australasian cheese and cracker snack

- Product type: Snack
- Country: Australia, New Zealand
- Introduced: 1988
- Discontinued: 2022 (New Zealand)

Le Snak is a cheese and cracker snack, which has two compartments, one for the crackers, and one for a cheddar cheese spread which the crackers are dunked into. Manufactured by Bluebird, it was available exclusively in Australia and New Zealand, until 2022 when New Zealand production ceased. The product continues to be sold in Australia. It has no connection with France despite the French-sounding name. In Australia Le Snak is made by Uncle Tobys.

It is marketed as cheap and convenient, and is popular with students and office workers. Some consider Le Snak to be an "iconic lunchbox item".

== History ==
Le Snak was launched in 1988. In June 2022, PepsiCo announced that they would discontinue Le Snak in New Zealand due to a lack of demand. Production ended in May, however the product is still produced and sold in Australia. Bluebird said that the reason for this was "consumers' taste preferences have changed". Le Snak, this time made by Uncle Tobys, temporarily returned to New Zealand stores in June 2025.

In August 2022, the Australian Uncle Tobys Le Snak created a Vegemite flavour.
