= Beer Nuts (Australia) =

Snack food

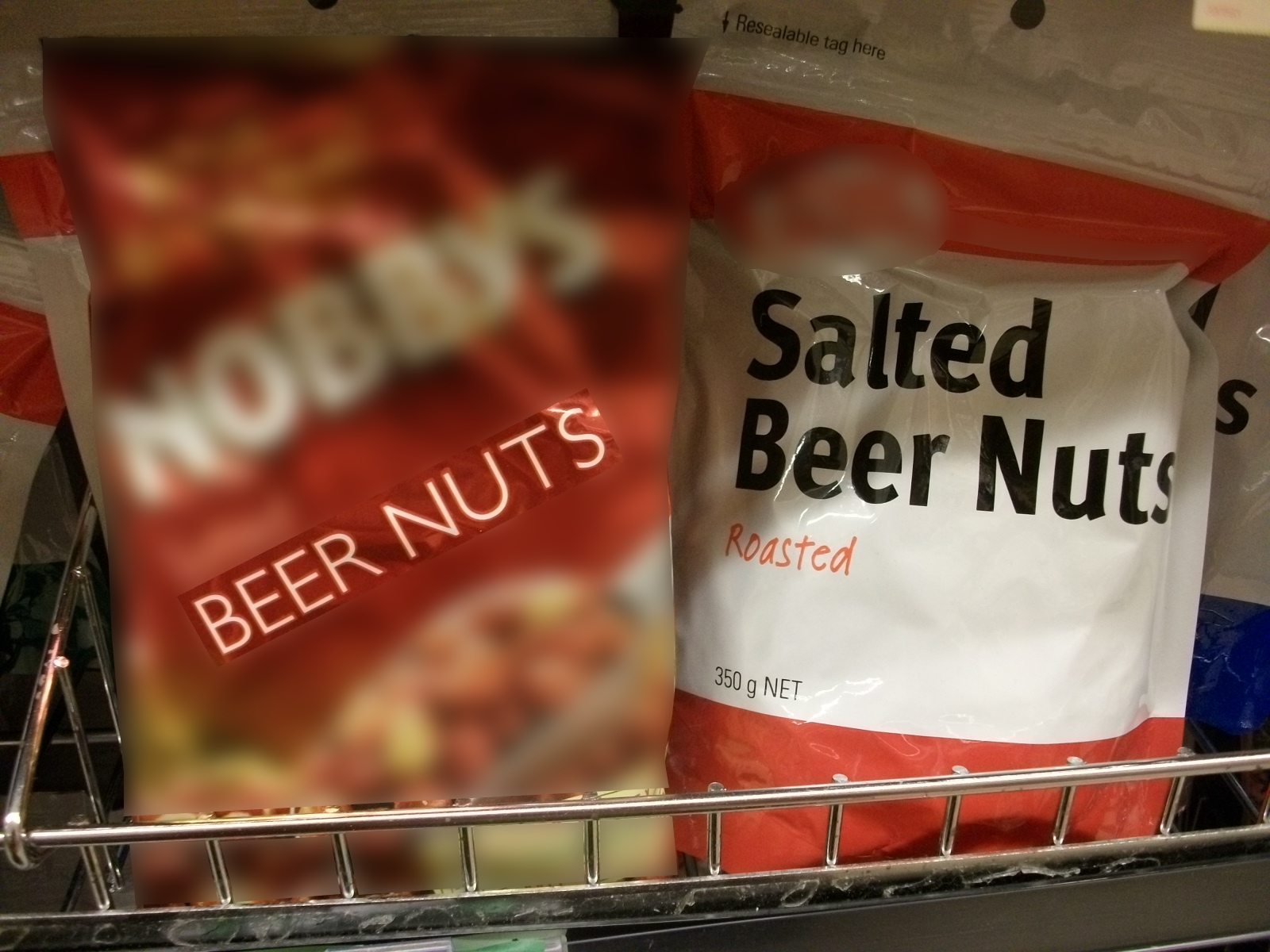
Name brand and generic Australian packaged beer nuts

Beer Nuts is a snack food of roasted, salted peanuts sold shelled but unhusked and not sweetened. Both generic and branded beer nuts exist, a notable Australian brand is Nobby's.

In the United States, Beer Nuts is a brand of sweet and salty glazed peanuts.

== See also ==
- List of peanut dishes
