= CC's =

Australian snack food

- Tasty Cheese CC's
- Type: Tortilla chip
- Place of origin: Australia
- Created by: Snack Brands Australia
- Main ingredients: Corn

CC's (pronounced sea-seas and short for “corn chips”) is an Australian brand of flavoured tortilla chips produced since the early 1980s, originally by The Smith's Snackfood Company, and currently by Snack Brands Australia. CC's are predominantly sold in Australia and come in assorted flavours. CC's were also sold in New Zealand until Bluebird Foods (the owner of the CC's brand in New Zealand) decided to locally produce the American brand Doritos in March 2010. However, the CC's brand returned to New Zealand shelves for a limited run in 2019, and returned for a second run in 2023. CC's are 100% Australian manufactured.

The chips are made of ground corn, vegetable oil, and seasoning. The full ingredients list is corn, vegetable oils (sunflower, palmolein), milk solids (cheese powder), food acids (270, 330, 331), flavour enhancers (621, 627, 631), starch (wheat, maize), vegetable powders (onion, tomato, garlic), salt, sugar, herbs, spice (cumin), flavour (natural and nature identical), yeast extract, vegetable extract (soy, wheat), antioxidants (304, 306).

== Flavours ==
CC's have four main flavours, original, tasty cheese, Tangy Salsa and nacho cheese. From time to time, CC's release tangy BBQ flavour. They recently added a limited edition" three cheese fiesta" in 2021.

== Promotion ==
CC's have been marketing with the tagline "You can't say no" since the beginning of 1980s, with the most notable campaign featuring The Simpsons during 1998. Since Arnotts sale of Snack Foods Limited, CC's have been marketed as being 100% Australian owned and made.

=== Simpsons commercials ===
CC's Dare #14: Escaping a water tank

In June 1998, The Simpsons featured on a set of television commercials with each commercial involving Homer Simpson wanting Bart Simpson's CC's, so Bart would make Homer do an outlandish stunt (a dare) to get them. Homer would never succeed because of Bart. Each commercial ended with a pun on the famous tagline "You can't say no" with Dan Castellaneta saying "CC's, you can't say..." and then Homer would say "D'oh!".

These adverts were similar to the Butterfinger adverts that aired in the United States from 1988 to 2001. Even though the commercials only ran on Australian television, they have been included in the DVD release of season 10.

Dare number	Description
2	Homer must run through the Power Plant naked, but he trips on a power cord and causes a town wide blackout.
9	Homer skydives from a plane and must catch the chips in freefall, but lands in a trampoline factory and bounces back up to the plane. Homer grabs Bart's chips on the way back up, but Bart opens Homer's parachute, sending him flying backwards.
14	Homer must escape from a water tank while straitjacketed and chained.
23	Homer has to jump off a cliff into the ocean. As soon as he emerges from the water, he sees his swimming trunks have come off.
38	As part of the dare, Bart performs a magic trick by cutting Homer in three. However, Homer can't eat the chips while separated.
65	Homer must walk across burning coals, but Bart has not lit them yet.

=== New Zealand ===
In New Zealand, CC's were marketed with the tagline "Only CC's is tasting like these".

== See also ==
- Corn chip
