= Snackmasters =

British television programme

- Presented by: Fred Sirieix; Jayde Adams
- Country of origin: United Kingdom
- Original language: English
- No. of seasons: 3
- No. of episodes: 10

Production
- Executive producer: Sarah Eglin
- Production company: Optomen Television

Original release
- Network: Channel 4
- Release: 1 October 2019 – 27 April 2021

Snackmasters is a BAFTA-nominated British television programme, presented by Fred Sirieix and Jayde Adams, and produced by Optomen Television and Channel 4. The programme was broadcast on Channel 4 and streams on All 4.

The programme sees two professional chefs compete to recreate a brand-name snack or fast food item. The chefs present their replica snack to a panel of judges composed of workers involved with the manufacture of the snack, and the chef who is decided to have most faithfully recreated the snack wins the competition. During each episode, presenter Jayde Adams visits the factory that manufactures each snack, comparing how accurately the chefs are recreating the process.

Snackmasters was nominated for a BAFTA award in the Best Feature category at the 2020 British Academy Television Awards.

An Australian adaptation of the show was first broadcast in November 2021 on the Nine Network. A New Zealand adaptation premiered on TVNZ 2 in April 2022.

== Episodes ==
Series 1
Episode	Chefs	Winner	Date aired
Episode 1: Kit Kat	Daniel Clifford and Vivek Singh	Vivek Singh	1 October 2019
Episode 2: Monster Munch	Tristan Welch and Matt Worswick	Matt Worswick	8 October 2019
Episode 3: Burger King Whopper	Lisa Goodwin-Allen and Claude Bosi	Lisa Goodwin-Allen	15 October 2019

Series 2
Episode	Chefs	Winner	Date aired
Episode 1: Quavers	Anna Haugh and Aktar Islam	Anna Haugh	10 December 2020
Episode 2: Domino's pepperoni pizza	Jason Atherton and Francesco Mazzei	Francesco Mazzei	17 December 2020
Episode 3: Quality Street ("Festive Special")	Paul A. Young and Sarah Mountain	Sarah Mountain	23 December 2020

Series 3
Episode	Chefs	Winner	Date aired
Episode 1: KFC Zinger burger, Original Recipe Chicken and Supercharger Mayo	Tom Aikens and Alex Bond	Tom Aikens	6 April 2021
Episode 2: Wagon Wheels	Tristan Welch and Cyrus Todiwala	Cyrus Todiwala	13 April 2021
Episode 3: Shreddies	Daniel Clifford and Claude Bosi	Daniel Clifford (by default)	20 April 2021
Episode 4: Snickers	Tom Brown and Sabrina Gidda	Tom Brown	27 April 2021

== International versions ==
=== Belgium ===
Since September 2020, VTM has aired three belgian seasons of Snack Masters and one Christmas special.

=== Australia ===
In September 2021, it was announced that Australia’s Nine Network had commissioned a local version of the series set to air in the fourth quarter of 2021, to be hosted by Scott Pickett and Poh Ling Yeow, with Yvie Jones as a co-presenter. The series premiered on 29 November 2021. A second season started airing from 4 December 2022, with the show shifting to a new knockout competition format.

=== New Zealand ===
A New Zealand-produced version, Snack Masters, premiered on TVNZ 2 on 20 April 2022, produced by South Pacific Pictures.

=== France ===
A French-produced version of Snackmasters premiered on M6 on 27 June 2023. The first episode was about McDonald's' Big Mac.
