= Yvie Jones =

Australian television personality (born 1972)

- Born: Yvie Jones; 19 November 1972 (age 53); Sydney, New South Wales
- Occupations: Television & radio presenter, reporter, warm-up comedian, caretaker
- Years active: 2015–present
- Known for: Gogglebox Australia

Yvie Jones (born 19 November 1972) is an Australian television personality, known for appearing alongside Angie Kent on Gogglebox Australia from 2015 to 2018.

== Career ==
Jones left Gogglebox Australia in December 2018. In January 2019, it was announced that Angie Kent and Jones would be appearing on the fifth season of I'm a Celebrity...Get Me Out of Here!, which began airing on 13 January 2019. Jones was the series' runner-up, losing to Richard Reid. She is a regular panellist on Studio 10 and The Project.

In June 2019, it was announced that Jones would fill in for Fifi Box on Fox FM's breakfast show, Fifi, Fev & Byron, while Box was on maternity leave. On 3 October 2019, the Hit Network announced that Jones would be joined by Grant Denyer during December to host the Grant and Yvie Show, a Summer breakfast show that would air on all of their major metro markets, except 2Day FM.

In 2020, she appeared in two episodes of Network 10's Drunk History Australia.

In 2021, she started the podcast Two Girls One Pod for Nova Podcasts with her best friend Angie Kent. Later in 2021 she started appearing as a co-presenter on the cooking competition show Snackmasters on the Nine Network, appearing alongside Poh Ling Yeow and Scott Pickett.

=== Television ===
Year	Title	Role	Notes
2025–2026	The House of Wellness	Herself	
2015–2018	Gogglebox Australia	Herself	68 episodes
2019	I'm a Celebrity...Get Me Out of Here!	Herself	24 episodes
2019	Chris & Julia's Sunday Night Takeaway	Herself	1 episode
2019	Celebrity Name Game	Herself	4 episodes
2019	The Celebrity Chase	Herself	1 episode
2019	Hughesy, We Have a Problem	Herself	Mystery Celebrity
2020	Drunk History Australia	Madame Marchesi/Beryl Mills mother	2 episodes
2021–2022	Snackmasters	Herself	10 episodes
2023	Darradong Local Council	Karen Smith-Theopoulos	3 episodes
2023	Deadloch	Airtasker	2 episodes
