= Mark Southon =

New Zealand chef and television personality

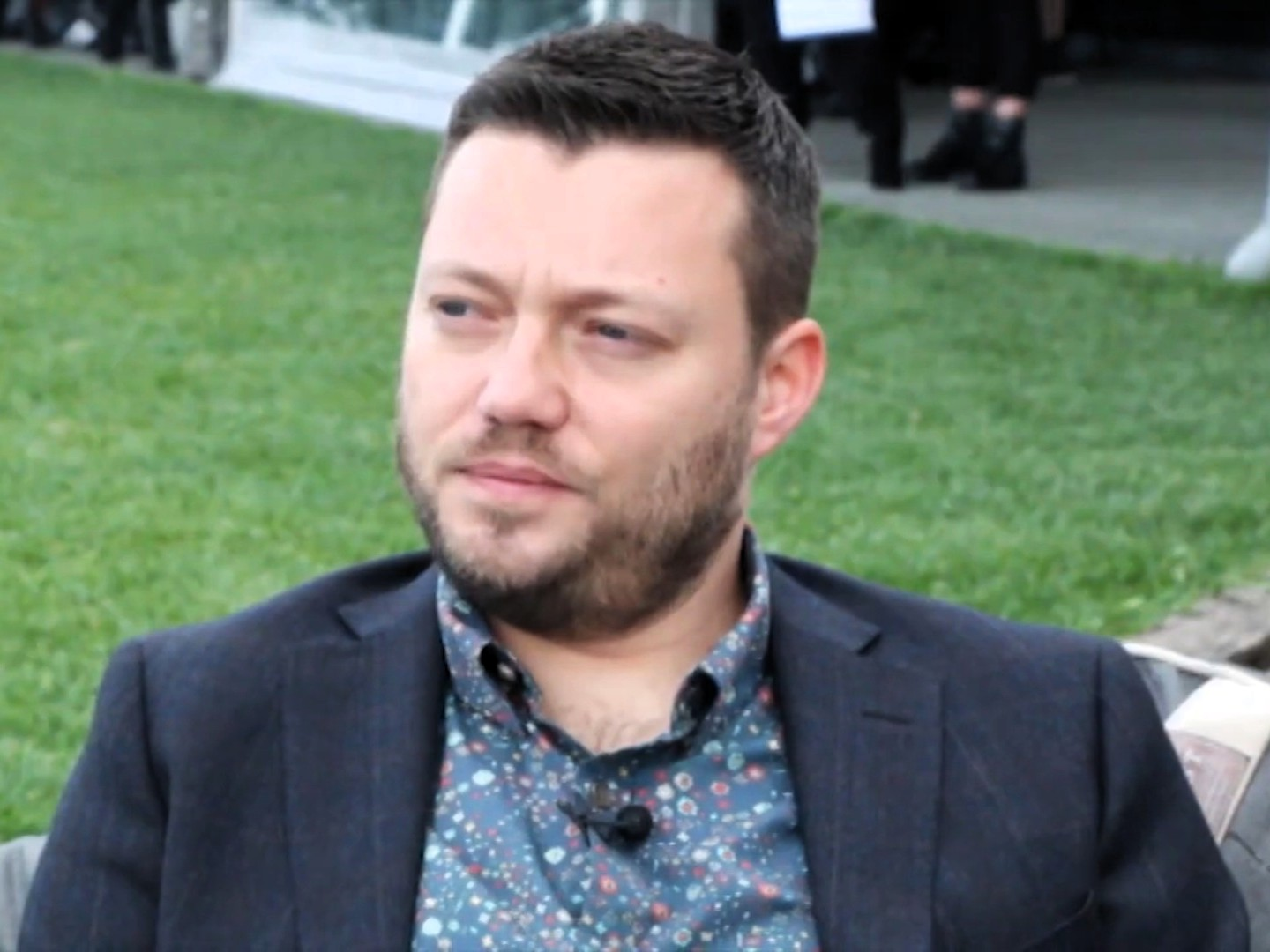
Southon in 2018

Mark Southon is an English-born New Zealand celebrity chef and television personality originally from Manchester, England. He was previously the resident chef for the New Zealand morning TV Show The Cafe, which aired from 2016 until 2020.

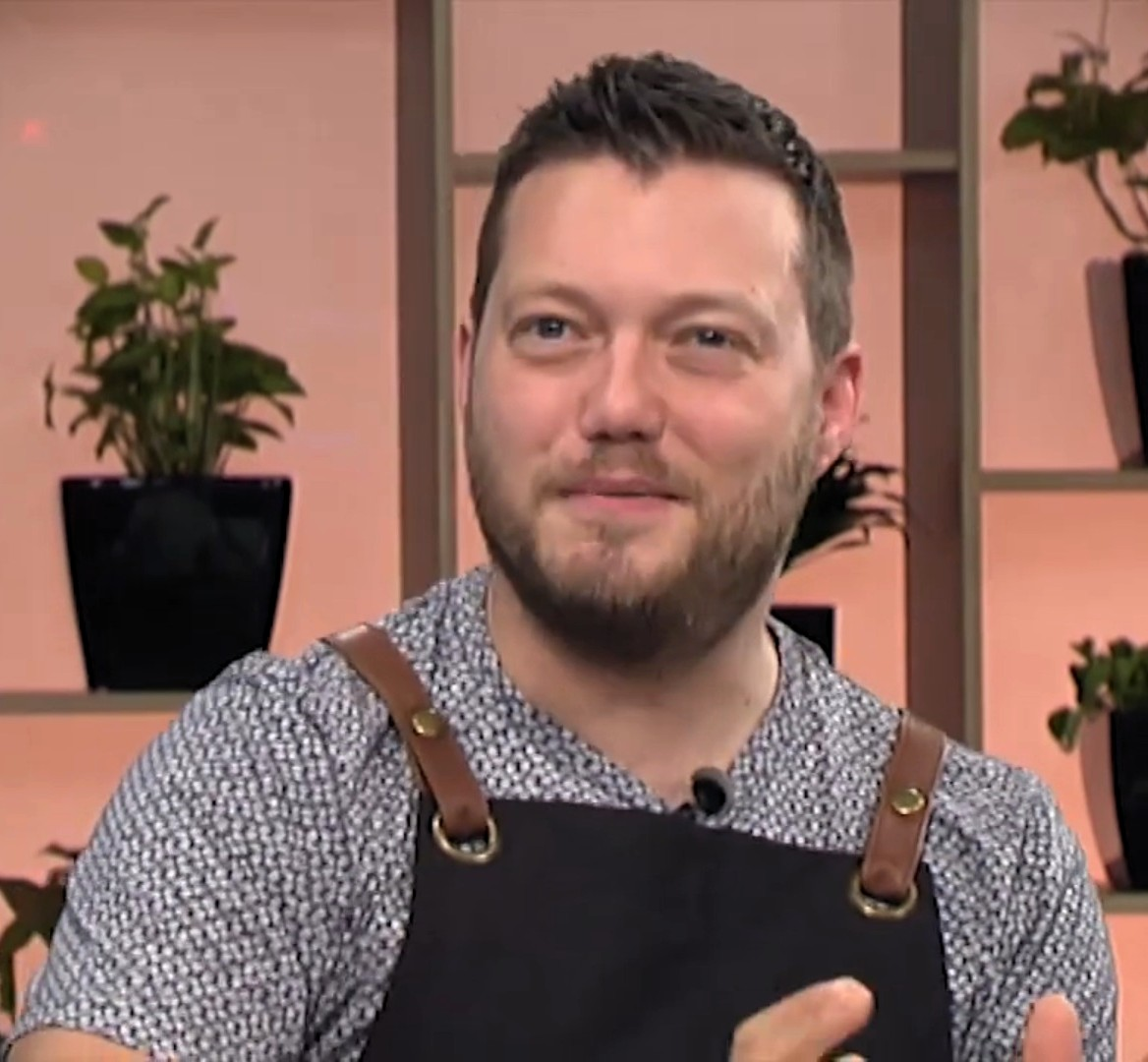
Southon in 2018

In 2022, he participated in season 1, episode 6 of Snack Masters, where he had to replicate Eta's Ripple chips and Onion Dip. He was introduced as the former Head Chef of The French Cafe, O Connell's Bistro and Wai Restaurant. In 2023, Southon appeared in the New Zealand television series, Clubhouse Rescue.

He is the Head Chef of Etheral Restaurant in Double Tree by Hilton Karaka.
