= Nobby's =

Australian nut brand

Nobby's is Australia's largest nuts brand, manufactured by The Smith's Snackfood Company, the Australian snacks division of PepsiCo.

Nobby's products are typically sold in supermarkets as well as pubs. Their Beer Nuts pack claims to have at least 97% Australian ingredients while their peanut pack reports that they are "packed in Australia with less than 10% Australian ingredients".

== Description ==
Nobby's Nuts was founded by Max 'Nobby' Noblet (1913–1995) in the 1950s.

The brand is sold with a memorable double entendre tagline, "Nibble Nobby's nuts". It began to be advertised on Australian television in the 1980s, using a combination of real-life and animated scenes.

The Nobby's brand was introduced to the UK and Ireland in 2005, launching a distinctive range of nuts and crisps products targeting male consumers. The UK range is positioned as "Fun, blokey and all about flavour, Nobby's is a range of Peanuts and Cashews that delivers straightforward satisfaction with a distinctive sense of humour." British advertising featured musician Noddy Holder, of the rock band Slade, frustrated that pub-goers misheard the brand name for himself. The advert was only shown after the 9:00 pm watershed due to its risqué humour.

== See also ==
- List of snack foods by country
