= Jamie Southon =

English footballer

Personal information
- Full name: Jamie Peter Southon
- Date of birth: 13 October 1974 (age 52)
- Place of birth: Dagenham, England
- Position: Midfielder

Youth career
- Norwich City
- 1989–1992: Southend United

Senior career*
Years	Team	Apps	(Gls)
1992–1993	Southend United	1	(0)
	Purfleet	10	(2)
1994	Stevenage Borough	3	(1)
- Purfleet
	Dagenham & Redbridge	6	(0)
- Grays Athletic
- Sing Tao
- Grays Athletic
1996–1997	Chelmsford City	28	(7)
1997	Enfield	0	(0)
1997–2003	Purfleet	273	(20)
2003–2005	Hornchurch		
2004	→ St Albans City (loan)	5	(0)
2005	Cambridge City	16	(1)
2005–2006	Chelmsford City (loan)	11	(0)
2006–2009	AFC Hornchurch	121	(8)
- Mountnessing
- Kelevdon Hatch
- * Club domestic league appearances and goals

Jamie Peter Southon (born 13 October 1974) is an English footballer who played as a midfielder.

== Career ==
After joining Southend United's youth academy from Norwich City, Southon made one solitary appearance for Southend, coming in the 1992–93 season. Following his time with Southend, Southon dropped into Non-League football, playing for Purfleet, Stevenage Borough, Dagenham & Redbridge, Grays Athletic before joining Sing Tao in Hong Kong. Upon his return to England, Southon rejoined Grays, before signing for Chelmsford City in November 1996. In July 1997, Southon joined Enfield, leaving the club for Purfleet in September 1997. Over the course of six seasons, Southon made 283 appearances, scoring 22 times. In February 2003, signed for Hornchurch. In June 2005, following the liquidation of Hornchurch, Southon signed for Cambridge City. After 23 appearances in all competitions at Cambridge, Southon joined Chelmsford for a second spell. In 2006, Southon joined Hornchurch's phoenix club AFC Hornchurch.

Southon later played for Essex Olympian League side Kelvedon Hatch.

Jamie is now a first team coach at Hornchurch FC.
