= Snackbrands Australia =

Australian company

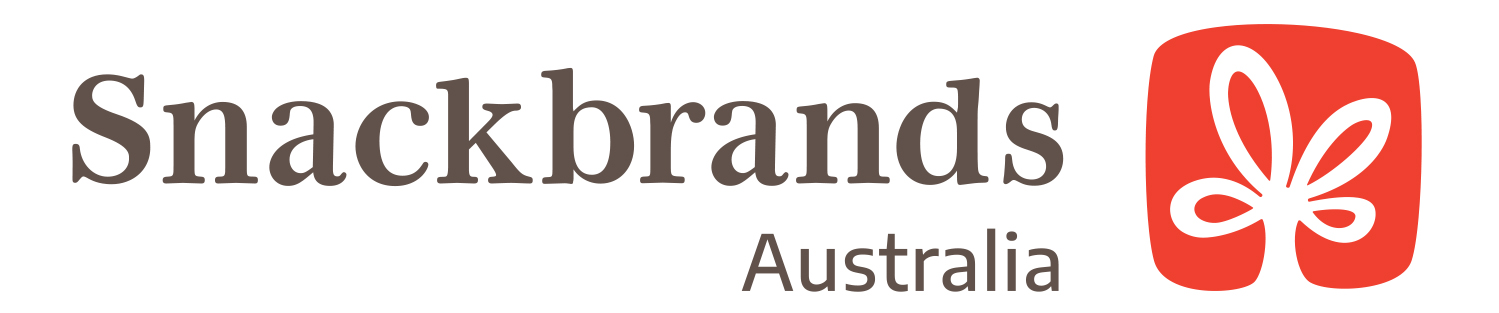
- Industry: Food
- Founded: 1998 (27 years ago)
- Headquarters: Norwest, Sydney, Australia
- Key people: Kurt Preshaw
- Products: Chips and corn snacks
- Brands: CC's; Thins; Cheezels; Samboy
- Parent: Intersnack
- Website: snackbrands.com.au

Snackbrands Australia (SBA) is one of the largest suppliers of snack foods in Australia and acts as the main competitor to the long established The Smith's Snackfood Company.

The company was founded in August 1998 as a subsidiary of parent company Snack Foods Limited, with main product lines including Kettle, Cheezels, Natural Chip Co and Thins. The company was acquired by Philippines food and beverage company Universal Robina in 2016 for AUD$600 million (US$461 million) and it is currently owned by the German snack food company Intersnack. The company has more than 400 employees, with Kurt Preshaw as chief executive officer, in which the company had US$248.95 million in revenue in 2021–22. Their headquarters office is in Norwest, Sydney, Australia.

== History ==
In 1998, The Smith's Snackfood Company was acquired by Frito-Lay (a subsidiary of PepsiCo). Because these were the two largest producers of salty snack foods in Australia, Frito-Lay agreed with the Australian Competition & Consumer Commission to divest a range of brands to ensure adequate competition.

Additionally, several manufacturing facilities were released including plants in South Australia, New South Wales and Victoria. This package was named 'Snack Brands Australia' and was sold to Dollar Sweets Holdings.

In September 2012, Snackbrands became an associated member of the Roundtable on Sustainable Palm Oil (RSPO).

In 2016, Philippine food and beverage company Universal Robina Corporation (URC) acquired Snack Brands Australia for A$600 million (US$461 million), including its entirety of product lines and the two existing manufacturing facilities located in Smithfield and Blacktown in Sydney, Australia. The acquisition process spawned from Snack Brands compounded annual growth rate of 7.4% over the previous 4 years.

Later in 2016, Snackbrands Australia merged with 40-year-old company New World Foods in attempt to extend the growth and share of the rapidly expanding brand. This included the acquisition of Local Legends Jerky, which were distributed throughout Australia, Asia and the United Kingdom.

In 2018, plans were approved for the development of a new $200 million distribution centre for Snackbrands Australia in Erskine Park, Sydney. Private equity real estate investor Altis Property Partners were recruited to develop the 30,255 square metre logistics facility designed for automated robotics and technology to store and retrieve items. The high bay facility will be leased for an initial 20 years upon its forecasted completion in late 2020. The development and construction process of the 10.42 hectare plant is managed by TM Insight, a global supply chain and property consultancy. It was one of the largest industrial property deals in the 2018 financial year. 74 The end value of the facility was projected at $400 million.

In December 2019, URC and German company Intersnack formed Unisnack ANZ, a joint venture comprising Snack Brands Australia and Griffin's Foods. Intersnack held a 40% stake in the consolidated business. In August 2021, URC exited the Australian and New Zealand market by selling its remaining 60% stake in Unisnack ANZ to Intersnack.

== Products ==
Snackbrands headquarters is located in Norwest, with an original manufacturing site in Smithfield, and a new manufacturing site in Orchard Hills, New South Wales, Sydney, Australia. The company used to also have a manufacturing facility in Blacktown, however this site closed in early 2025, with Smithfield due to close in late 2025, leaving the flagship site at Orchard Hills as the sole manufacturing site in Australia. These facilities produce approximately 200 million packets per annum. Product lines include:

- CC's
- Thins
- Kettle
- The Natural Chip Co.
- The Natural Cracker Co.
- Cheezels
- French Fries
- Jumpy’s
- Samboy
- Chickadees
- Tyrrells (crisps)

== Sustainability ==
=== Roundtable on Sustainable Palm Oil (RSPO) ===
In September 2012, Snackbrands became an associated member of the Roundtable on Sustainable Palm Oil (RSPO). RSPO is a transnational non-profit organisation established to encourage, develop and advance the attainment, production, funding and practise of sustainable palm oil products.

In 2013, Snackbrands made a publicised commitment to use 100% RSPO certified sustainable palm oil in all manufactured products by 2020, which has been fulfilled; predominantly in the production of Kettle Chips. In October 2014, they began supply of 100% RSPO certified sustainable palm oil in procurement via the “mass balance” methodology.

In February 2015, Snackbrands owned Australian manufacturing sites underwent a RSPO certification audit for Segregated Palm oil and gained certification. This certification was integrated into the development of the $200 million distribution centre in 2018, with annual audits from RSPO.

In 2019, Snackbrands used a total volume of 8,560 tonnes of crude and refined palm oil, 100% of which is RSPO certified sustainable.
