= Snack Foods Limited =

Australian snack food company

Snack Foods Limited is an Australian snack food company and was officially formed on 25 November 1999, and was owned by Arnott's Biscuits Limited, a subsidiary of the American Campbell Soup Company. Snack Foods Limited owns one of Australia's largest salted snack food companies, Snack Brands Australia. In April 2008, Campbell Arnott's sold Arnott's Snackfoods to The Real McCoy Snackfood Co and the company is now known as Snack Brands Australia.

== Background ==
Snack Foods Limited was formerly known as Dollar Sweets Holding Limited until it changed its name on 25 November 1999. Campbell announced its intent to acquire Snack Foods Limited on 4 June 2002, and offered A$2.00 per share, acquiring over 90% of the company. Under Australian corporate law, once a company acquires 90% of a public company, it is entitled to acquire the remaining outstanding shares regardless of whether they are tendered into the offer. The total takeover cost approximately $255 million and each shareholder received a dividend of 2.5 cents per share from Snack Foods Limited.

Snack Foods Limited had approximately $125 million (USD) in sales in 2001, and has constantly grown 8% annually since.

With Arnott's acquisition of Snack Foods Limited it became Australia's second largest producer of Australian salty snack foods after the long established British Australian company The Smith's Snackfood Company.

== Dollar Sweets court case ==
In 1985 there was a landmark Supreme Court case involving Dollar Sweets. The case represented a rare occasion in which a common law verdict was used to resolve an industrial dispute despite the existence of specialist industrial courts.

In early 1985 award negotiations broke down between the Victorian branch of Dollar Sweets and the Confectionery Workers Union, over the issue of a 36-hour working week and a requirement that workers sign a no-strike agreement. A number of workers were sacked during negotiations, and the Union immediately set up a picket line. The picket line remained for 143 days, with the company refusing to reinstate the workers and seeking common law damages against the union. A number of bomb and arson threats were made against Dollar Sweets and one strike-breaking driver was assaulted and his truck vandalised.

Dollar Sweets was represented in the Victorian Supreme Court by Melbourne barrister Peter Costello and the case was financed by the Victorian Chamber of Commerce. The company alleged union interference with contractual relations, intimidation, nuisance, and a conspiracy to injure the plaintiff and sought an injunction and punitive damages. The ACTU also publicly condemned the strike action, saying the CWU's 36-hour claim was "outside the Accord".

In December 1985 Victorian Supreme Court Justice Peter Murphy gave judgement, describing the picketing as "stupid and nihilistic." He ruled that this was not a "lawful form of picketing, but a... nuisance involving obstruction, harassment, and besetting". It was beside the point that there were specialist courts for industrial disputes. "This court is not without power ... and should intervene". He issued an interlocutory injunction against the picket, and ordered the union to pay $175,000 in damages.
