= Cheezels =

Australian snack food

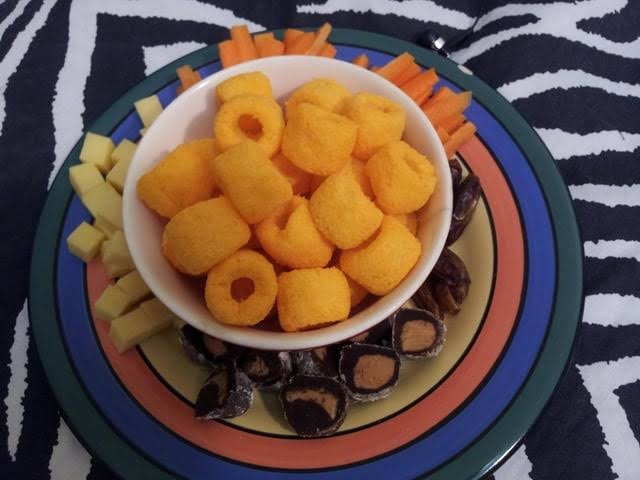
- Cheezels in a bowl.
- Product type: Cheese puffs
- Current owner: Snack Brands Australia
- Introduced: 1971; 55 years ago
- Markets: Oceania
- Previous owners: Malaysia: Danone; Kraft Foods
- Registered as a trademark in: Snack Brands Australia (Australia); Cheezels; Mondelēz International (Malaysia); Cheezels
- Ambassador: Samuel Wilden
- Tagline: Finger-Licious Fun! (Australia)
- Website: www.snackbrands.com.au/Cheezels

Cheezels (Original Cheese flavour)
Nutritional value per 100 g (3.5 oz)
- Energy: 2,220 kJ (530 kcal)
- Carbohydrates: 56.4 g
- Sugars: 4.9 g
- Dietary fibre: 1 g
- Fat: 30.9 g
- Saturated: 14.9 g
- Trans: 0.4 g
- Monounsaturated: 11.6 g
- Polyunsaturated: 4.0 g
- Protein: 6.9 g
Vitamins and minerals
Minerals	Quantity %DV^{†}
Potassium	4% 114 mg
Sodium	52% 1200 mg
- ^{†}Percentages estimated using US recommendations for adults, except for potassium, which is estimated based on expert recommendation from the National Academies.

Cheezels are a brand of Australian snack food currently produced by Snack Brands Australia. Made from corn and rice, they are a crisp puffy ring with a strong, savoury cheddar cheese flavour and aroma. Due to the ring structure of the snack itself, Cheezels are often eaten off of the consumers fingers. They are similar in texture to cheese puffs, American Cheetos, or Canadian Cheezies.

In some countries they are distributed by Laura Matte (which since 2016 has been owned by Universal Robina Corporation, and previously by The Real McCoy Snackfood Company). In Malaysia, Cheezels were originally produced by Danone and later by Kraft Foods, and are currently owned by Mondelēz International, together with Twisties. In New Zealand, Cheezels are manufactured by Bluebird Foods Ltd a PepsiCo company, which is a competitor to Snack Brands Australia, the manufacturer of Cheezels in Australia.

The New Zealand version of Cheezels are not as crisp in texture or as strong cheddar cheese flavour as their Australian counterpart.

Cheezels are a highly popular snack in Australia, selling over 18.2 million packets in 2025.

== History ==
According to any modern packet of Cheezels, the snack entered the market in 1971. Company folklore has it that the creative team were stuck for a name when the boss chipped in with "Just call 'em Cheezels". One account credits the brand name to Ken Farrington (an account executive at the advertising agency Masius, which worked with snack companies around 1970).

As of 2017 Cheezels are gluten free.

== Flavours ==
Usually, Cheezels are made from corn and rice, and many kinds of powdered cheeses. Other flavours of the snack have been produced by Snack Brands Australia, such as:

- Original Cheese
- Chicken
- Pizza
- Cheese & Bacon
- Hoops & Crosses Burger Flavour
- Minis - miniature versions of Cheezels
- Chilli Cheese
- Salt & Vinegar
- Burger Hoops
- Barbecue

== See also ==
- Twisties
- Cheetos
