= Samboy =

Australian brand of potato crisps

Samboy (Snackfood) is a brand of crinkled potato chips released in Australia. It is owned by Snack Brands Australia.

The most popular flavours are Chicken, Original, Salt & Vinegar, Atomic Tomato and BBQ.

== History ==
Samboy Chips were originally produced and distributed by Norm and Ed Meyer in the 1950s.

In the 1960s Samboy chips were not crinkle cut and only came in barbecue flavour. In the 1980s, the "Original" (ready salted) flavour was called "Samboy Gold".

The brand is best remembered by its 1980s advertising campaign that stated “Samboy: The flavour really hits you”. One ad featured a man on a bicycle delivering chips to various people. He would hit the front brake at the last moment, performing an 'endo' as he came to an abrupt stop. He'd then present the pink bag of "Salt and Vinegar Samboy" chips, before immediately cycling off hastily, pulling a 'mono' as he left. The confused customer would then be drenched in a huge amount of salt and vinegar falling from the sky. Subsequent deliveries would see recipients hit by falling giant chickens and flattened by a solid brick BBQ, representing the different flavours available.

An advertising campaign during the 1990s included the slogan "Hit me with a Samboy chip", with the television commercial featuring a variety of Australian celebrities furthering the slogan to "hit me slowly, hit me quick, hit me, hit me, hit me", imitating the song Hit Me With Your Rhythm Stick by Ian Dury & The Blockheads.

In 2003-2004 Arnotts discontinued the 'Atomic Tomato' flavour.

In late 2008 the brand was reintroduced after being acquired by Snack Brands Australia due to demand from groups on the social networking site Facebook. Original, BBQ, Chicken, Salt & Vinegar as well as Atomic Tomato were the flavours re-released.
