= Twisties =

Australian snack food

- The present Twisties logo
- Product type: Cheese curl
- Current owner: The Smith's Snackfood Company
- Introduced: 1950; 76 years ago
- Markets: Oceania; Southeast Asia
- Previous owners: Australia: Twistie Corporation; Darrell Lea; General Foods Corporation; Malaysia: Danone; Kraft Foods
- Registered as a trademark in: The Smith's Snackfood Company (Australia); Twisties; Goodman Fielder (Fiji & Papua New Guinea); Twisties; Mondelēz International (Malaysia and Europe); Twisties; Lay's (Thailand); Twisty ('ทวิสตี้' in Thai); Frito-Lay; PepsiCo
- Tagline: Life's pretty straight without... (Australia); Life is fun with... (Pacific Islands)
- Website: smiths.com.au/brands/twisties

Twisties (Cheese flavour)
Nutritional value per 100 g (3.5 oz)
- Energy: 2,050 kJ (490 kcal)
- Carbohydrates: 61.9 g
- Sugars: 5.8 g
- Dietary fibre: 1.5 g
- Fat: 23.5 g
- Saturated: 11.4 g
- Protein: 7.1 g
Vitamins and minerals
Minerals	Quantity %DV^{†}
Potassium	17% 504 mg
Sodium	39% 908 mg
- ^{†}Percentages estimated using US recommendations for adults, except for potassium, which is estimated based on expert recommendation from the National Academies.

Twisties are a type of cheese curl corn-based snack food product, available mainly in Australia and other Oceanian countries. In Europe they are marketed as Fonzies, and in France as "Belin Croustilles". It was launched in 1950 by the General Foods Corporation. The brand name is owned by The Smith's Snackfood Company.

While originally an Australian-owned company, Smith's was acquired in August 1998 by Frito-Lay, which in turn is owned by American multi-national PepsiCo. In Malaysia, Twisties is a product of Mondelēz International, after having been a part of Danone and later, Kraft Foods previously. In Thailand, the Twisties trademark is owned by Lay's, which, like The Smith's Snackfood Company, is owned by PepsiCo.

== History ==
In the early 1950s, Melbourne businessman Isador Magid imported a rotary head extruder from the United States which initially did not work. After bringing out a technical expert from the US as well as receiving valuable advice from the CSIRO, Magid started producing Twisties. The product was popular but large scale distribution was difficult so Magid decided to sell the machine and the brand in 1955 to Monty Lea from Darrell Lea for £12,000. Monty and his brother Harris experimented with the machine further using rice and various flavourings. Twisties became popular in Australia - some of its early success is attributed to promotional activity that included advertising the product on Graham Kennedy and Bert Newton's TV show In Melbourne Tonight, making it one of the earliest products advertised on that program. After an unsuccessful attempt to launch Twisties in the UK and competition for shelf space in Australia the Lea brothers agreed to sell the Twisties brand to the Smith's Snackfood Company.

During the late 1990s the Twisties brand went through a brand overhaul, coinciding with the acquisition of The Smith's Snackfood Company by Frito-Lay. During the brand overhaul the appearance of the packet was changed to a more modernised look, adopting its current logo. As well as this, the texture of the snack itself was altered, resulting in a smoother finish.

Twisties were originally available only in 'Cheese' flavour, but 'Chicken' and 'Wicked Cheddar Zig-Zag' flavours were later introduced and became a standard part of the product line. There have also been flavours abroad as diverse as 'Toffee', 'Tomato', 'Salmon Teriyaki' and 'Peri Peri', where the local palate suits them the most.

Twisties are eaten as a snack in themselves, or sometimes in a sandwich as a "Twistie buttie" or "Twisties roll", by serving the packet contents between two slices of buttered bread or in a roll.

In 1997, a Twisties batch was recalled after reports of consumers finding pieces of fine wire in packs, there were no reports of injuries. The company thought that the wire resulted from machinery malfunction. In 2014, Twisties were one of the products removed from shops in Malaysia due to concerns around contamination from pork products.

In 2001, Frito-Lay lost a trademark dispute with Aldi Stores, as Aldi's 'Chazoos' cheese twists were not considered to infringe on the registered trademark of Twisties on the basis of packaging, extrusion production or the sound of the product name. Aldi won the appeal as they argued that the phrase 'Cheezy Twists' described their product contents and was not used as their registered trademark.

In 2009, Twisties packets reduced in size from 50 grams to 45 grams, with the company choosing to reduce portion size rather than increase retail prices due to higher costs for raw materials. Later that year, consumer group Choice flagged Twisties as a product which had shrunk but retained the same retail price in a shinier, re-designed packet containing less Twisties.

In 2011, comedian Danny McGinlay hosted an experimental cooking comedy show for the Adelaide Fringe. His show, 'Food Dude: recipes for disaster' featured 'Aussie sushi' which contained beetroot and Twisties.

In 2014, a trio of hikers lost overnight in Lerderderg State Park were sustained by half a bag of Twisties. After the snack was finished, bushwalker Kirrilee Ord turned the Twisties packet inside out and attempted to use the reflective side to signal rescue helicopters. This effort was unsuccessful, but the group was later found by a search party.

Chef Adriano Zumbo has created a lime and cheese Twisties zumbaron, which is a cheesy Twisties-flavoured macaron with lime filling.

== Ingredients and manufacturing process ==
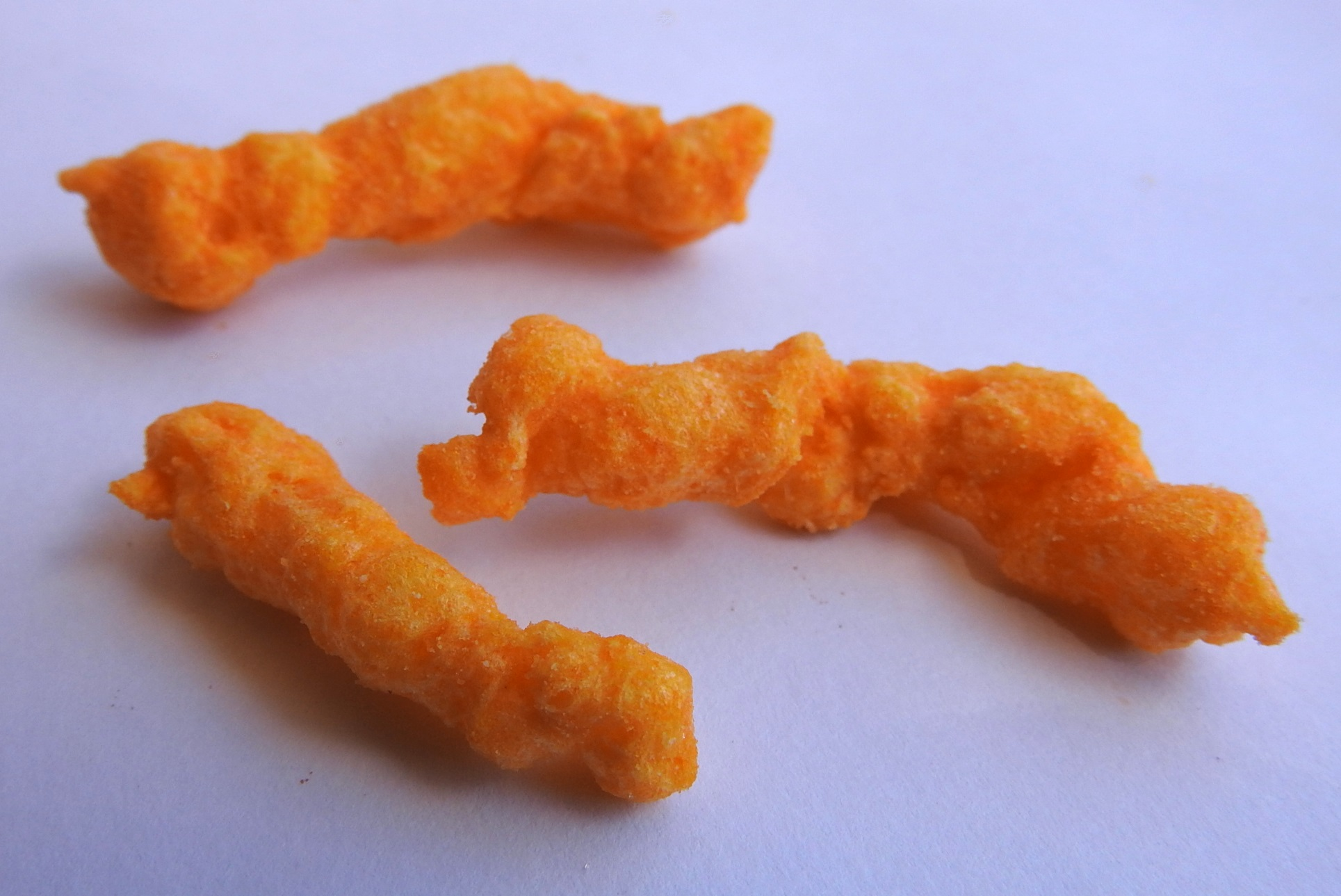
Smith's Twisties snacks

Since the snack's creation, its base ingredient has been ground corn, rice and agar. Other base ingredients standard in every flavour are vegetable oil, whey protein, salt, and monosodium glutamate (E621) as a flavour enhancer. Ingredients differ depending on the variety of Twisties.

Wendyl Nissen's review of packaged food noted that Twisties are a bit better than other super market snacks because the cheese flavouring is sourced from milk solids rather than chemical flavourings.

In 2011, The Herald Sun highlighted that Twisties contain not only MSG itself, but also HVP (hydrolysed vegetable protein) which is a source of MSG.

- The ingredients for Cheese flavour are as follows, in order of percentage of product: corn and rice cereal, vegetable oil, whey powder, cheese powder, monosodium glutamate (E621), salt, hydrolyzed vegetable protein, flavour, yeast extract, potassium chloride, cream powder, milk powder, natural colouring (paprika extract and carotene), lactic acid.

The Twisties mixture is made by heating, shearing and pressurising corn, semolina, rice grits and water in a rotary head or random extruder, also known as the 'Twisties Press'. When the liquid mixture is passed through a hole between a spinning plate and a stationary plate, it expands, cools and solidifies to make characteristic knobbly surfaced, squiggly Twisties. A metal lug cuts the mixture into lengths. After forming, the pieces are oven baked before being flavoured with a coating of vegetable oil and a dusting of powdered whey, cheese powder, salt, monosodium glutamate, lactic acid and two types of food colouring. Factory seconds are sometimes fed to farm animals.

== Flavours ==
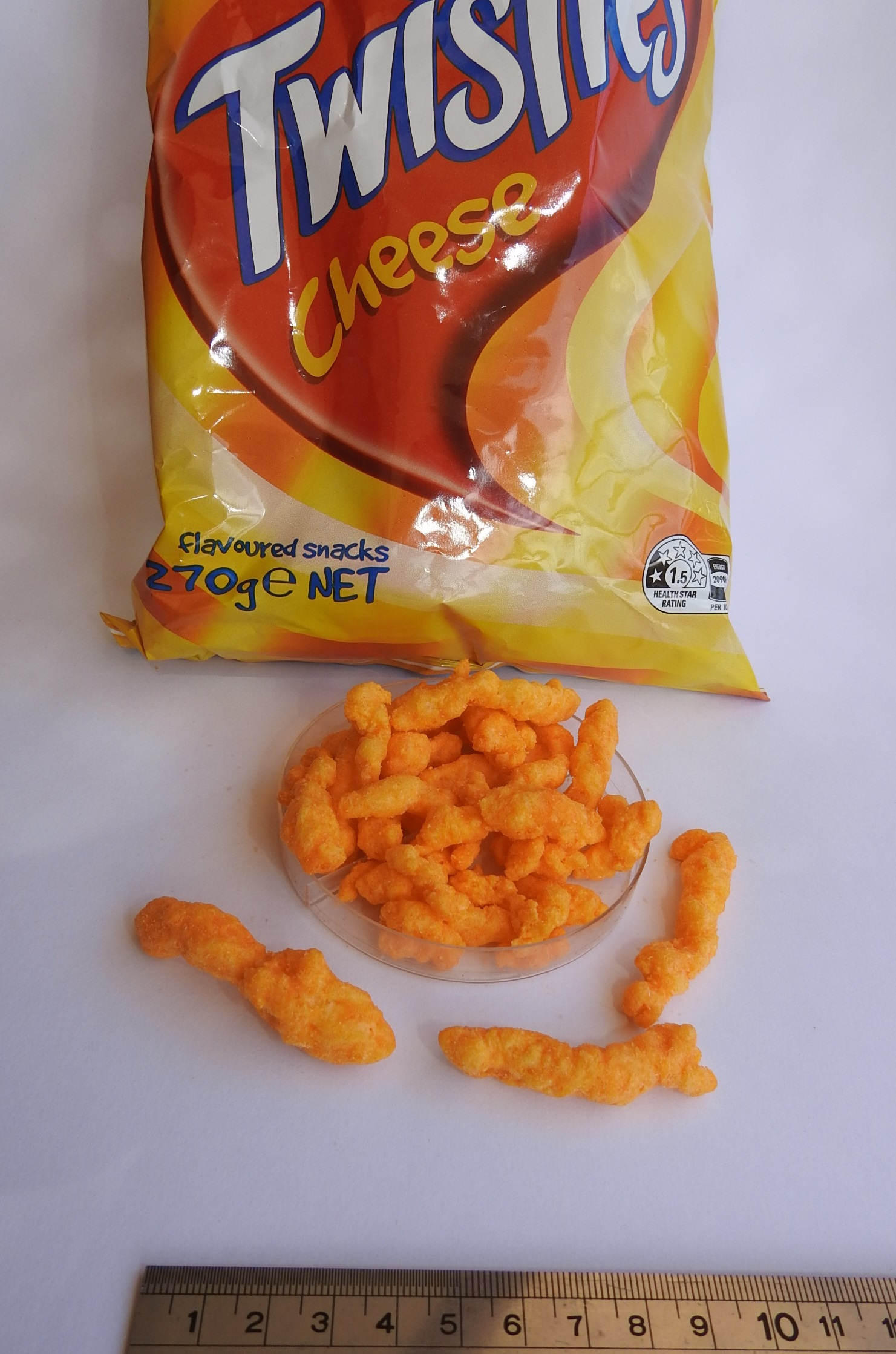
Smith's Twisties packet and some cheese-flavoured twisties (with centimetre ruler)

Twisties has a large variety of flavours which are sold in Australia, and in the different islands. Of these are the main flavours 'Cheese' and 'Chicken', found in any country that sells them. The islands have a more diverse selection of flavours available normally, however Australia experiences more limited edition flavours. This is due to The Smith's Snackfood Company's aim to "[re-energise] consumers' love for the Twisties brand", according to the company's senior marketing director Jenni Dill.

== Marketing ==
Twisties have been advertised since its last brand overhaul in the late 1990s with the well-known slogan "Life's pretty straight without..." In the English-speaking Oceanic countries where Western vernacular isn't as well understood, its slogan is "Life is fun with..." Typical television advertisements play on the slogan by showing people in mundane situations being transported to surreal and exciting environments when they eat Twisties. Twisties are claimed to be the "number one extruded snack brand" by Smith's.

Twisties, as well as other snack brands owned by The Smith's Snackfood Company, included Oddbodz cards (and later, Space Oddbodz) in specially marked packets for consumers to collect. In late 1996, Oddbodz cards were replaced by Hypa Heads cards, which were available in a 40-card series with a glow-in-the-dark four-image cartoon story requiring a separately purchased Hypervision Viewer. In 2002, Tazo-like (pog-like collectible cardboard discs) Simpsons-themed 'Pickers' discs were included in Twisties packets (as well as other Smith's brands Lay's and Cheetos), which had a velcro backing and could be picked up from the ground with a branded Pickers Bungee Ball. Other branded inclusions were related to Yu-Gi-Oh!, and other popular franchises. This could be attributed to Twisties' success.

Advertising for the snack has almost completely stopped in the last decade in comparison to its past promotions. Twisties' largest (and most expensive) campaign ever was between 1982-1983 with its "Twisties jumper" campaign. Lillian Darrell, a previously unknown actor, played the role of an old woman knitting a Twisties jumper straight from a sheep. The promotion included free knitting patterns and free bags of Twisties. Other promotions were attempted afterwards, but they resulted in little success. Currently, Twisties relies heavily on limited edition flavours to keep hype on a profitable level.

In 1986, Fred Nile complained about a Twisties television commercial to the Advertising Standards Council. He alleged that the Viking-themed advertisement used occult imagery and goats' heads and that it would disturb children. The commercial received a record number of 680 complaints alleging that it was "...demonic and harmful to children," but it was noted that many were in similar handwriting. It was removed from television, this was attributed to marketing reasons rather than the pressure groups.

In 1992, Natalie Imbruglia acted in the role of a waitress in a Twisties ad shot at Taronga Zoo. In 2014 while living in London, she said that her mother still posts her packets of Twisties.

In 1995, Twisties was the sole advertising sponsor for the Ten Network's screening of Melrose Place, stating that the two brands worked together as Melrose Place was focused on fantasy and aspiration, and that Twisties are "...fantasy in a pack.". Sponsorship messages were placed at the beginning, middle and end of each episode depicting Melrose Place actors Laura Leighton and Grant Show eating Twisties at home, and Jodie Bissett being served Twisties on a silver platter. Neil Shoebridge criticised the advertisements as being "...flat and lifeless," and relying on gimmickry, but Rochelle Burbury credited them as witty, but that the existing old Twisties "air volley ball" advertisement was a detraction.

Twisties has been credited as one of the "...first packaged good brands..." to launch on the internet in 1995 with its 'Space Girls' advertising campaign.

A later promotion was credited as the 'Space Girls Straighten Twisties' campaign, with television advertisements screened in February 1997. The commercial featured a teenage boy being abducted by female space aliens, as they were interested in his packet of Twisties. The commercials were launched at the same time as the premier of the alien-themed Dark Skies series. The website included 'eyewitness reports' of the abduction and hid clues in a fictitious newspaper, the 'Twisted Examiner'. Visitors could download a Twisties screensaver, video and Windows 95 theme pack. As part of the campaign, from August to October 1997, consumers could win $10,000 if they located a straight Twistie in their Twisties packet. From the 13 million packs in circulation, all of the five straight Twisties were found.

A 1998 advertisement featured Darren Gilshenan of Full Frontal.

=== Unofficial celebrity endorsements ===
In 1998, Brooke Satchwell credited chicken flavour Twisties as the key to VCE success, because they alleviated her car sickness while travelling between her Mornington Peninsula home and the set of Neighbours at Nunawading.

In 2001, Cate Blanchett said that Twisties were what she missed most about Australia, with relatives posting them to her in England.

In 2011, footballer Billy Brownless claimed that cheese Twisties were beneficial for treating a hangover.

In 2013, Chrissy Amphlett said that Twisties were something she missed about Australia.

In 2015, King Gizzard & the Lizard Wizard lead vocalist Stu Mackenzie stated that "Red Bull and Twisties" helped keep the band going on their long tours.

In 2017, Tom Parker Bowles said that chicken Twisties are one of his favourite foods.

== International variants ==
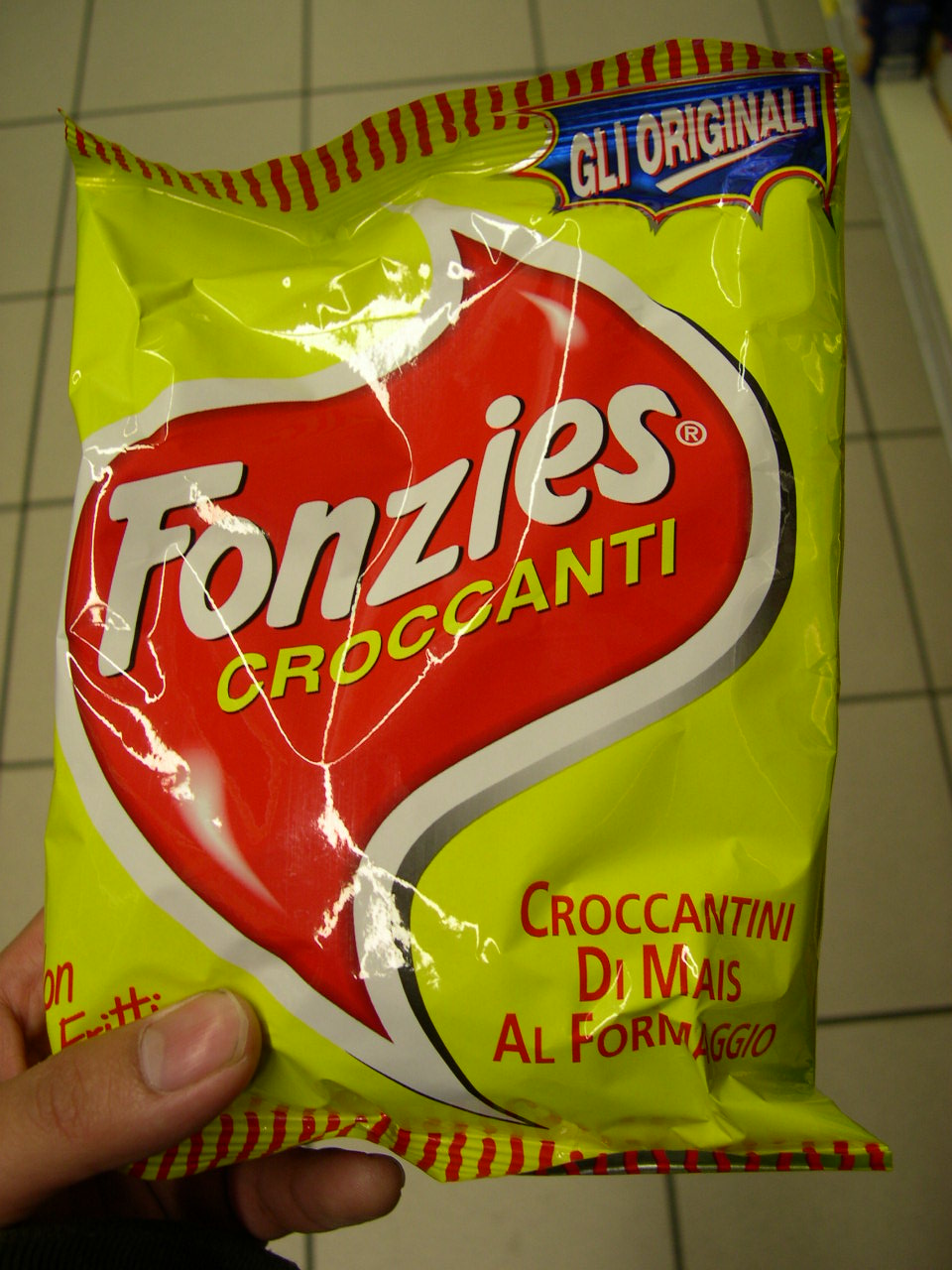
A packet of Fonzies

Twisties in New Zealand are drastically different from the Australian variety in terms of both packet design, marketing and the shape of the cheese curl itself. Called 'twisties' [sic], they are manufactured by Bluebird Foods and are only available in cheese flavour. The packet features a penguin mascot about to throw a cheese curl as if it were a ball, and has a completely different slogan as compared to its Australian counterpart: it being "It's a straight world without Twisties!" They are less dense than the Australian variety, and their shape is more tubular and curvy without imperfections in the shape (Australian Twisties are more jagged and detailed). In New Zealand the Australian variety is not widely available.

Twisties are also sold on the European market with the name 'Fonzies', inspiring its name from the character Arthur Fonzarelli (nicknamed 'Fonzie') from the popular television sitcom Happy Days.
