= Doritos =

American brand of flavored tortilla chips

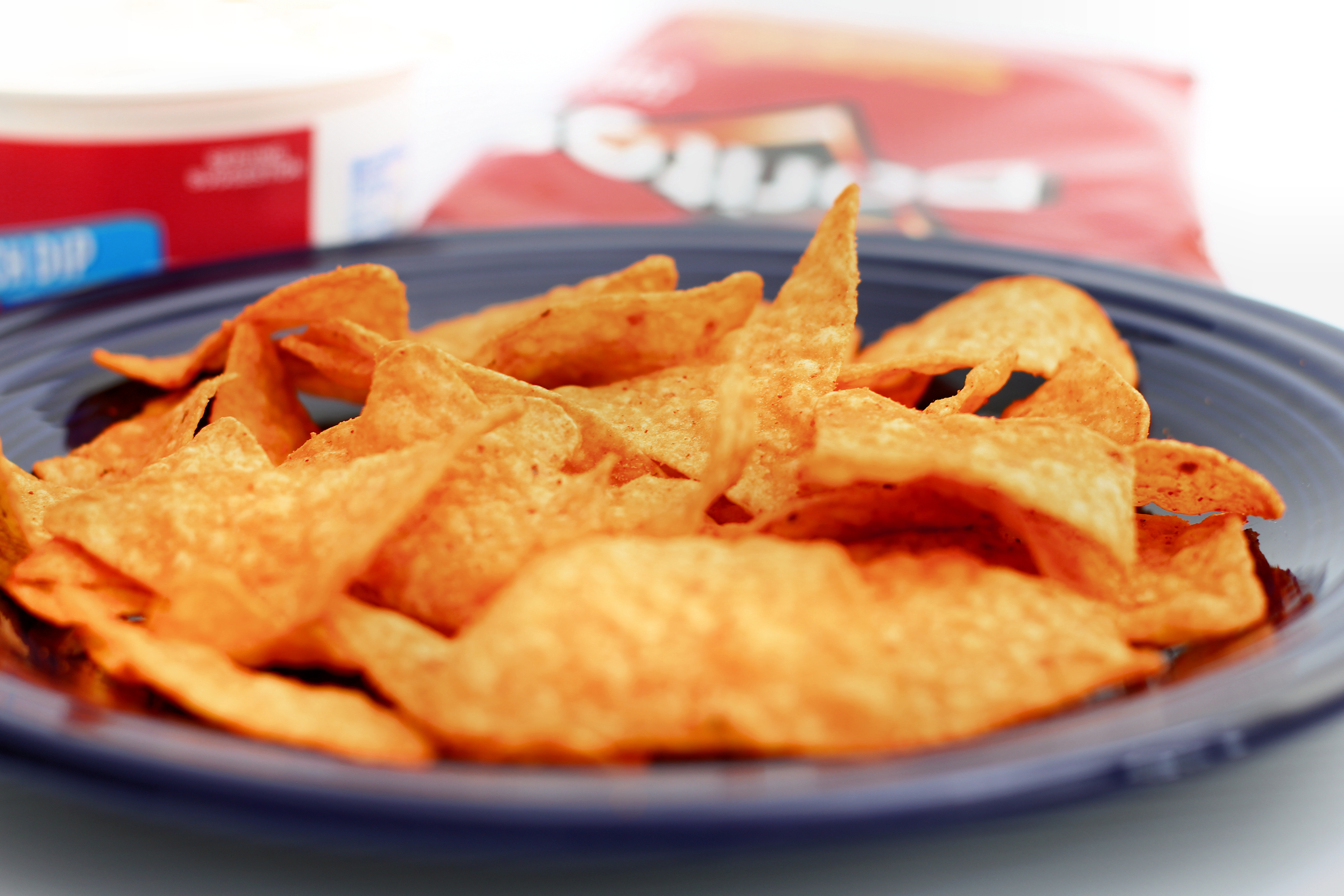
- The current Doritos logo (top); Nacho Cheese Doritos (bottom).
- Product type: Tortilla chip
- Current owner: PepsiCo (via Frito-Lay)
- Country: United States
- Introduced: 1964; 62 years ago (nationwide in 1966)
- Related brands: Lay's; Tostitos; Cheetos
- Markets: International
- Tagline: "Another Level"
- Website: doritos.com

Doritos (/dəˈriːtoʊz/) is an American brand of flavored tortilla chips produced by Frito-Lay, a wholly owned subsidiary of PepsiCo. The concept for Doritos originated at Disneyland at a restaurant managed by Frito-Lay.

In 1966, Doritos became the first tortilla chip available nationally in the United States. The initial flavor was simply toasted corn, followed by taco in 1967, and the now-ubiquitous nacho cheese in 1972. The chips are available worldwide in a wide variety of flavors, differing regionally.

Doritos has also gained notability for its marketing campaigns, including ads aired during Super Bowls. The Doritos brand is also used for similarly seasoned products, like Doritos 3D and taco shells at Taco Bell, where they're used in Doritos Locos Tacos.

== History ==
The term dorito is a contraction of Spanish doradito (little golden [thing]), which is a diminutive of dorado (golden [thing]).

The original product was made at the Casa de Fritos (now Rancho Del Zocalo) at Disneyland in Anaheim, California, during the early 1960s. Using surplus tortillas and taking inspiration from a traditional Mexican snack known as totopo, the company-owned restaurant cut them into smaller pieces, fried them, and added basic seasoning. Arch West was the vice president of marketing of Frito-Lay at the time, and noticed their popularity. He made a deal in 1964 with Alex Foods, the provider of many items for Casa de Fritos at Disneyland, and produced the chips for a short time regionally, before it was overwhelmed by the volume, and Frito-Lay moved the production in-house to its Tulsa plant.

Doritos were released nationwide in 1966, the first tortilla chip to be launched nationally in the United States.

Doritos were introduced in Australia in 1984.

According to Information Resources International, in 1993, Doritos earned $1.2 billion in retail sales, one-third of the total Frito-Lay sales for the year.

The company was sued in 1993 by Charles Grady, who claimed that his throat had been damaged while eating Doritos. According to his lawsuit, the shape and rigidity of the chips made them inherently dangerous. Grady attempted to admit into evidence a study by a former chemistry professor that calculated how best to safely swallow the chips. The Pennsylvania Supreme Court later ruled that the study did not meet scientific standards and could not be presented as evidence.

In the costliest redesign in Frito-Lay history, in 1994 the company spent $50 million to redesign Doritos. Roger J. Berdusco, the vice president of tortilla chip marketing, said a primary reason for the change was "greater competition from restaurant-style tortilla chips, that are larger and more strongly seasoned". The design change was the result of a two-year market research study that involved 5,000 chip eaters. The new design made the chips 20% larger, 15% thinner, and gave each chip rounded corners, making it easier to eat and reducing the scrap resulting from broken corners. Each chip was also given more seasoning, resulting in a stronger flavor. The redesigned chips were released in four flavors beginning in January 1995.

In the United States, Frito-Lay eliminated trans fat from all Doritos varieties in 2002. The same year, the Doritos brand began complying with the Food and Drug Administration labeling regulations, four years before the regulations became mandatory.

In 2005, sales of Doritos in the United States fell by 1.7% to $595 million. To increase sales in 2006, the company launched several new flavors, a new label, and more bilingual advertising. Frito-Lay vice president Joe Ennen described this as "the most significant rebranding and relaunch in Doritos' 38-year history."

On February 21, 2013, the Doritos logo was changed again, and the advertising slogan "for the bold" was adopted.

In 2015, Doritos introduced a limited edition Rainbow Doritos product, which were only available to those making a minimum donation of $10 to the It Gets Better Project, a non-profit organization that supports LGBT youth. The promotion raised $100,000 for the organization, despite some controversy.

== Ingredients ==
The original plain chips (Toasted Corn, a discontinued US variety as of 2019, but available in the UK branded as 'Lightly Salted') are made of ground corn (maize), vegetable oil, and salt. Other ingredients vary across the flavored chip varieties. Doritos made for the US market generally do not use pork-derived animal rennet in the making of the cheese flavorings used on the chip.

- Nacho Cheese Doritos ingredients (U.S.), in order of percent of product: whole corn, vegetable oil (corn, soybean, and/or sunflower oil), salt, cheddar cheese (milk, cheese cultures, salt, enzymes), maltodextrin, whey, monosodium glutamate, buttermilk solids, romano cheese (part skim cow's milk, cheese cultures, salt, enzymes), whey protein concentrate, onion powder, partially hydrogenated soybean and cottonseed oil, corn flour, disodium phosphate, lactose, natural and artificial flavor, dextrose, tomato powder, spices, lactic acid, artificial color (including Yellow 6, Yellow 5, Red 40), citric acid, sugar, garlic powder, red and green bell pepper powder, sodium caseinate, disodium inosinate, disodium guanylate, nonfat milk solids, whey protein isolate, corn syrup solids.

In 1996, The Onion, a satirical newspaper and website, featured an article with the headline "Doritos Celebrates One Millionth Ingredient", lampooning Frito-Lay for the sheer number of ingredients found in Doritos.

Concerns have been raised that the oils, flavorings and additives used in Doritos and other Frito-Lay products may be unhealthy.

== Flavors ==
Doritos are sold in many countries worldwide in assorted flavors. They launched nationally in the United States in 1966, with only one flavor: Toasted Corn. The product proved successful, but additional market research revealed that many consumers outside the Southwest and West considered the chip to be too bland and not spicy enough for what was perceived as a Mexican snack. Frito-Lay therefore developed taco-flavored Doritos, which also became successful after they were introduced nationally in 1967. National distribution of nacho cheese-flavored Doritos began in 1972, and they were also popular. In 1978, Sour Cream and Onion flavored Doritos were introduced, but were discontinued in the early 1980s. A Sesame seed flavored chip was also available for a short time during 1978–79. Around 1985, the original taco flavor recipe was altered to include a sour cream flavoring. In 1986, Cool Ranch Doritos made their debut and also became popular. Cool Ranch Doritos are sold under the name "Cool Original" in the UK and are called "Cool American" elsewhere in Europe, as ranch dressing is less common in those places.

In the 1990s, in partnership with parent company PepsiCo's fast food brands, two new flavors of Doritos were introduced, Taco Bell's Taco Supreme (incorporating a "beef" flavoring that was quite different from the original 1960s "Taco" incarnation) and Pizza Hut's Pizza Cravers. After PepsiCo spun off its restaurant division in 1997, the flavors were simply renamed taco and pizza, respectively, with the pizza flavor discontinued in some markets. At around the same time, due to the popularity of Frito-Lay's Tostitos brand the unflavored Toasted Corn was briefly discontinued, then brought back. In 2008, the Taco Bell (complete with the brand name attached) flavor was temporarily re-released under the "Back by Popular Demand" label along with Four Cheese.

In 1990, Jumpin' Jack Monterey Cheese flavored Doritos were introduced. This flavor was later discontinued. In 1995, Chester's Cheese Doritos were available for a limited time. This flavor introduced the familiar Cheetos flavor cheese on the typical Doritos tortilla chip. In 1997, Spicy Nacho was introduced.

For a brief period in 2004, Doritos introduced new shape and form called "Rollitos", which were corn chips shaped into small tubes, like a regular triangular Dorito was "rolled" up. Rollitos flavors included Nacho Cheesier, Zesty Taco, Cooler Ranch and Queso Picante. In 2013, this idea was reintroduced and rebranded as "Dinamitas", or little sticks of dynamite. There are two varieties, a chili lime combo (similar to Takis Fuego), and the Mojo Criollo (Creole magic), a lemon-lime and garlic flavored rolled Doritos. Dinamitas differs slightly in style than Rollitos. Rollitos had the chips baked, the tube formed with an oil-submersible box press to fry. Currently it is rolled into a tube before the baking and frying, a much simpler process.

Six versions of "Doritos Collisions", which include two different flavors in the same bag, have been produced. Those varieties of Doritos Collisions are Hot Wings/Blue Cheese, Zesty Taco/Chipotle Ranch, Habanero/Guacamole, Cheesy Enchilada/Sour Cream, Pizza Cravers/Ranch, and Blaze/Ultimate Cheddar.

In 2007, Doritos ran a campaign called "Doritos X-13D Flavor Experiment" where black, unidentified bags of Doritos were on the market for consumers to identify and name the flavor. The only flavor identification on these chips was "All American Classic".

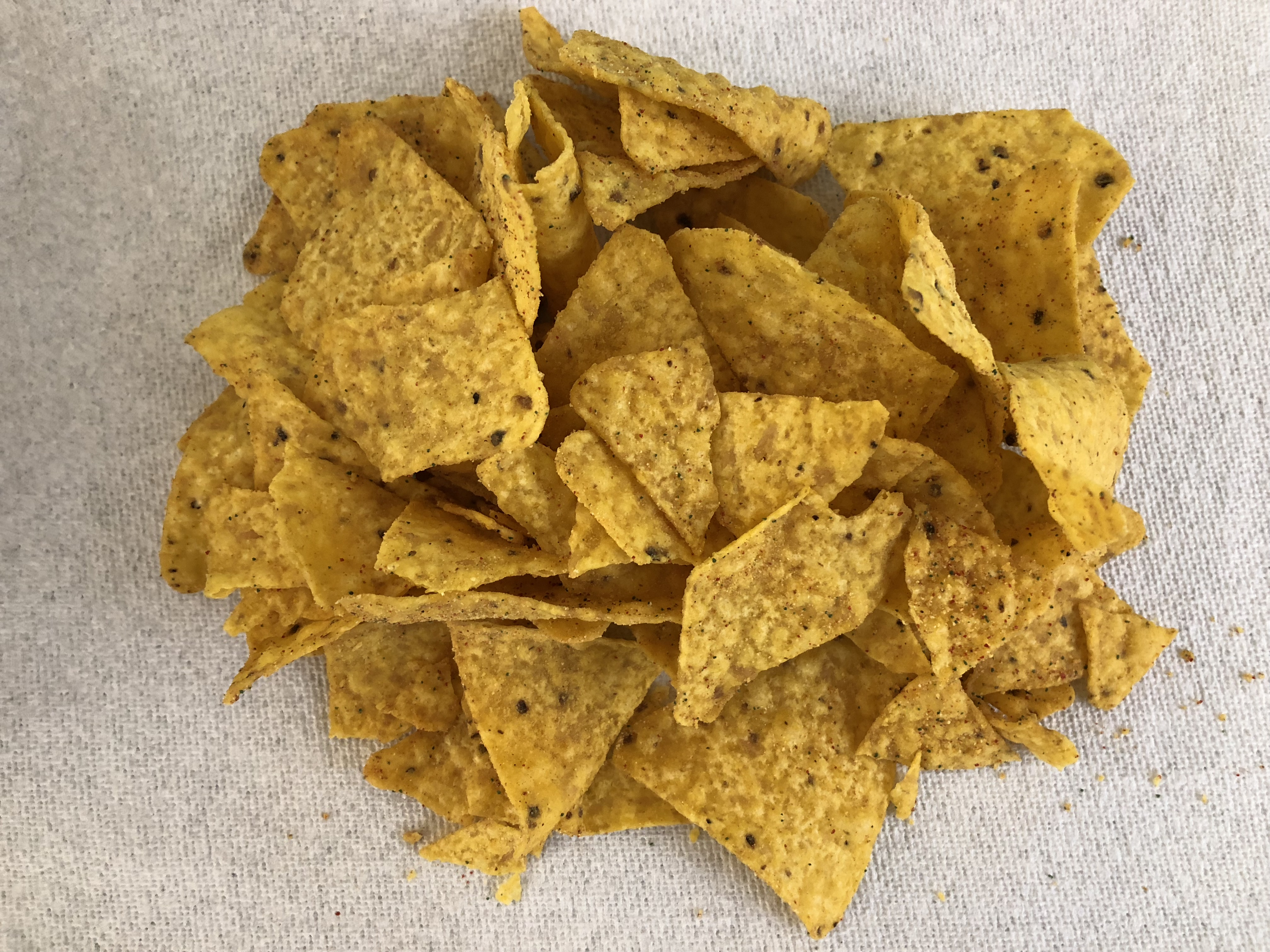
Cool ranch Doritos

Reincarnations and relaunches of taco-flavored Doritos, including the 2008 "Back By Popular Demand" campaign, were different from the original taco flavor (a sour cream flavor had been added to the recipe around 1985). The taco chips included in the Zesty Taco and Chipotle Ranch "Collisions" bags were thought by customers to be closer to the original, but were later discontinued in most of the United States. In late 2010, the modified taco flavor recipe introduced in the mid-1980s returned in a limited edition "retro" styled bag incorporating the original Doritos logo, and in early 2011, Frito-Lay announced that this incarnation would remain in the permanent product line-up.

In 2008, Doritos debuted a "mystery flavor" Quests with prizes being given as puzzles were solved. The mystery flavor was Mountain Dew. In 2009, Doritos released some new flavors under the banner "Doritos Late Night": "Tacos at Midnight" and "Last Call Jalapeño Popper". They also modified the X-13D Flavor as All Nighter Cheeseburger.

2010 saw the release of three successively spicy "Degree Burn" flavors (Blazin' Jalapeño/Jalapeño Fire, Fiery Buffalo and Scorchin' Habanero), cross promoted to "cool down" with Pepsi's lime "Cease Fire/Max Citrus Freeze", and the wasabi-flavored Mr. Dragon's Fire Chips. 2010 saw the introduction of Doritos to New Zealand and with it flavors including Nacho Cheese, Cheese Supreme, Salted, and Salsa.

In the spring of 2011, a Tapatio hot sauce flavor was released. In February 2011, Doritos Canada ran a competition to write the end of a commercial for two new flavors ("Onion Rings n' Ketchup" and "Blazin' Buffalo and Ranch"), and to vote for which of the two flavors would be taken off shelves when the contest ended. Onion Rings n' Ketchup received the most votes and remained on sale.

In the spring of 2015, Doritos Roulette was released to US markets for a limited time. It later returned to store shelves on April 12, 2021. While all chips appeared to look the same on the outside, one out of every six chips would be extra spicy. Owing to the spicy nature of one variety contained in the pack, in July 2015, George Pindar School reported an incident where an asthmatic student "suffered some difficulty breathing after eating one".

On October 6, 2022, Doritos launched two new flavors in the UK inspired by the nation's favorite pizzas, Triple Cheese Pizza and Loaded Pepperoni Pizza flavors were launched and added to the range.

In 2025, Doritos partnered with A Minecraft Movie to release two limited edition flavours, The Ghast BBQ and The Creeper Vinegar.

== Marketing ==
The brand's marketing campaigns have included many television commercials featuring Avery Schreiber, Jay Leno, and Ali Landry, as well as product placement in movies, such as Wayne's World.

=== Super Bowl ===
For many years, Doritos advertised heavily during the Super Bowl. According to Thomas L. Harris's Value-Added Public Relations, "the most-used single video news release of 1995" was a Doritos Super Bowl Commercial featuring recently defeated US state governors Mario Cuomo and Ann Richards. The pair were discussing change and the ad ended with viewers aware that the change they referred to was not political, but rather a new packaging for Doritos. The ad generated a great deal of publicity before it ever ran and much discussion afterward. The governors later parodied their ad; when they were interviewed on the CBS news program 60 Minutes, the two were often seen eating Doritos.

In 1998, Doritos cast former Miss USA Ali Landry in a new Super Bowl Commercial. In the ad, filmed in a Laundromat, she plays a sexy customer who catches Doritos chips in her mouth as they come flying helter-skelter. The ad was such a success that Frito-Lay signed Landry, who became known as "The Doritos Girl," to a three-year contract.

For Super Bowl XLI, Doritos launched a contest, Crash the Super Bowl, to allow consumers to create their own Doritos commercial. The general public was allowed to vote for their favorite of five finalists. According to Doritos, the vote was so close that just before the game the company decided to run two of the ads rather than just one. Both commercials finished highly in ratings of commercials during this Super Bowl. The following year, Doritos sponsored a contest to find a musician to feature in a Super Bowl ad. Although the ad, featuring winner Kina Grannis, generated a lot of publicity, it ranked last in popularity among the program's ads.

For Super Bowl XLIII, Doritos relaunched the fan-created commercials, with the winning vote going to the "Free Doritos" ad, which featured an office worker (portrayed by comedian Steve Booth) with a snow globe (believing it to be a crystal ball) "predicting" that everyone in the office would get free Doritos, then subsequently throws the snow globe into a vending machine selling nothing but Nacho Cheese & Cool Ranch Doritos. The commercial was ranked by the USA Today Super Bowl Ad Meter as the best ad for the year, earning the creators of the ad – Joe and Dave Herbert – a $1 million prize. They again aired two ads during the game ads and the second place ad also placed in the top five according to USA Today. This ad featured a man who discovers that each crunch from his bag of Doritos causes whatever is on his mind to become reality (until he runs out of chips). Another popular commercial from the group of finalist included an executive making a presentation to other executives on a new (fictional) Doritos flavor called "Doritos Beer", which, as the name implies, is beer-flavored Doritos, with each chip containing as much alcohol as an equivalent of a 16-oz. can of beer. The executive making the presentation, eating the beer-flavored chips, ends up drunk on the chips and is down to his underwear and a tie by the end of the commercial. For Super Bowl XLIV, four ads were entered, and if three of the commercials swept the top three positions in that year's Ad Meter contest, all of the creators would be awarded a total of $5 million, broken down as $1 million for first place, $600,000 for second and $400,000 for third, plus each maker would get an additional $1 million.

For the Super Bowl XLIII as aired in Canada, Doritos aired the "Chip Hat" commercial advertising their new "unidentified flavor" chip flavor that offers a prize of CDN $25,000 + 1% of all associated sales to someone that can both name, and create an ad for the new flavor. The new winning name, Scream Cheese (or, in French, Fromage Fracassant), was submitted by Ryan Coopersmith of Montreal.

For the Super Bowl XLIV Doritos aired the "House Rules" commercial, as a "Crash the Super Bowl" finalist. It was ranked by ADBOWL as the second best ad of the year.

For Super Bowl XLVI, an ad aired featuring a Grandma and a baby attempting to get a bag of Doritos by a slingshot activated by a wheelchair. The bag was stolen by a child, constantly teasing them in the process. The baby reaches the bag and steals it back with just enough force to reach it. Flattering the child, Grandma and the baby eat the Doritos with ease.

For Super Bowl XLIX, the ad featured a father offering a large bag of Doritos to his son only if he made pigs fly. The son then proceeded to attach rockets to a pig and the father then gave the bag of Doritos to his son.

=== Other ===
In 2008, Doritos were promoted by an "out-of-this-world" advertising campaign, literally beaming a 30-second advertisement for Doritos brand tortilla chips into a planetary system 42 light years away. The project was in collaboration with EISCAT Space Center in Svalbard, Norway. The "You Make It, We'll Play It" contest chose the winning advertisement that was transmitted on June 12, 2008. The ad was beamed towards 47 Ursae Majoris, a distant star within the Ursa Major constellation that is orbited by planets which may harbor life.

Doritos was the main sponsor of Wolverhampton Wanderers for the 2002/03 and 2003/04 seasons, the latter of which was spent in the Premier League. Doritos officially sponsored the "Hail to the Cheese Stephen Colbert's Nacho Cheese Doritos 2008 Presidential Campaign Coverage." The money given to Colbert could not be used to directly fund his campaign, so he used the money to fund The Colbert Report. He claimed that he would not use his show to plug Doritos, but plugged the chips during these claims. After the campaign flopped, Colbert joked that his "body will stop producing bright orange waste." In March 2008, Colbert partnered with Doritos, specifically the Spicy Sweet Chili flavor, to promote his Philadelphia-based coverage of the Pennsylvania primaries.

In 2010, Doritos Canada launched a "Viralocity" competition, asking the public to name a new flavor and to produce an online video advertising the fictional new flavor. Natalie Armstrong submitted her video, and before long she received the most points based on numerous factors, including most widely viewed, winning a cash prize.

In 2010, Doritos launched for the first time in New Zealand with Nacho Cheese, Cheese Supreme, Salsa, and Salted flavors. It replaced the long-running CC's brand.

On September 20, 2011, retired Frito-Lay marketing executive Arch West, who was credited for creating Doritos as the first national tortilla chip brand, died in Dallas at age 97. It is said that corporate response showed little enthusiasm to the tortilla chip idea, but more marketing research led to the Doritos release.

To coincide with the 50th anniversary of Taco Bell, Doritos and Taco Bell partnered to form the Doritos Locos Tacos, introduced on March 8, 2012. The taco is a standard Crunchy Taco. The taco comes either as a Doritos Locos Taco Supreme (ground beef, lettuce, diced tomatoes, shredded cheese, and sour cream), or a Regular Doritos Locos Taco (ground beef, lettuce, and shredded cheese), but the taco shell is made out of Nacho Cheese Doritos. From 1978 to 1997, both Taco Bell and Doritos were under the same corporate umbrella within PepsiCo until PepsiCo spun off its restaurant business into what would eventually become what is now Yum! Brands.

In March 2012, a new line of Doritos were introduced: Doritos Jacked. The chips are 40% larger than standard Doritos.

In March 2013, Doritos redesigned its packaging and logo as part of its first global marketing campaign. The "For the Bold" campaign will use crowdsourcing initiatives from 37 countries, emphasizing Dorito's focus on its consumers "living for the moment" attitude. The campaign kicked off at the South by Southwest Music Conference.

In April 2013, Doritos released Doritos Locos Chips with Nacho Cheese and Cool Ranch to match Taco Bells campaign. In July 2014, 7-11 released a new snack called Doritos Loaded. The breaded cheese snack was released by PepsiCo's as its first frozen food product, also available in grocery stores.

Current flavors of Doritos (as of November 2014) marketed in Canada are Nacho Cheese, Zesty Cheese, Cool Ranch, Spicy Nacho, Jalapeño Cheddar, Intense Pickle, Roulette (Nacho Cheese with 1 in 7 chips being hot) and Sweet Chili Heat. Brief stints of Jacked, Taco, Guacamole, Locos Nacho (taco and nacho), Locos Cool Ranch (taco and cool ranch) and Ketchup have been introduced with Guacamole lined to make a return in early 2015. Doritos Roasted Corn, Tapatio Hot Sauce, and Salsa Verde are also popular American flavors. Other Lines of Doritos are Doritos Jacked flavors such as Buffalo Wings and Spicy Street Taco and the Dinamita flavor lines shaped in tubes. Dinamita come in flavors such as Chile Limon, Nacho Picoso, and Spicy Habanero flavors.

In January 2017, Doritos entered the Indonesian market. Flavors of Doritos marketed in Indonesia include Nacho Cheese, Barbecue and Roasted Corn, both of which are distributed by Indofood. It was initially imported from Saudi Arabia. From late 2017, it was produced locally by Indofood Fritolay Makmur (currently Indofood Fortuna Makmur) at its factory in Tangerang, Indonesia. In September 2021, Indofood-produced Doritos was renamed to Maxicorn because the license agreement between Indofood Fritolay Makmur and PepsiCo had ended. In March 2025, Doritos was reintroduced in Indonesia, which is currently produced by PT PepsiCo Indonesia Foods and Beverages in Cikarang, Bekasi Regency, West Java, is available in three flavors, Roasted Corn, Salsa, and Nacho Cheese.

In 2025, Doritos released a hunt for square-shaped Doritos chips in collaboration with A Minecraft Movie, and whoever found one would win a prize of up to £10K.

== Doritos 3D ==
Doritos 3D is a line of puffed Doritos originally introduced in 1998 and discontinued in the United States in 2004. These snacks have been described as "Doritos-meets-Bugles". Flavors included Jalapeño Cheddar, Nacho Cheese and Zesty Ranch. The Doritos 3D line of puffed Doritos is still sold in Mexico. On December 21, 2020, it was announced that Doritos 3D would be returning to shelves on December 28. The snack was available in Chili Cheese Nacho and Spicy Ranch flavors, but it was later discontinued again.

== See also ==
- List of brand name snack foods

== Bibliography ==
- Harris, Thomas L. (1999). Value-Added Public Relations. McGraw-Hill Professional. ISBN 978-0-8442-3412-0.
- Smith, Andrew F. (2006). Encyclopedia of Junk Food and Fast Food. Greenwood Publishing Group. ISBN 978-0-313-33527-3.
- Stalk, George; Lachenauer, Rob; Butman, John (2004). Hardball: Are You Playing to Play or Playing to Win?. Harvard Business Press. ISBN 978-1-59139-167-8.
