= Pfeifer & Langen =

Family-owned food company

- Pfeifer & Langen logo
- Industry: Food
- Founded: 1870 (156 years ago)
- Headquarters: Cologne, Germany
- Key people: Guido Colsman, Uwe Schöneberg
- Revenue: €1.33 billion (2022)
- Number of employees: 2,521
- Website: www.pfeifer-langen.com

Pfeifer & Langen GmbH & Co. KG is a German family-owned food company, based in Cologne. The historical core of the group is the sugar manufacturer Pfeifer & Langen. The other activities of the group are held by the subgroups Intersnack, a manufacturer of snacks and owner of KP Snacks and Tayto; and the subgroup Naturkost Group, which produced and markets functional foods. In addition, the group holds a 50% share in the food manufacturer Krüger. The entire group achieved a turnover of 3.63 billion euros in the 2019 financial year.
