= Space Raiders =

Space Raiders may refer to:

- Space Raiders (band), a British big beat/electronic band
- Space Raiders (film), a 1983 science fiction film
- Space Raiders (snack food), a British snack food brand
- Space Raiders (video game), a 2002 re-imagining of Space Invaders
