= KP Snacks =

British producer of snacks

KP Snacks Limited
- Formerly: Is Brazil Limited (Nov–Dec 2012); Top Snacks Limited (2012–2013)
- Type: Limited
- Industry: Snacks; Peanuts
- Founded: 1853; 173 years ago
- Headquarters: Slough, England
- Area served: United Kingdom
- Products: Nuts; Crisps
- Owner: Intersnack
- Website: kpsnacks.com

KP Snacks Limited is a British producer of branded and own-label maize-, potato-, and nut-based snacks. Originating in 1853 in Rotherham, West Riding of Yorkshire, the KP stands for "Kenyon Produce". KP Snacks has been owned by the German company Intersnack since 2012 and is now based in Slough.

KP Snacks is currently the second largest maker of snack foods in Britain. It owns and produces various brands including KP Nuts, Hula Hoops, McCoy's crisps and Tyrrells crisps, and also distributes other brands under license in the country such as Pom-Bear. The company's largest factory is located in Teesside.

== History ==
The company was founded in Rotherham in 1853 as Kenyon & Son as a producer of confectionery, jam and pickles. By 1891 the company had become Kenyon & Son and Craven Limited. The company switched to producing roasted and salted hazelnuts in 1948, expanding to peanuts later. These were originally produced for sale in cinemas. In 1952 the company introduced Hercules Nuts and in 1953 the No.1 KP Nuts peanut brand.

Logo used for the namesake nuts and snacks

The company became part of United Biscuits (UB) in 1968. The KP Snacks subsidiary produces a range of packet snack brands including Hula Hoops, Skips, McCoy's, Frisps, Brannigan's, Royster's, Space Raiders, Nik Naks, Wheat Crunchies, Discos, and Phileas Fogg. The snacks part is based on Teesside and in Rotherham, near the UB distribution warehouse.

The Ashby-de-la-Zouch site won a Best Factory Award in 2004.

UB sold the company to the German company Intersnack in December 2012 for £500 million. The company moved its headquarters to Slough in 2015.

In February 2022, it was reported that the KP Snacks supply chain was affected by a ransomware attack.

In July 2023, workers threatened to strike because of low wages despite KP Snacks registering profits of £54 million. Unite union reported that the average pay at KP Snacks had fallen by 14% in real terms since 2018.

== Sourcing ==
As a group, they are the largest buyer of nuts in the world (as of 2019), sourcing from Asia, Africa, South America and Central America.

They have various local aid and sustainability projects.

== Brands ==
This is a list of snack brands distributed by KP Snacks including some that are not owned by it.

- Brannigans (discontinued)
- Butterkist
- Choc Dips
- Discos
- Frisps
- Hula Hoops
- KP Jacks
- KP Mini Chips
- KP Nuts
- KP Skydivers (discontinued)
- Meanies
- McCoy's
- Nik Naks
- Penn State
- Phileas Fogg (discontinued)
- Popchips
- Pom-Bear
- Quick Lunch
- Roysters
- Skips
- Space Raiders
- Tyrrells
- Velvet Crunch
- Wheat Crunchies
- Whole Earth

== Products ==
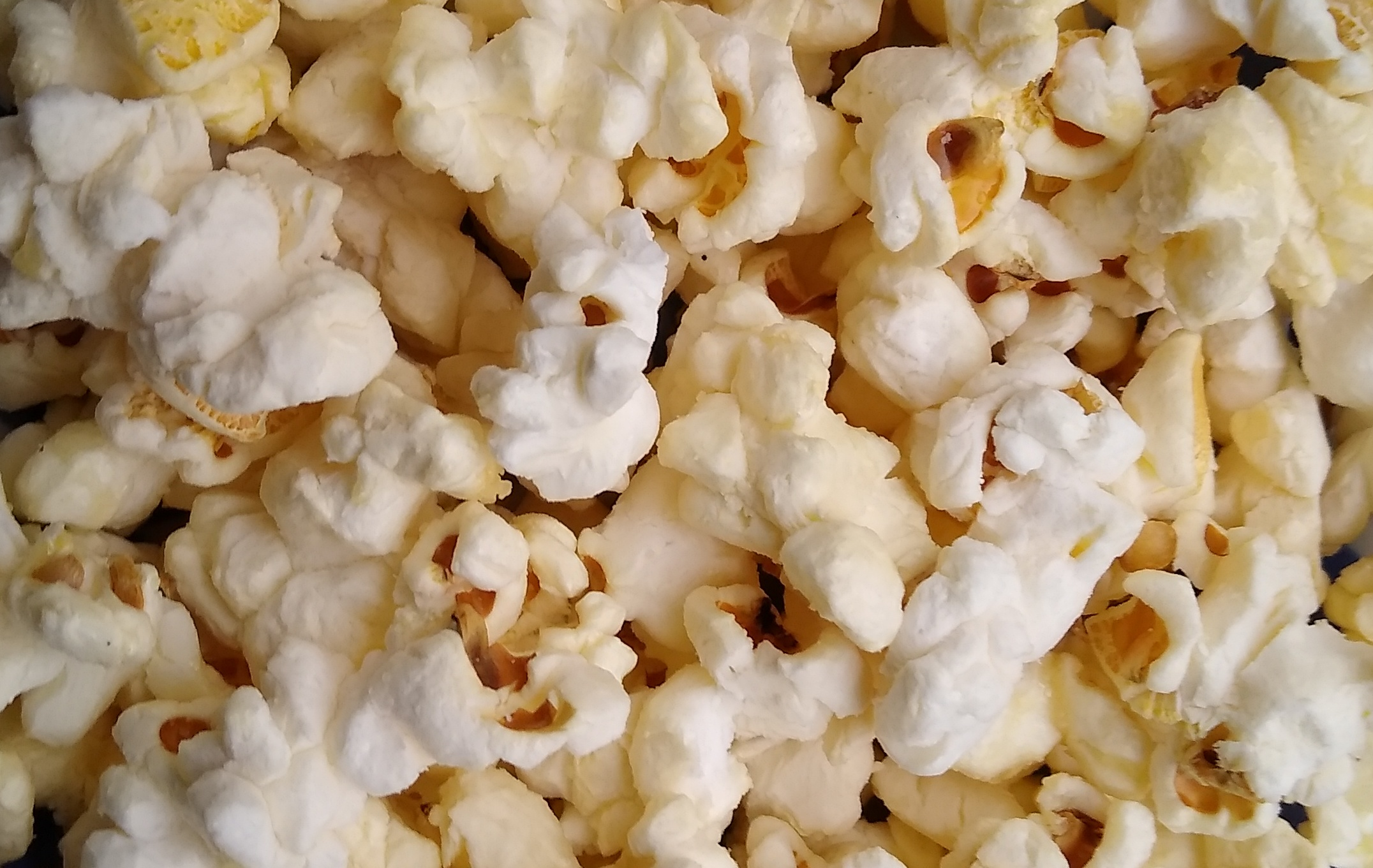
Butterkist

Butterkist (Popcorn)

- Sharing Bags
  - Toffee
  - Sweet Cinema Style
  - Sweet & Salted
  - Salted
- Microwave Popcorn
  - Salted
  - Sweet & Salted
  - Sweet
- Multipacks
  - Toffee
  - Sweet Cinema Style
  - Sweet & Salted

Choc Dips

- Original (Milk Chocolate dip)
- White Chocolate

Discos

- Cheese & Onion
- Prawn Cocktail
- Salt & Vinegar
- Pickled Onion

Frisps

- Cheese & Onion
- Ready Salted
- Salt & Vinegar

Hula Hoops

- BBQ Beef
- Cheese & Onion
- Original (Salted)
- Roast Chicken
- Salt & Vinegar
- Smokey Bacon
- Spicy
- Tangy Cheese

Big Hoops

- BBQ Beef
- Salted
- Salt & Vinegar
- Spicy Chilli
- Puft (Light and Puffed Hula Hoops)
- Beef
- Salted
- Salt & Vinegar
- Sweet Chilli
- Flavours
  - Tangy Cheese
  - Salt & Vinegar
  - Spicy

KP Nuts

- Original Salted
- Dry Roasted
- Honey Roast
- Salt & Vinegar
- Spicy Chilli
- Unsalted
- Peanut butter

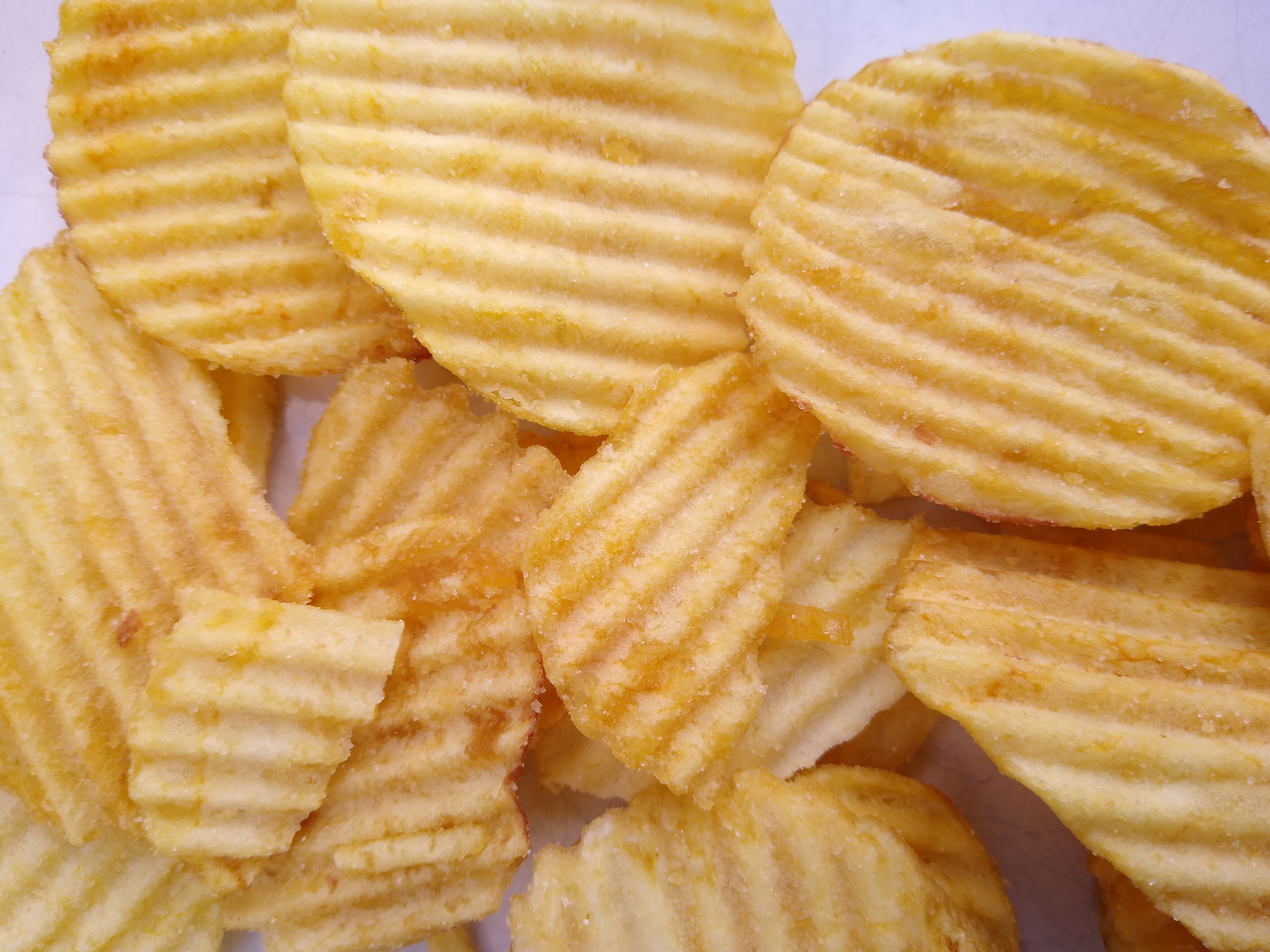
McCoy's salt & malt vinegar crisps

McCoy's

- Ridged
  - Flame Grilled Steak
  - Salt & Malt Vinegar
  - Cheddar & Onion
  - Sizzling King Prawn
  - Hot Mexican Chilli
  - Thai Sweet Chicken
  - Salted
  - Bacon Sizzler
  - Chargrilled Chicken
  - Chip Shop Curry Sauce
- Muchos
  - Nacho Cheese
  - Smoky Chilli Chicken
  - Cool Sour Cream & Onion

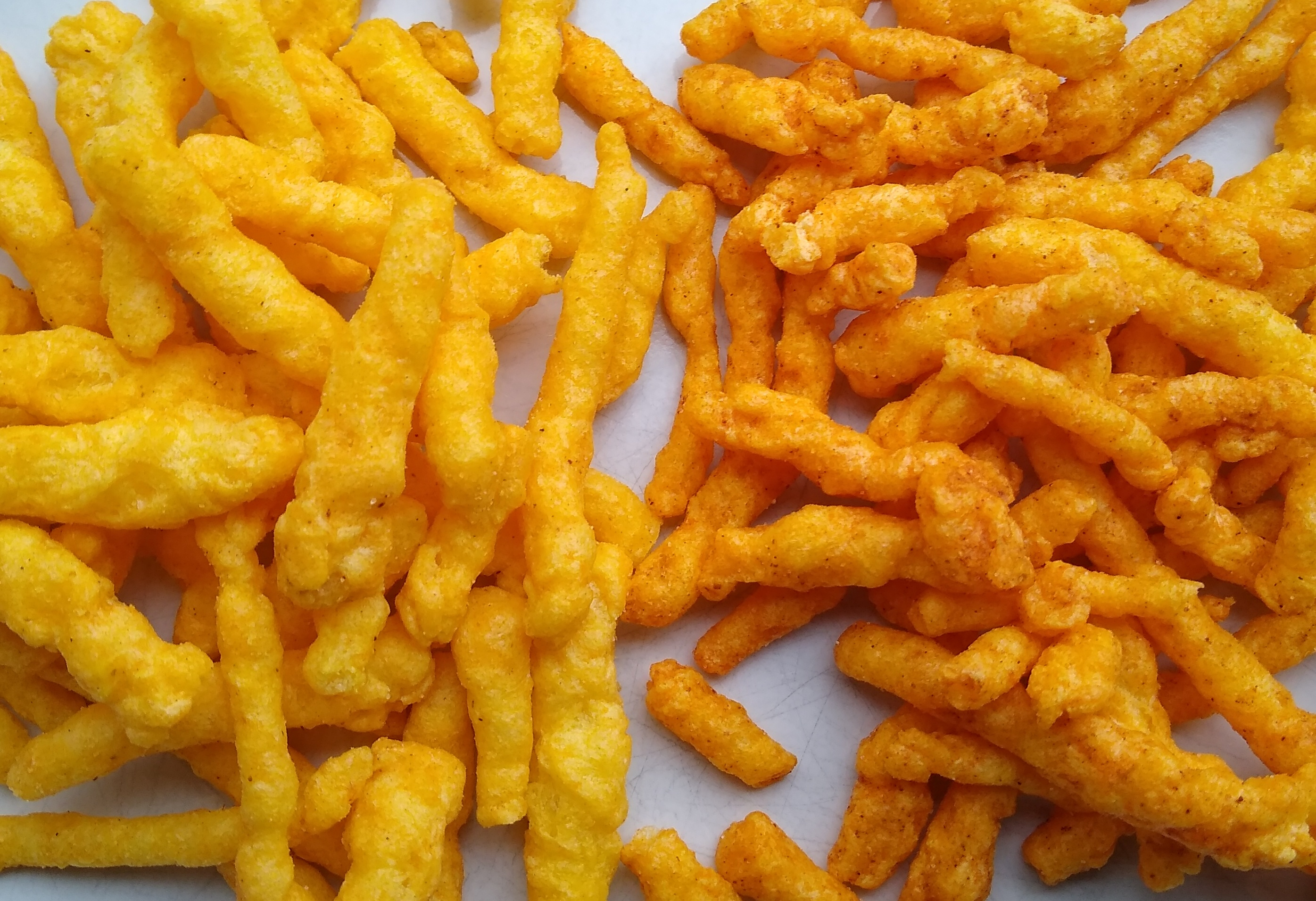
Two flavours of Nik Naks: "Nice 'n' Spicy" (left) and "Rib 'n' Saucy" (right)

Nik Naks

- Scampi 'n' Lemon
- Nice 'n' Spicy
- Rib 'n' Saucy
- Tangy 'n' Cheesy

Penn State

- Original Sea Salted
- Sour Cream & Chive

Popchips

- Sea Salt
- Barbecue
- Mature Cheddar & Onion
- Sea Salt & Vinegar
- Sour Cream & Onion
- Salt & Pepper
- Thai Sweet Chilli
- Ridges
  - Crazy Hot
  - Buffalo Ranch

Pom-Bear

- Flavours
  - Original
  - Cheese & Onion
  - Salt & Vinegar

Roysters

- T-Bone Steak

Skips

- Prawn Cocktail

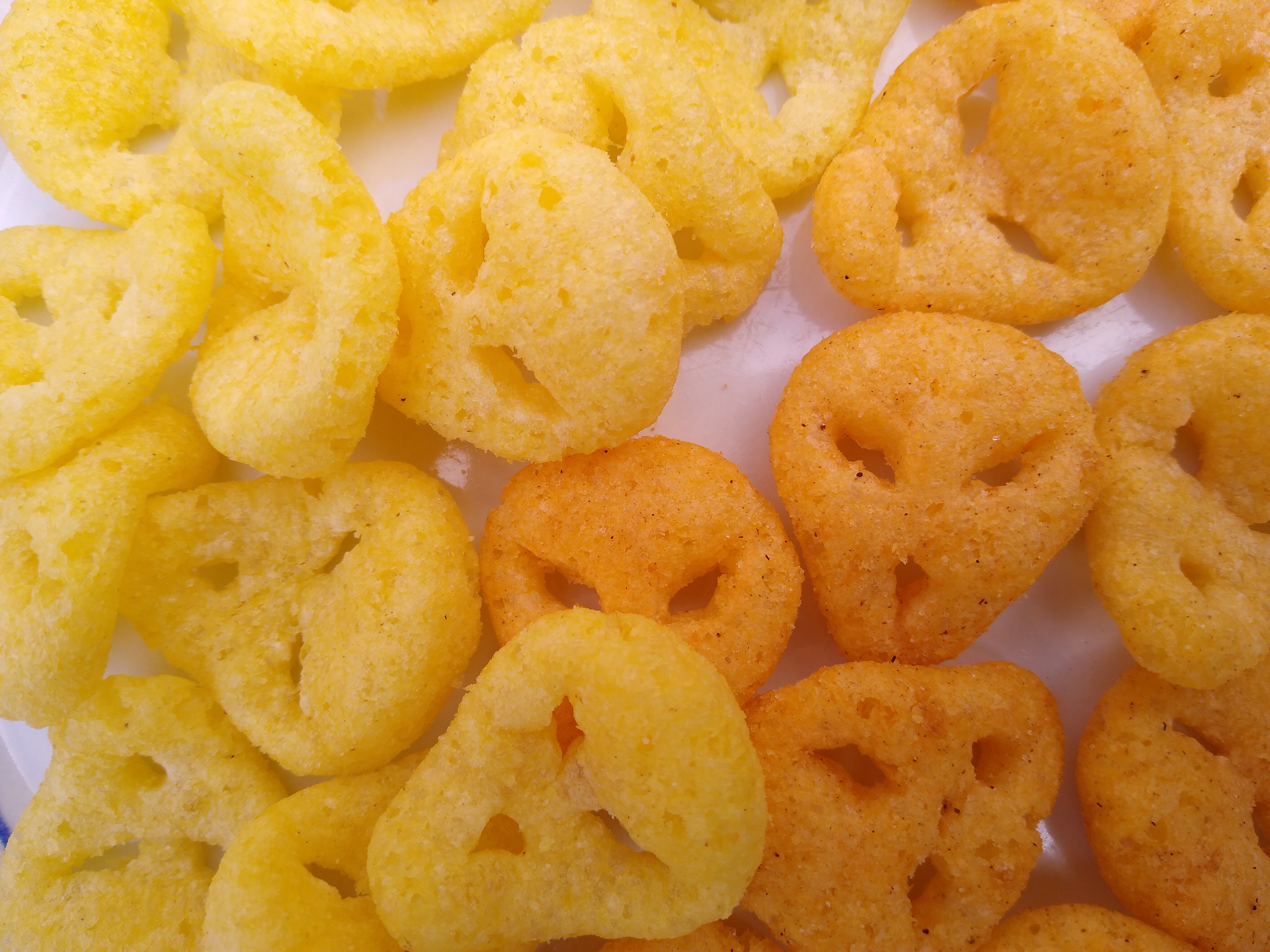
Space Raiders: pickled onion flavour (left) and saucy BBQ flavour (right)

Space Raiders

- Beef
- Pickled Onion
- Saucy BBQ
- Spicy

Tyrrells

- Lightly Salted
- Sea Salt & Cider Vinegar
- Mature Cheddar & Chive
- Sweet Chilli & Red Pepper
- Sea Salt & Black Pepper
- Sunday Best Roast Chicken
- Posh Prawn Cocktail
- Black Truffle & Sea Salt
- Smoked Paprika
- Naked (Unsalted)
- Sour Cream & Serenade Chilli
- Furrows Crisps
  - Sea Salt
  - Sea Salt & Vinegar
  - Aberdeen Angus Beef
  - Cheese & Pickled Onion

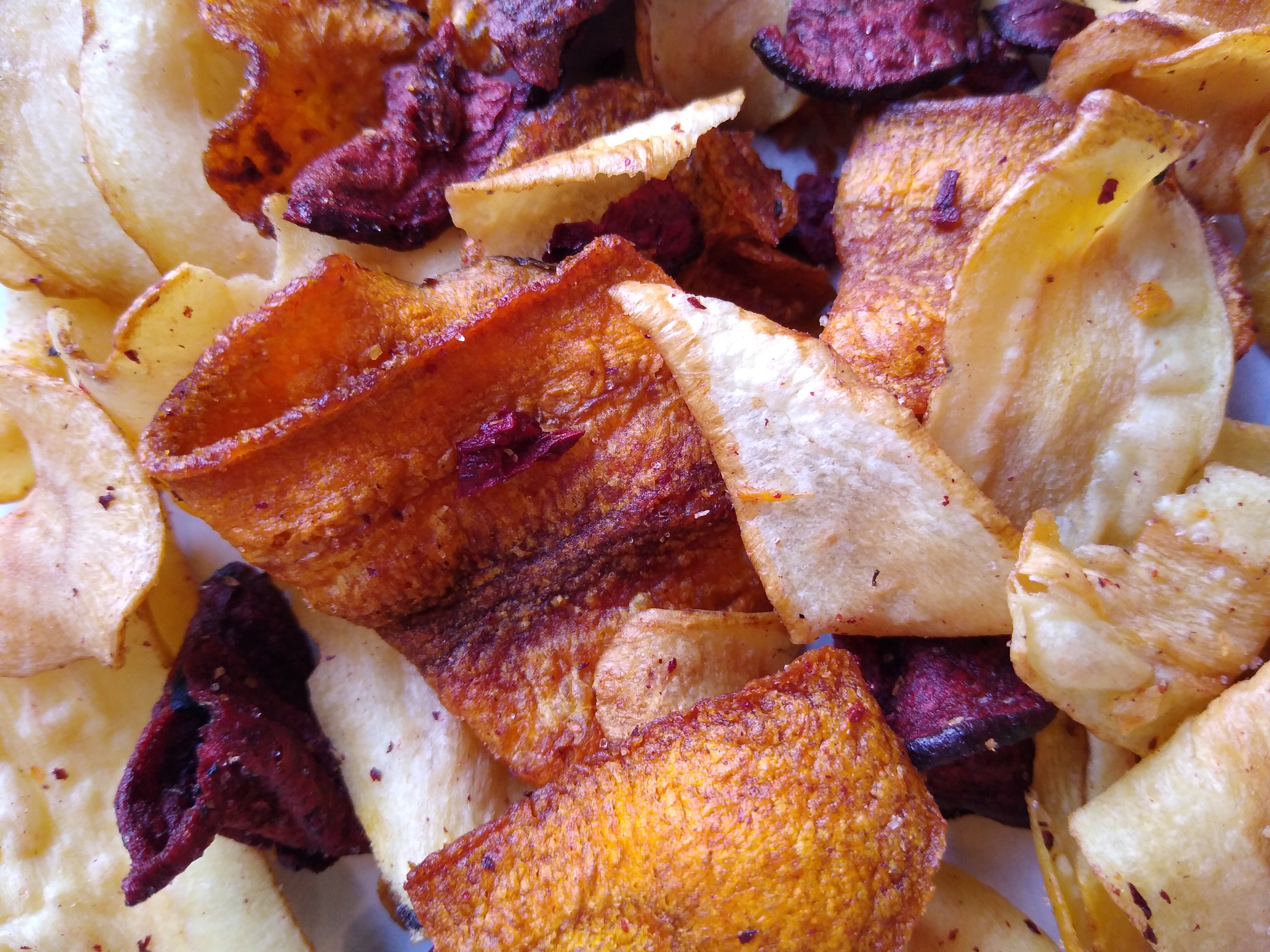
Tyrrells vegetable crisps

- Veg Crisps
  - Balsamic Vinegar & Sea Salt
  - Parsnip, Beetroot & Carrot With Sea Salt
- Popcorn
  - Sweet & Salty
  - Sea Salted
  - Sweet
- Nut Medleys
  - Sweet Chilli & Red Pepper
  - Sea Salt & Ground Black Pepper

Wheat Crunchies

- Cheddar & Onion
- Spicy Tomato
- Crispy Bacon

Whole Earth

Brand bought from Ecotone in 2024.

- Peanut butters
- Organic drinks
