= Dill pickle chips =

Variety of potato chip

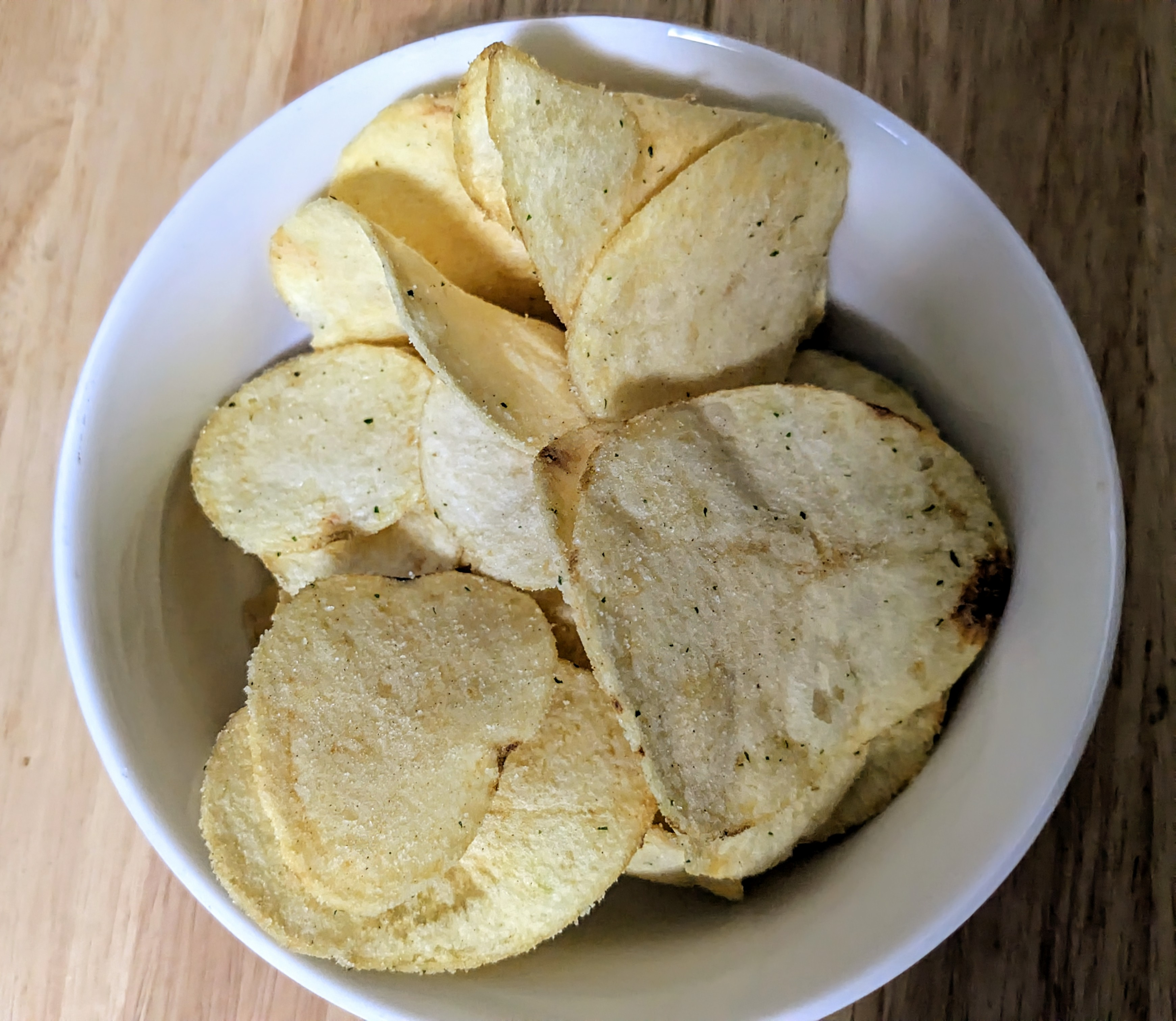
A bowl of store brand dill pickle chips

Dill pickle chips are a regional potato chip variety found in Canada and in the United States. Dill pickle chips are known for their vinegar-based pickle brine flavour. Some brands will sell them in a spicy variety. Chip flavours more common in Canada, such as dill pickle, are more vinegar-based in comparison to most flavours sold in the United States. American companies that sell dill pickle chips include Trader Joe's and Kroger. Doritos sells a dill pickle flavour variety exclusively in Canada.

== See also ==
- All-dressed
- Ketchup chip
- Salt and vinegar chip
- Canadian cuisine
