= Tayto (Republic of Ireland) =

Irish crisp and popcorn manufacturer

Tayto Snacks
- Industry: Potato crisps
- Founded: 25 May 1954; 72 years ago
- Founder: Joe Murphy
- Headquarters: Ashbourne, County Meath, Ireland
- Area served: Ireland
- Owner: Intersnack
- Website: taytocrisps.ie taytosnacks.ie

Tayto Snacks is an Irish crisp and popcorn manufacturer in Ireland, founded by Joe Murphy in May 1954 and is now owned by German snack food company Intersnack. It owns several brands, including its leading product of Tayto Crisps for which it invented the first flavoured crisp production process. The first seasoned crisps produced were 'cheese and onion'. Companies worldwide sought to buy the rights to Tayto's technique. Tayto crisps are a cultural phenomenon throughout most of Ireland, so much so that in November 2010, Tayto opened their own theme park called "Tayto Park" near Ashbourne, now known as Emerald Park.

The company is entirely separate from Tayto Group Limited in Northern Ireland, which has a similar product range. Tayto in the Republic of Ireland owns the name and mascot, and Tayto in Northern Ireland uses both under a licensing agreement. The Northern Irish Tayto is widely sold in Northern Ireland and, to a lesser extent, in Great Britain, while the Republic of Ireland brand is sold throughout the republic.

== History and ownership ==
Old logo for the crisps of the same name

Tayto was founded in 1954 in Dublin by Joe 'Spud' Murphy, who is credited with having invented the world's first flavoured crisp.

Two years later, in 1956, the licensing rights of the Tayto name and recipes were sold to the Hutchinson family for distribution outside the Republic of Ireland and allowed for the creation of Tayto (Northern Ireland).

Their first flavour was 'cheese and onion', the second in 1966 was 'Salt and Vinegar', then came 'smokey bacon' and more products since the 1970s.

The company came to be owned by Cantrell and Cochrane (C. & C.), and was based in Coolock, Dublin, until that factory was closed in September 2005, with production outsourced to Ray Coyle's Largo Foods. Largo agreed to purchase the brand from C. & C. in May 2006 for €62.3 million.

Coyle sold partial control of the company to German food company Intersnack, and in 2015, he sold his remaining shares, ending the Irish ownership of the company. In Northern Ireland, Tayto Limited is still owned and run by the Hutchinson family and is totally distinct from Tayto in Republic of Ireland, from which it licences the brand.

In 2024, The Story of Tayto, a book chronicling the history of the company, was written by Bobby Aherne and published by The Lilliput Press.

== Brands ==
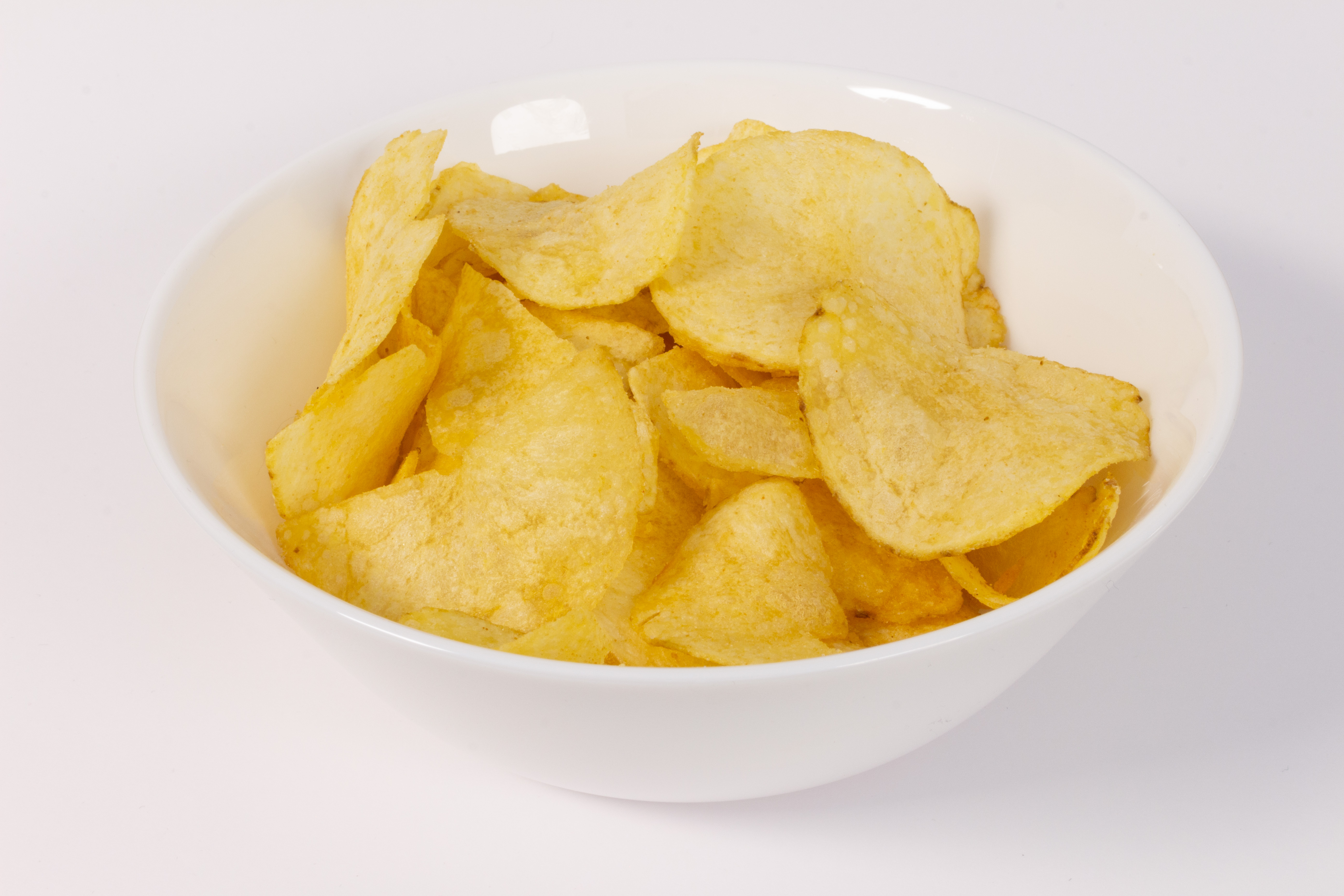
A bowl of Tayto Cheese & Onion flavour potato crisps

Tayto crisps come in several flavours: Cheese & Onion, Salt & Vinegar, Smokey Bacon, Prawn Cocktail, and the limited edition flavour Tex Mex.

In the early 2000s, the company targeted the healthy eating market, with its low salt, low fat crisps, originally branded as Honest. Tayto referred to this range as the Happy & Healthy range. The healthy range has since evolved and Tayto have launched Tayto Lentils which is 40% less fat to target the healthy eating market.

Tayto Snack's portfolio of brands includes Tayto, King, O'Donnells of Tipperary, Hunky Dorys, Hula Hoops, Popchips, KP, Penn State, Pom-Bear, & McCoy's.

== Marketing ==
Tayto has used its mascot, Mr Tayto, in a number of marketing campaigns with previous endorsers such as Westlife. In the 2007 Irish general election, Tayto ran an advertising campaign with Mr Tayto as a fake election candidate. Tayto claimed that the number of spoiled votes in the Carlow–Kilkenny constituency indicate that some actually voted for their mascot, but this is purely speculative. Tayto was fined during the campaign for littering, due to its fake election posters being posted in public places.

In 2009 Tayto Ltd. published The Man Inside the Jacket, a fictional autobiography of Mr Tayto written by Maia Dunphy, Ciaran Morrison and Mick O'Hara. Tayto indicated that a percentage of the cover price would go to Irish charity Aware, which assists people affected by depression, bipolar disorder and related mood conditions.

In May 2022 the Mr. Tayto mascot was removed from all Cheese & Onion packaging, and a "Where Is Mr. Tayto" tagline was added. Later that month, a statement was made from Mr. Tayto's official social media accounts which claimed that Mr. Tayto was taking a break from work to see the world, beginning the "Mr. Tayto's Bucket List" campaign.

== Tayto Park ==
In November 2010, Ray Coyle (who owned Largo Foods and Tayto at the time), opened a theme park named Tayto Park near Ashbourne in County Meath The park remained under Coyle's ownership when Largo Foods and the Tayto brand became part of Intersnack. Factory tours were available in conjunction with visits to the theme park on certain days.

In February 2022, it was announced that the existing title sponsorship contract would not be renewed, with the park renamed to "Emerald Park" when the existing contract expired in January 2023. Other than still selling Tayto crisps in its shops, the park now has no references to the Tayto, and no longer offers factory tours.

== Legal action ==
In 2006, Tayto tried to compel Irish band Toasted Heretic to destroy all copies of their album Now in New Nostalgia Flavour, which featured an image based on the trademarked "Mr Tayto" icon, although the image had been used since 1988 on Toasted Heretic's cassette album Songs for Swinging Celibates.

== Advertising ==
It's possible that Tayto could have been the first product to be advertised on Irish television, during Christmas of 1961, but this is difficult to confirm. Furthermore, Tayto had a number of popular advertisements featuring the tagline "They Ate The Wonder Of The World" in 1993 and the company also sponsored a GAA football match in 2005. In 2023, Tayto debuted a Christmas advert featuring Santa Claus.
