= The Whole Shebang =

The Whole Shebang may refer to:

- The Whole Shebang (film), a 2001 romantic comedy film
- The Whole SHeBANG, a 1999 album by country music trio SHeDAISY
- The Shebang, a radio program previously known as The Whole Shebang
- The Whole Shebang, a 2005 album by Tennessee band Fluid Ounces
- The Whole Shebang: A State-of-the-Universe(s) Report, a book by Timothy Ferris

== See also ==
- The Whole Shabang, a brand of seasoned snacks
- Shebang (disambiguation)
