= Intersnack =

German snack food company

Intersnack Group GmbH & Co. KG
- Trade name: Intersnack
- Type: GmbH & Co. KG
- Industry: Snacks
- Founded: 1968; 58 years ago
- Headquarters: Düsseldorf, Germany
- Area served: Europe, Asia and Oceania
- Key people: Johan van Winkel; Henrik Bauwens; Fabien Duvilla
- Revenue: €4.51 billion (2024)
- Owner: Pfeifer & Langen
- Number of employees: 14,539 (2024)
- Subsidiaries: KP Snacks; Tayto Snacks; Griffin's Foods; Snack Brands Australia
- Website: intersnackgroup.com

Intersnack Group GmbH & Co. KG, based in Düsseldorf, Germany, is an international manufacturer of savoury snacks for branded and private-label products. The company made its first potato chips in 1968.

The privately owned company is part of Pfeifer & Langen and generated revenues of around €4.51 billion in 2024, employing 14,539 people worldwide.

Notable brands and companies under Intersnack include funny-frisch, Hula Hoops, McCoy's, Pom-Bear, Chio Chips, Vico, ültje, Penn State, Bohemia, and Tayto Crisps.

== Company history ==
=== Background from 1962 to 1995 ===
The company's history dates back to 1962, when Irmgard von Opel, together with her two sons, Carlo and Heinz, started producing potato chips under the brand name Chio (an acronym for Carlo, Heinz and Irmgard von Opel) in Petersau.

In 1968, the Cologne-based sugar company Pfeifer & Langen founded the company Chipsfrisch. This subsidiary merged in 1972 with the savoury snacks division of the Munich-based food producer Pfanni. The brand funny-frisch was created for the joint product range. The company Convent Knabbergebäck GmbH & Co. was formed in 1977 through a merger and managed the brands Chio and funny-frisch.

The company Josef Wolf GmbH & Co. KG, was founded in 1905 in Darmstadt-Eberstadt as a bakery. In 1967, this company established the brand goldfischli by acquiring a licence and subsequently the trademark rights from Kambly, a Swiss provider. 20 years later, it created the brand Pom-Bär (Pom-Bear).

In 1995, the Convent Group acquired Josef Wolf GmbH & Co. KG and founded Intersnack Knabber-Gebäck GmbH & Co. KG.

=== Intersnack Knabbergebäck GmbH & Co. from 1995 ===
Following the merger that formed Intersnack Knabbergebäck GmbH, the company expanded its international activities. At that time, Intersnack already had production facilities and distribution companies abroad. These included plants in Hungary, the Czech Republic, Slovakia, Poland, and the United Kingdom. In addition, there were sales branches in Austria, Switzerland, France, and Slovenia. In other European countries, Intersnack products were distributed via legally independent dealers. In 1998, Intersnack acquired the Vico company, and its Vico and Monster Munch brands. Since then, it has operated as the subsidiary Intersnack France.

In August 1997, the German trade journal Lebensmittel Zeitung estimated the revenue of the Intersnack Group at one billion Deutsche Mark. It assessed domestic revenue at 70 per cent. At that time, Convent and Wolf organised their domestic business separately under the umbrella of the holding company Intersnack Knabber-Gebäck GmbH & Co. KG. On 1 January 2000, Convent and Wolf were operationally merged.

At the end of 2002 and the beginning of 2003, suppliers of potato crisps in Germany were affected by the debate on acrylamide in food. Intersnack also recorded a decline in revenue, but recovered quickly. The introduction of oven crisps in 2003 was regarded by Intersnack, among other things, as a response to the acrylamide debate.

In 2008, the Intersnack Group merged with the Nut Company, which also included the brand ültje. As a result of the merger, the nut brands and product ranges operated by the Nut Company were incorporated into Intersnack’s corporate structure, thereby expanding the existing range to include a nut segment.

From 2005, Intersnack had production sites in Romania and Bulgaria. One year later, Intersnack and Lorenz Snack-World agreed on an exchange of their activities in France and Poland. In this context, Lorenz took over the Polish company Polsnack, which had previously belonged to Intersnack, while Lorenz Snack-World France was integrated into the Intersnack Group. The existing brands of both companies continued to be produced and marketed in both countries on the basis of trademark licensing agreements. The Group acquired the Austrian market leader Kelly in 2007. In March the following year, the Bundeswettbewerbsbehörde (Federal Competition Authority) approved the acquisition. In 2007, Intersnack also acquired a minority stake in Largo (now Tayto), a snack company in the Irish market. The stake was later increased to 51 per cent, and in 2015, 100 per cent of the shares were ultimately acquired.

=== Founding of Intersnack Group GmbH & Co. KG ===
In 2008, the interim company Atrium Knabber-Gebäck GmbH & Co. KG was renamed Intersnack Group GmbH & Co. KG. At the same time, the registered office of this company was relocated from Cologne to Düsseldorf.

In 2012, Intersnack acquired KP Snacks from United Biscuits for an estimated £500 million. The acquisition of Estrella Maarud followed in 2014. As a result, the group expanded its activities in Scandinavia and the Baltic states. The group acquired the British crisps manufacturer Tyrrells in 2018.

In 2015, Aldi included Intersnack branded products in its range. Other food retailers subsequently demanded reduced purchase prices. After intensive negotiations, agreements were reached with all customers, including Edeka and its discount subsidiary Netto, in mid-2016.

In December 2019, Intersnack and Philippine company Universal Robina formed Unisnack ANZ, a joint venture comprising Griffin's Foods and Snack Brands Australia. Intersnack held a 40% stake in the consolidated business. In August 2021, Universal Robina exited the Australian and New Zealand market by selling its remaining 60% stake in Unisnack ANZ to the company.

In May 2020, Intersnack Knabber-Gebäck GmbH & Co. KG and ültje GmbH announced that they would combine their marketing and sales activities.

Through its British subsidiary KP Snacks, the Intersnack Group acquired the company Whole Earth Foods in 2024. At the time of the acquisition, Whole Earth was regarded as the market-leading brand for peanut butter in the United Kingdom.

In 2025, the expansion of several sites of Intersnack Deutschland SE, which is responsible for operational business in Germany, began. At the plant in Alsbach-Hähnlein, a production hall of around 10,000 square metres with a logistics area is being built. At the Wevelinghoven site, several extensions are being constructed in order to enlarge the factory area and thereby create an additional production line for crisps.

In July 2026, Utz Brands agreed to be acquired and taken private by Intersnack in a transaction valued at approximately US$2.9 billion. Intersnack agreed to pay $14.25 per share for Utz's publicly traded stock, while entities controlled by the founding Rice and Lissette families would retain a 50% stake after the transaction. The acquisition was expected to be completed by the end of 2026.

== Company structure ==
Intersnack Group GmbH & Co. KG is the holding company of the Intersnack Group. Members of the management board of the Intersnack Group are Henrik Bauwens, Johan van Winkel and Maarten Leerdam.

The group operates predominantly at a European level in both the branded and private-label business. Through subsidiaries, the group is represented across Europe as well as in Asia, Australia and New Zealand. As of December 2024, the Intersnack Group owns 60 subsidiaries as well as 33 production sites in Europe, five sites in Asia and a further seven sites across Australia and New Zealand.

Intersnack Deutschland SE has its headquarters in Cologne. Karl Westing has been the spokesperson for the management board since 2022. Production takes place at five sites in Germany: Alsbach, Petersau near Frankenthal, Olsberg, Schwerte and Wevelinghoven (Grevenbroich).

== Products and brands ==
Intersnack and its subsidiaries produce crisps, nut products, extruded and pelletised products, pretzels, crackers, peanut butter, popcorn and similar products for the food industry. In the European market for savoury snacks, Intersnack is ranked second after PepsiCo.

Its brands include leading brands such as funny-frisch, Chio, Estrella, Hula Hoops, Pom-Bear, McCoy’s, ültje, Vico, Tayto, Maarud, Tyrrells, Popchips and Whole Earth, as well as private labels and own brands of European retailers.

The leading brands in Germany are funny-frisch, Chio, Pom-Bär, Tyrrells, Whole Earth and ültje. The main competitors in the German market include Lorenz Snack-World and PepsiCo.

== Sponsoring ==
Intersnack Deutschland SE is involved in sports sponsorship in Germany through its brands, particularly in the field of football. The funny-frisch brand was the shirt sponsor of 1. FC Köln during the 2003/04 and 2004/05 seasons and has been an official partner of the Bundesliga and the 2. Bundesliga since 2024. In addition, the Chio brand has been an official partner of the NFL in Germany since 2022. In the field of e-sports, Intersnack has supported Team Fokus Clan since 2018.

Bastian Schweinsteiger served as a brand ambassador for funny-frisch from 2011 to 2022. In 2017, Lukas Podolski joined him.
