= Skips (snack) =

Snack from the United Kingdom and Ireland

- Product type: Tapioca (UK) and maize (ROI)
- Current owner: KP Snacks and Tayto (Republic of Ireland)
- Country: United Kingdom
- Introduced: 1974
- Markets: United Kingdom, Ireland
- Website: www.kpsnacks.com/our-brands/

Skips is a snack product from the United Kingdom and Ireland, first launched in 1974 in prawn cocktail flavour. They are similar to Indonesian prawn crackers, but are smaller and have a finer texture that makes them fizz and melt on the tongue.

Skips are made by KP Snacks under licence of the German snack food company Intersnack. In the United Kingdom they are made with tapioca starch, and in Ireland with maize starch. Packets of Skips often have jokes or tongue twisters written on the back, which are aimed at children.

Other flavours, such as pickled onion, Caribbean Spice curry, Hot from Rio chilli, Chinese spare rib, a limited edition ReBoot Dots Doughnut and a ReBoot pizza flavour, Sweetcorn Relish (1985), and Sweet'n'Sour have been available in the past.

In 2002, KP launched two new variations of Skips intended to offer a 'unique taste sensation'. Buzz Boltz featured a 'crunch-melt' experience and Tickle Pickle delivered a 'puff-melt' sensation. Both have since been discontinued.

In 2012, the brand and KP Snacks were sold by United Biscuits to the German company Intersnack.

In the Republic of Ireland, Skips are sold under the Tayto brand, which is also owned by Intersnack.

== See also ==
- List of brand name snack foods
