= The Whole Shabang =

Snack brand

The Whole Shabang Original and Extreme Rippled Potato Chips

The Whole Shabang is a brand of seasoned potato chips made by the Keefe Group, a food vendor for prison commissary stores. Initially sold in prisons around the United States as Moon Lodge potato chips, they garnered a cult following among former inmates, correctional officers, and others. In 2016, the company spun off the flavor from the Moon Lodge line and began selling the chips under the name The Whole Shabang to the general public via online order.

== History ==
Prior to being branded as The Whole Shabang, the chips were a flavor of Moon Lodge, a private label brand of potato chips in prison commissary stores produced by Keefe Group. The flavor is often described as a hybrid between salt and vinegar and barbecue potato chips, and may be compared to all-dressed chips common in Canada.

Like most of Keefe's products, the chips were not initially sold outside of prisons. Ex-inmates looked for the product upon their release but often could not find it, leading to a grey market for The Whole Shabang through e-commerce sites such as eBay. Many used social media to contact Keefe directly, asking them to offer the chips for sale to the general public. In 2012, Keefe publicly acknowledged the popularity of the chips.

In 2016, demand from ex-inmates and other prison visitors prompted Keefe to spin off The Whole Shabang from its Moon Lodge line and offer them for sale online to the general public.

== Flavors ==
Keefe offers The Whole Shabang in several flavors.

- The Whole Shabang Original potato chips
- The Whole Shabang Extreme rippled potato chips
- The Whole Shabang Extreme kettle-cooked potato chips
- The Whole Shabang Original popcorn (discontinued)
- The Whole Shabang Extreme crunchies
- The Whole Shabang Original peanuts
