= Lorenz Snack-World =

German food company

Lorenz Snacks GmbH & Co KG
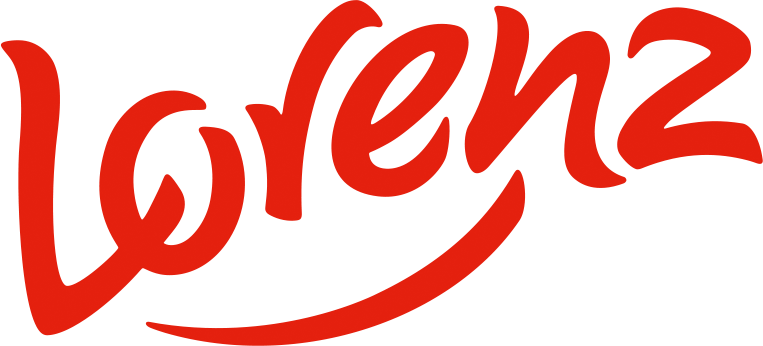
- Type: Private
- Industry: Food
- Founded: 1999; 27 years ago
- Headquarters: Offenbach am Main, Hesse, Germany
- Revenue: ▼€541,390,000
- Parent: Bahlsen
- Website: lorenz-snacks.de

Lorenz Snacks is a German food company based in Offenbach am Main. It was founded in 1999.

Lorenz produces a range of potato chips. The company exports products to about 30 countries and offers private-label production services.

In 2024, Lorenz acquired the Norwegian food manufacturer GC Rieber Compact AS, which specialises in humanitarian nutrition solutions, thereby expanding its portfolio beyond its core business of savoury snacks to include the humanitarian sector.

In 2025, the company changed its name from Lorenz Bahlsen Snack-World to Lorenz Snacks as part of its relocation from Neu-Isenburg to Offenbach am Main.

== Variants ==
- Naturals Mild Paprika
- Naturals Sea Salt & Pepper
- Naturals Mediterranean Vegetables
- Naturals Rosemary
- Naturals Salted
- Naturals Parmesan
- Crunchips Paprika
- Crunchips Salted
- Crunchips Red Chili
- Crunchips Barbecue
- Crunchips Salt & Vinegar
- Crunchips Chili & Lime
