= Shebang =

Shebang may refer to:

== Arts and entertainment ==
- The Shebang, an Australian radio show
- She-Bang, a character from the cartoon Static Shock
- Shebang, a mid 1960s dance show hosted by Casey Kasem
- Shebang (album), a 2022 studio album by Oren Ambarchi

== Other uses ==
- shebang (Unix), the #! syntax used in computer programs to indicate an interpreter for execution

== See also ==
- "Shabang", by Drake, 2026
- "She Bangs", a song performed by Ricky Martin
- The Whole Shebang (disambiguation)
