= McCoy's (crisp) =

UK crisps brand

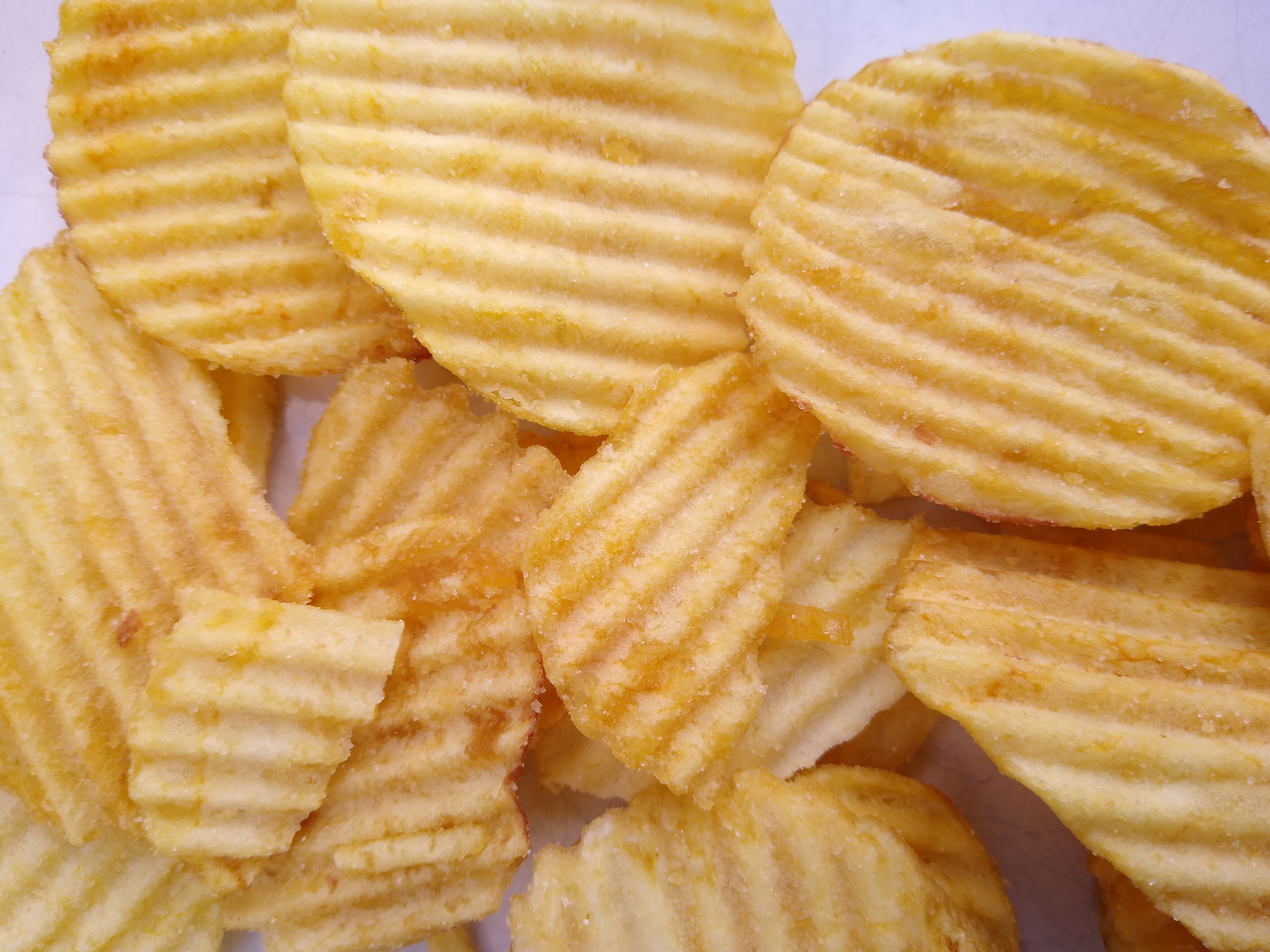
- McCoy's Salt & Malt Vinegar crisps
- Country: United Kingdom
- Introduced: 1985
- Website: mccoys.co.uk

McCoy's is a brand of crinkle-cut crisps made in the United Kingdom by KP Snacks. It was first produced in 1985 and is marketed under the slogan "The Real McCoy's – Accept No Imitations" ("Don't Deny the Beast" in current advertising), exploiting the Scottish idiom "the real McCoy". McCoy's is the third-biggest brand in the bagged crisps market, with 5 million packets consumed each week and nearly a third of all UK households consuming the product. It was once promoted by United Biscuits "as the only overtly male-targeted crisp brand".

The core product comes in a variety of flavours, which include Flame Grilled Steak, Salt & Malt Vinegar, and Cheddar & Onion. The specials range includes Jalapeño Chilli with Cheese, Cheddar with Mango Chutney, Oriental Ribs, Thai Sweet Chicken and Peppered Rib Eye Steak. McCoy’s Jackets, launched in early 2007, are ridge cut potato chips with their skins left on. They come in Chilli Beef, Sour Cream & Chive, and Melted Cheese & Bacon flavours. McCoy's Specials Tortillas are a range of ridged tortilla chips launched in 2006. In early 2012, the Oriental Ribs flavour was renamed BBQ Ribs. In 2019, the Tortillas were relaunched as MUCHOS, and come in Nacho Cheese, Smoked Chilli Chicken and Sour Cream & Onion flavours.

In September 2013, McCoy's unveiled a packaging concept in which the crisp bag is opened along the longer side to allow bigger hands to fit in. The concept was developed by BTL Brands.

On 7 April 2022, it was noted that McCoy's would regularly introduce trends of flavours which would be on the shelf for a limited time.

== Flavours ==
Ridge Cut Classic Flavours

- Cheddar & Onion [Green] - 47.5G, 70G
- Salt & Malt Vinegar [Blue] - 47.5G, 70G
- Salted [Red] - 47.5G

Ridge Cut Meaty Flavours

- Bacon Sizzler [Purple] - 47.5G
- Chargrilled Chicken [Dark Orange] - 47.5G
- Flame Grilled Steak [Brown] - 47.5G, 70G

Ridge Cut Spicy Flavours

- Mexican Chilli [Bright Orange] - 47.5G
- Paprika [Yellow] - 47.5G
- Sizzling King Prawn [Pink] - 47.5G
- Thai Sweet Chicken [Green-Blue] - 47.5G

Chip Shop Flavours

- Curry Sauce [Yellow]
- Salt & Vinegar [Blue]
- Salted [Red]

Thick Cut Flavours

- Salted
- Salt & Cider Vinegar
- Cheddar & Red Onion
- Beef & Onion
- Crispy Bacon
- BBQ Chicken

Former Flavours

- Barbecue Chicken [Yellow-Brown]
- Ham & Mustard [Dark Pink]
- BBQ Ribs (previously Oriental Ribs) [Purple]
- Lamb Vindaloo [Green]
- Chicken Jalfrezi [Yellow]
- Sour Cream & Jalapeño - Jackets range [Green]
- Melted Cheese & Bacon Flavour - Jackets range [Gold]
- Chilli Con Carne Flavour - Jackets range [Burgundy]
- Cheddar And Onion with a Jalapeño twist
- Salt & Malt Vinegar with a chilli twist
- Roast Onion (1990s)

Ridge Cut MultiPacks - packs of 27g (30g packs pre 2016)

- The Classics 6 pack (Salt & Malt Vinegar x2 / Salted x2 / Cheddar & Onion x2)
- Mighty Meaty 6 pack (Sizzling King Prawn x2 / Flame Grilled Steak x2 / Thai Sweet Chicken x2)
- Nicely Spicy 6 pack (Mexican Chilli x2 / Thai Sweet Chicken x2 / Sizzling King Prawn x2)
- Salted 6 pack
- Salt & Malt Vinegar 6 Pack
- Cheddar & Onion 6 Pack
- Flame Grilled Steak 6 Pack
- Sizzling Prawns 6 Pack
- The Classics 18 pack (Salt & Malt Vinegar x6 / Salted x6 / Cheddar & Onion x6)
- The Classics 5 pack (Salt & Malt Vinegar x2 / Salted x1 / Cheddar & Onion x2)
- Jackets - jacket potato flavours 6 pack

Thick Cut MultiPacks - packs of 30g

- Thick Cut Classics 5 pack (Salt & Cider Vinegar x2 / Salted x1 / Cheddar & Red Onion x2)
- Thick Cut Meaty 5 pack (Beef & Onion x2 / Crispy Bacon x1 / BBQ Chicken x2)
- Cheddar & Red Onion 5 pack

Tortillas

- Hot Chilli 50g [Red]
- Nacho Cheese 50g [Yellow]
- Cool Ranch 220g [Blue]
- Hot Chilli 220g
- Nacho Cheese 220g
- BBQ Chicken 220g

== Darts sponsorship ==
McCoy's was the sponsor of the Premier League Darts for two years, in 2012 and 2013.

== See also ==
- Ruffles (similar product)
- Seabrook (similar product)
- Walkers
- Tudor Crisps
- List of brand name snack foods
