= Space Raiders (band) =

English electronic music group

Space Raiders were an electronic group from Middlesbrough. They formed in 1997, making their debut at the Middlesbrough Arena on Halloween 1997. Their performance consisted of the members of the band kitted out in fancy dress dancing to a pre-recorded Digital Audio Tape.

Despite this humble start, the band was signed to Fatboy Slim's Skint Records in Brighton and released their debut single "Glam Raid" in early 1998. It reached #68 in the UK Singles Chart in March. The band went on to release their debut album, Don't Be Daft and a second album Hot Cakes.

The band is probably best known for their single; "(I Need The) Disko Doktor". "Laidback" also received airplay on cable music rotation channels. Also, their single "Song for Dot" was featured in the games SSX and SSX Tricky. A follow-up to the single was released, entitled "Song for Dot II".

== Name ==
It is claimed that the inspiration for the name Space Raiders came from an empty Space Raiders crisp packet that blew through Gary Bradford's home in Middlesbrough.
