= Salt and vinegar crisps =

Potato crisp flavour

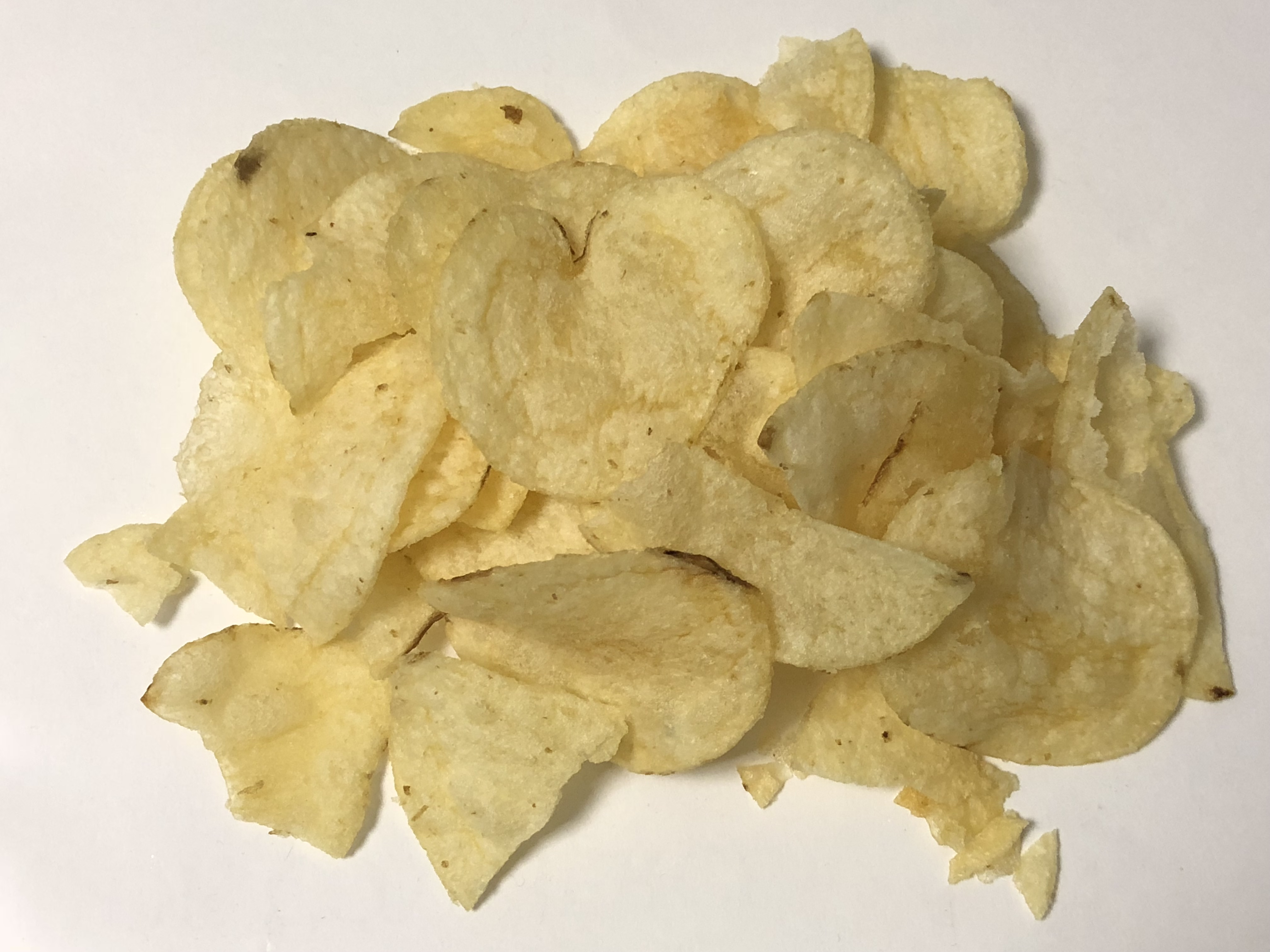
Salt and vinegar crisps, as manufactured by Lay's

Salt and vinegar crisps are a potato crisp variety. They are considered a staple snack in both the United Kingdom and the Republic of Ireland, and is one of the earliest varieties of flavoured crisps. They are sometimes flavoured with sea salt and sodium diacetate. The flavour is based on the British favourite dish "Fish and chips" where condiments salt and vinegar can be added to the chips (depending on the preferences of the purchaser) when served.

Salt and vinegar crisps have a strong smell when opened with a flavour that pairs well with beer. Multiple brands that sell the variety only use vegan ingredients.

The flavour was first introduced in Ireland in 1966 by Tayto, the company which had pioneered the flavouring of crisps, having already introduced the cheese and onion variety in 1954. In Great Britain, the flavour was first introduced nationally by Smith's in 1967, and became highly popular. In the 1970s through the 2000s, salt and vinegar was either the second or third best selling flavour in the country, along with cheese and onion, while ready salted was the single most popular. In more recent years, salt and vinegar has matched or outdone the popularity of ready salted. Most brands and supermarkets sell these three varieties in multi-pack bags, as a pack of 6.

Salt and vinegar crisps are the fourth-most popular potato chip flavour in the US.

== See also ==
- Fish and chips
- All-dressed
- Dill pickle chip
- Ketchup chip
- Canadian cuisine
