= Butterkist =

Brand of popcorn

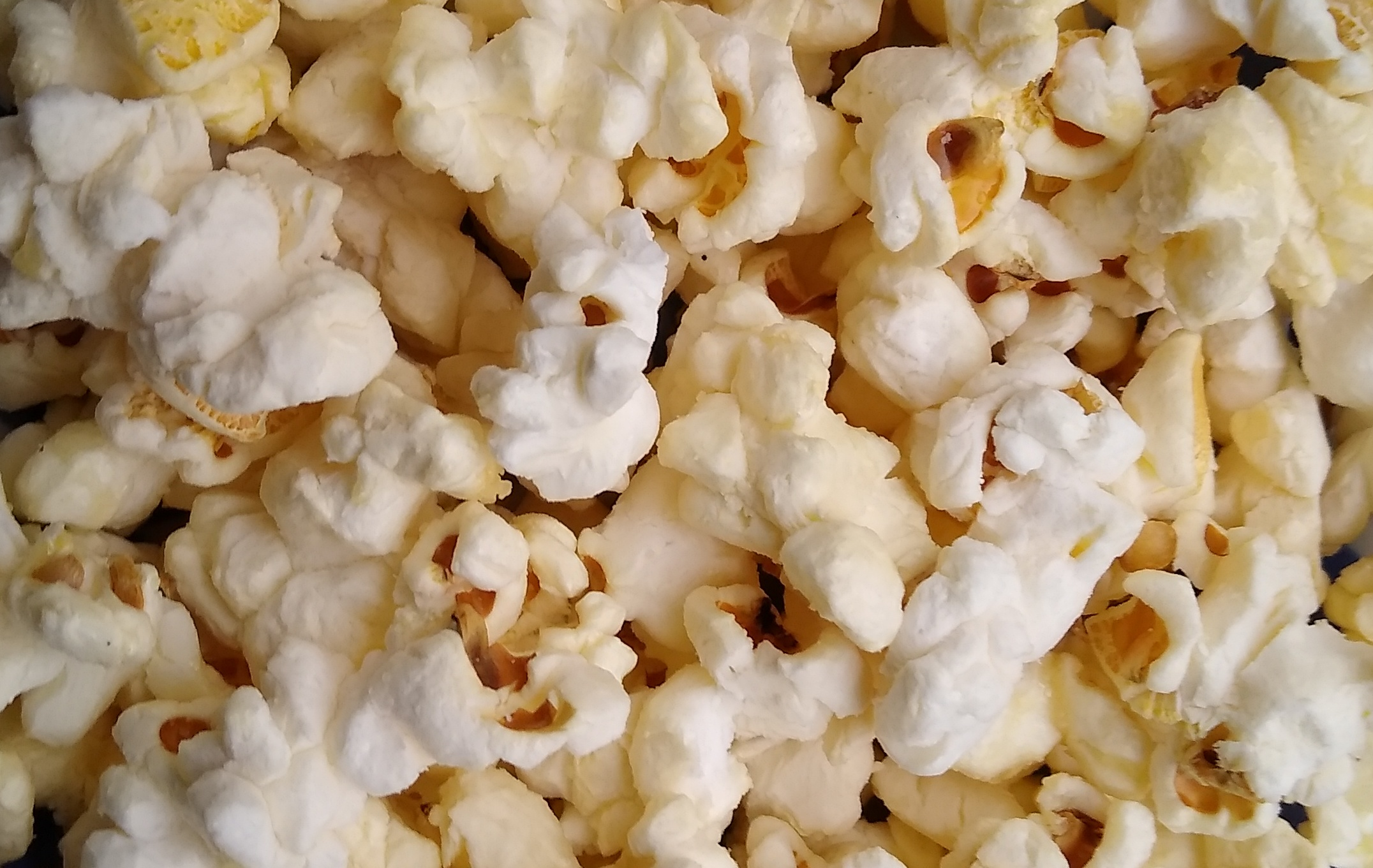
- Product type: Popcorn
- Current owner: KP Snacks
- Country: United Kingdom
- Introduced: 1914; 112 years ago
- Previous owners: Smiths

Butterkist is a brand of popcorn owned by British snack company KP Snacks. They are currently produced in Pontefract. As of 2025, it is Britain's best-selling brand of popcorn.

== History ==
In 1914, Fred Hoke and James Holcomb began to sell popcorn machines in Kentucky, United States under the brand of Butter-Kist. As their business developed, vendors began buying popcorn machines and the brand began to spread. In 1938 Butter-Kist machines made their way to the UK via an unknown route, developing the brand as in the United States through sales to cinema audiences.

After the Second World War, Craven Keiller developed a factory in York to sell Butterkist branded popcorn direct to cinema chains. Many items were rationed in the UK after the Second World War, but the basic ingredients of Butterkist were not. The brand developed into the UK's lead selling popcorn brand. The sales of the brand then followed the development and decline in cinema audiences, so that by 1998 sales were on another downturn and Craven Keiller sold the brand to Cadbury Trebor Bassett, which in 2000 merged the brand into its Monkhill Confectionery subsidiary and moved production to Pontefract, West Yorkshire.

As part of its development strategy selling off non-core brands, from April 2006 Cadbury Schweppes put Monkhill into a group of non-core brands it would review putting up for sale, and from June 2007 appointed investment bankers Investec to review the sale of Monkhill Confectionery, and its best selling brand Butterkist.

Butterkist, along with other Monkhill brands, was sold to Tangerine Confectionery in February 2008. The Butterkist brand was sold once again on 17 July 2017 to KP Snacks.

== Varieties ==
As of 2025, the following varieties were available:

- Salted
- Microwavable Salted
- Sweet
- Microwavable Sweet
- Sweet and Salty
- Microwavable Sweet and Salty
- Toffee
- Caramelised Biscuit

== See also ==
- List of popcorn brands
