= Ketchup chips =

Canadian snack food

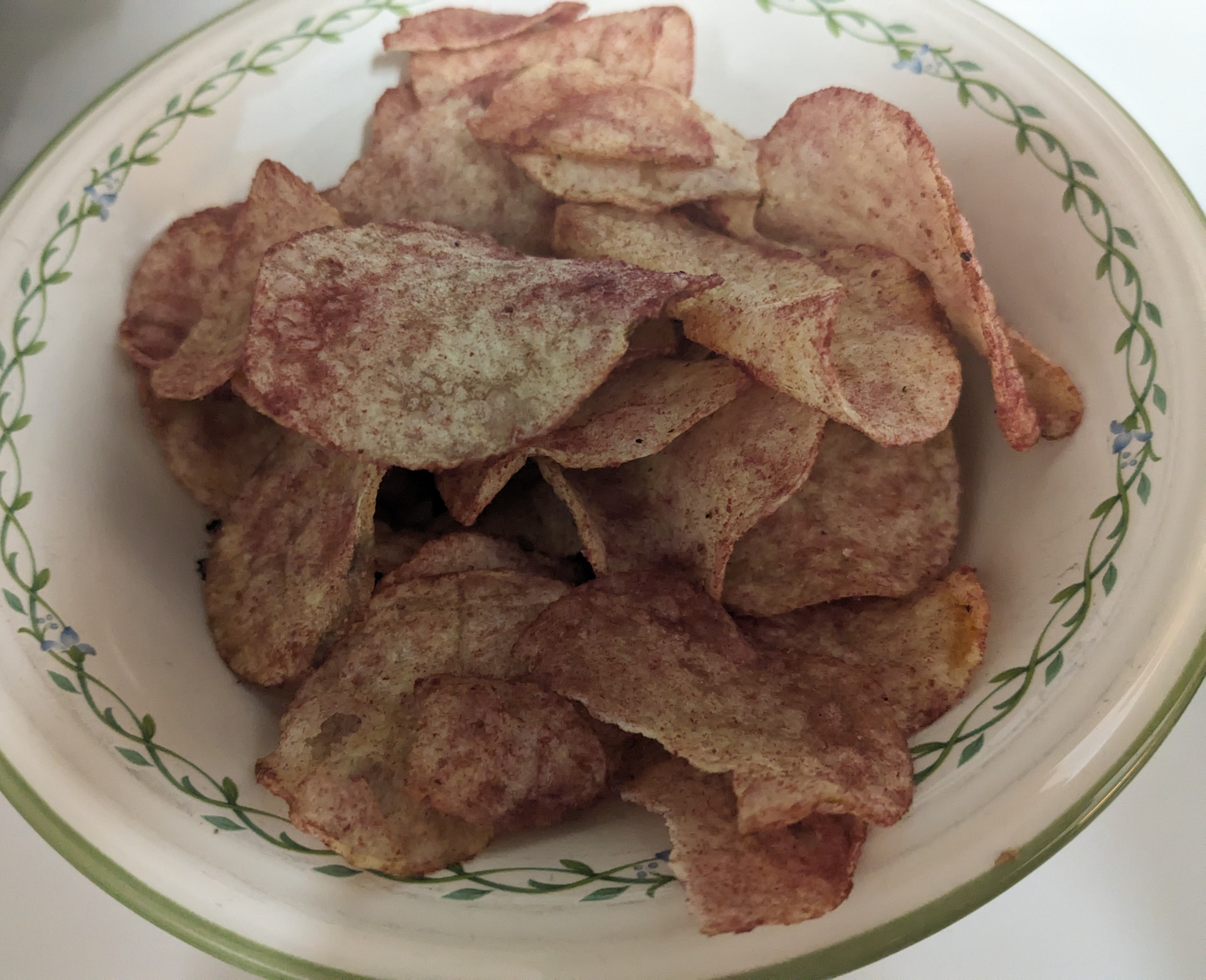
Bowl of Lay's ketchup potato chips

Ketchup chips are a potato-chip flavour introduced by the 1970s, primarily associated with Canada. An early variety was produced by Hostess Potato Chips, with indications of concurrent development by American firms such as Herr's. They became popular in Canadian markets, especially in Manitoba, and are produced by major companies like Frito-Lay as well as smaller regional manufacturers.

The seasoning blends tomato, sugar, and vinegar to create a tangy-sweet profile often described as "inspired" by ketchup, and sometimes compared to sweeter barbecue flavours. Ketchup chips are mostly available across Canadian grocery stores and have also been sold in the United Kingdom (through brands such as Tudor and Walkers) and in U.S. outlets, where they are occasionally priced above other snack options.

Ketchup chips have drawn different reactions from both food critics and the general public. Some regard the flavour as distinctive and enjoyable, while others find the taste unpleasantly unconventional or strong.

== History ==
The introduction of ketchup chips in Canada is typically attributed to Hostess Potato Chips, which began experimenting with producing new potato chip varieties in the early 1970s. Ketchup chips were the only one that proved profitable as other flavours like orange and grape were discontinued. Frito-Lay, the parent company of Hostess, did not provide a journalist with information that could prove it was the first to sell ketchup chips. He had spent three months trying to contact their research and development team. An earlier description of Smith's manufacturing a "tomato sauce flavour" crisps is given in an October 1968 advertisement in the Scottish newspaper the Montrose Review.

Herr's, an American company, sold ketchup chips by the 1980s. These chips may have been sold even earlier; if so, they would have been invented at the same time as Hostess. Herr's sold their chips in the United States, while Hostess only sold theirs in Canada. The flavour is popular in Canada, where it is considered Canadiana, though to a lesser degree than poutine or maple syrup. Millions of bags are produced each year by Frito-Lay. They are also sold by smaller companies like Covered Bridge. Ketchup chips are available in almost every Canadian grocery store and are strongly associated with Canadian identity. They are especially popular in the province of Manitoba.

== Flavour ==
The chip variety has been described as a "sweeter barbecue". According to a writer for The Takeout, ketchup chips do not truly taste like ketchup but instead comprise flavours reminiscent of it, like cooked tomatoes and sugar. A writer for Thrillist described them as tasting "like a bottle of ketchup was blown apart" and that this flavour was "dusted upon the chip in equal parts". The Daily Meal described ketchup chips as being "inspired" by ketchup rather than flavoured like it, comparing the product with Cool Ranch Doritos. One American journalist described them as tasting as if tomatoes "had been sprinkled with vinegar". Another journalist described ketchup chips as a combination between tomatoes and beet soup. Ketchup chips are not marketed with healthier variants, since diminished salt content and natural flavouring changes the taste of them significantly and therefore limits product innovation.

== International markets ==
While Americans pair french fries with ketchup, flavours popular in Canada such as ketchup chips are more vinegar-based in comparison to the United States. American chip varieties tend to be creamier. These flavour preferences are likely influenced by differing immigration trends and Canada's connection to the United Kingdom. For example, Canadians are more likely to pair white vinegar with fries, a combination that is commonplace in Britain but unusual in the United States.

There is limited production of ketchup chips in the United States in contrast to their much wider availability in Canada. Online retailers will sell ketchup chips to Americans for a significant markup. A 1984 newspaper article described ketchup chips as a failed business venture, with the exception of its popularity in Chicago. Old Dutch used to sell ketchup chips in both Canada and the United States but discontinued production in the American market after it failed to be profitable. Frito-Lay also does not sell its ketchup chips in the United States. Ketchup chips are instead produced by smaller companies like Herr's Snacks. The company initially used its own ketchup flavouring before switching to a Heinz partnership in the 1980s. The brand imports its variety to Canada.

Tudor Crisps sold a tomato ketchup chip flavour in the United Kingdom. Walkers later launched their own brand of ketchup chips in 2001, partnering with Heinz to produce the product. After being discontinued, the flavour was revived in 2025. In 2024, the company also released a limited edition sausage and ketchup flavour.

In South Africa, ketchup style condiment is referred to as tomato sauce. Simba Chips in South Africa (owned by PepsiCo), reintroduced Tomato Sauce flavoured chips in May 2025, after discontinuing them in 2021. The chips were previously All Gold Tomato Sauce flavour, but on re-introduction are Wellington's Tomato Sauce flavour. Smaller South African manufacturer Frimax also manufactures tomato sauce chips.

== Reception and popular culture ==
Debates about whether ketchup chips are an appealing snack often take place on the Internet. A 2012 survey of about 1,000 Canadians determined that ketchup chips were less strongly associated with Canada than salmon, poutine, back bacon, Timbits and Montreal bagels. In 2019, eight American journalists tried ketchup chips and ranked 13 brands, the top three of which were Doritos, Great Value, and Old Dutch. In April 2024, Chatelaine magazine ranked 11 ketchup chip brands in Canada.

During an interview covering the food preferences of actors Florence Pugh and Andrew Garfield, the two disagreed with each other about ketchup chips. Pugh believed the flavour had a similar taste to prawn cocktail chips, while Garfield disagreed with the accuracy of that comparison and described ketchup chips as weird and "kind of a sin".

In 2023, the Canadian Broadcasting Corporation reported that two Americans travelled from Virginia to Niagara Falls, Ontario, to purchase forty bags of ketchup chips, which went viral. A Canadian grocery store then shipped them nine cases of potato chips.

== See also ==
- All-dressed, another Canadian potato chip variety
- Dill pickle chip
- Salt and vinegar chip
- Hedgehog flavour crisps
- Samboy, an Australian brand of potato chips known for its "Atomic Tomato" flavour

== Sources ==
- Thiessen, Janis (2017). Snacks: A Canadian Food History. University of Manitoba Press. ISBN 9780887555275.
