= Pom-Bear =

Snack food brand

- Type: Snack
- Inception: 1987
- Manufacturer: Intersnack
- Available: Available
- Website: https://www.pom-baer.de/, https://www.pom-bear.co.uk/

Pom-Bear is a teddy bear shaped potato chip sold under the Chio brand. They are produced by Intersnack in Doetinchem, the Netherlands and are sold in over 30 European countries. They were first introduced in 1987 in Germany where they are known as Pom-Bär and were later introduced to the UK in 1990.

Pom-Bear come in three main flavours (original, cheese and onion, and salt and vinegar) as well as other regional varieties. Over the years the brand has also been sold in a variety of limited edition flavours and shapes, including pizza, ketchup style and snowmen.

In 2008, the British Consumers Association criticised the smiling bear mascot featured on Pom-Bear packaging for promoting unhealthy snacks to children. The manufacturer responded to growing concerns over unhealthy snacks by reducing the level of unsaturated fat in the product.

In 2010, a specially produced advertisement featuring a 3D Pom-Bear was shown before screenings of Shrek Forever After and Toy Story 3.

== See also ==
- List of snack foods by country
- List of fictional bears
