= Joe Murphy (inventor) =

Irish businessman and inventor (1923-2001)

- Born: 15 May 1923; The Liberties, Dublin, Ireland
- Died: 28 September 2001 (aged 78); Marbella, Spain
- Other name: "Spud"
- Known for: Founder of Tayto and inventing Cheese and Onion

Joseph Murphy was an Irish businessman and inventor, best known for being the founder of Tayto and inventing the cheese and onion-flavoured crisp.

== Early life ==
Murphy was born on 15 May 1923 to Thomas Murphy, a small business owner on Thomas Street and Mary James "Molly" Sweeney, who owned a wallpaper and paint shop on the same street. He had four siblings – three brothers and a sister. Growing up in the Liberties, he was educated by Christian Brothers on Synge Street.

== Career ==
In 1954, Murphy started the crisp company, Tayto, on O'Rahillys Parade. With his friend, Seamus Burke, he invented the cheese and onion crisp while mixing flavours at his kitchen table. Gaining success with the crisp, Murphy moved his company twice, first to Mount Pleasant Avenue and then to Harolds Cross. His company continued to experience a rapid growth, and in 1964, Beatrice Foods of Chicago bought a major share in the company. In the 1970s, it opened a factory in Coolock employing over 300 people. Tayto bought Smith Foods Group factory in Terenure in 1981 to develop new Tayto products.

After the great success of his company, Murphy sold Tayto in 1983 and lived his later years in Spain, where he died on 28 September 2001, at the age of 78.
