= Space Raiders (snack food) =

Brand of snack food

- Product type: Crisps
- Current owner: KP Snacks
- Country: United Kingdom
- Markets: United Kingdom

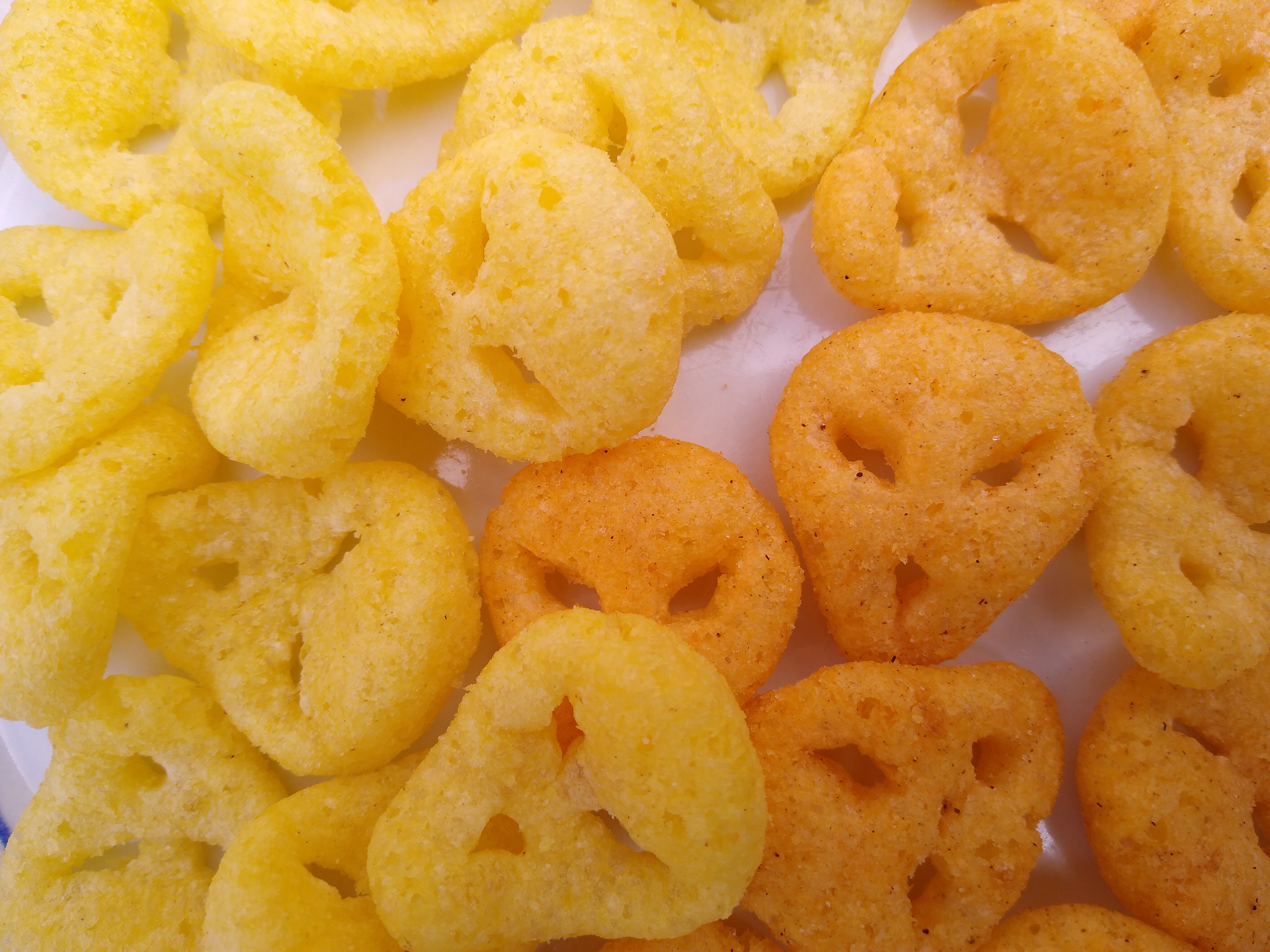
Pickled onion flavour (left) and saucy BBQ flavour (right)

Space Raiders are a British brand of corn snacks made by KP Snacks. Introduced in 1987, the alien shaped snacks are currently available in Beef, Pickled Onion, Saucy BBQ and Spicy flavours. The cheese flavour was discontinued in 2007, and the salt & vinegar flavour was discontinued in 2010.

== Pricing ==
Space Raiders were launched in 1987 at a retail price of 10 pence; this price remained until late October 2007, when it increased to 15p. It later increased to 25p before lowering to 20p. The price has continued to fluctuate, reflecting the volatility of the underlying commodity prices. At the time of the original 5p price rise, the company who owns Space Raiders are known as KP Snacks.

In October 2010, Space Raiders were relaunched in a new foil pack. These new packs were intended to 'increase shelf standout'. The ingredients were also changed. A new Saucy BBQ flavour variant was also announced. The packs were 20p each.

In 2019, the standard bag of Space Raiders was replaced with a new bigger 25 g pack with a RRP of 30p. The price marked packs feature a 'NEW BIGGER PACK!' banner.

== Comics ==
Until 2010 mini comic strips were featured on the back of the bags. They have over the years included the adventures of 'Astra and her Space Pirates' and stories of aliens being afraid of the crunching sounds from Space Raiders being eaten. Space Raiders now feature 4 different 'Space Raider Stats', one species for each flavour.

== Varieties ==
Flavour	Standard Bag (25g, has fluctuated)	£1.35 Sharing Bag (70g, originally 95g)	Multipack (10 x 11.8g, or 6 x 13g)	Grab Bag (45g)	Variety Box (various)
Beef	available	available	launched 2013	launched 2015	n/a
Pickled Onion	launched 1987	launched 2015	available	n/a	5 or 10 bags
Saucy BBQ	launched 2010	n/a	n/a	n/a	n/a
Spicy	available	n/a	n/a	n/a	n/a
Cheese	discontinued 2007	n/a	n/a	n/a	n/a
Salt & Vinegar	discontinued 2010	n/a	n/a	n/a	n/a

== Nutrition information ==
Typical Values	Pickled Onion Flavour Per 100g	Beef Flavour Per 100g
Energy	2033kJ	2065kJ
-	486kcal	493kcal
Fat	23g	23g
of which Saturates	2.1g	2.1g
Carbohydrate	61g	65g
of which Sugars	1.7g	3.5g
Fibre	3.1g	1g
Protein	5.6g	6.6g
Salt	1.6g	2.3g

== See also ==
- List of snack foods by country
