= All-dressed =

Canadian potato chip flavour

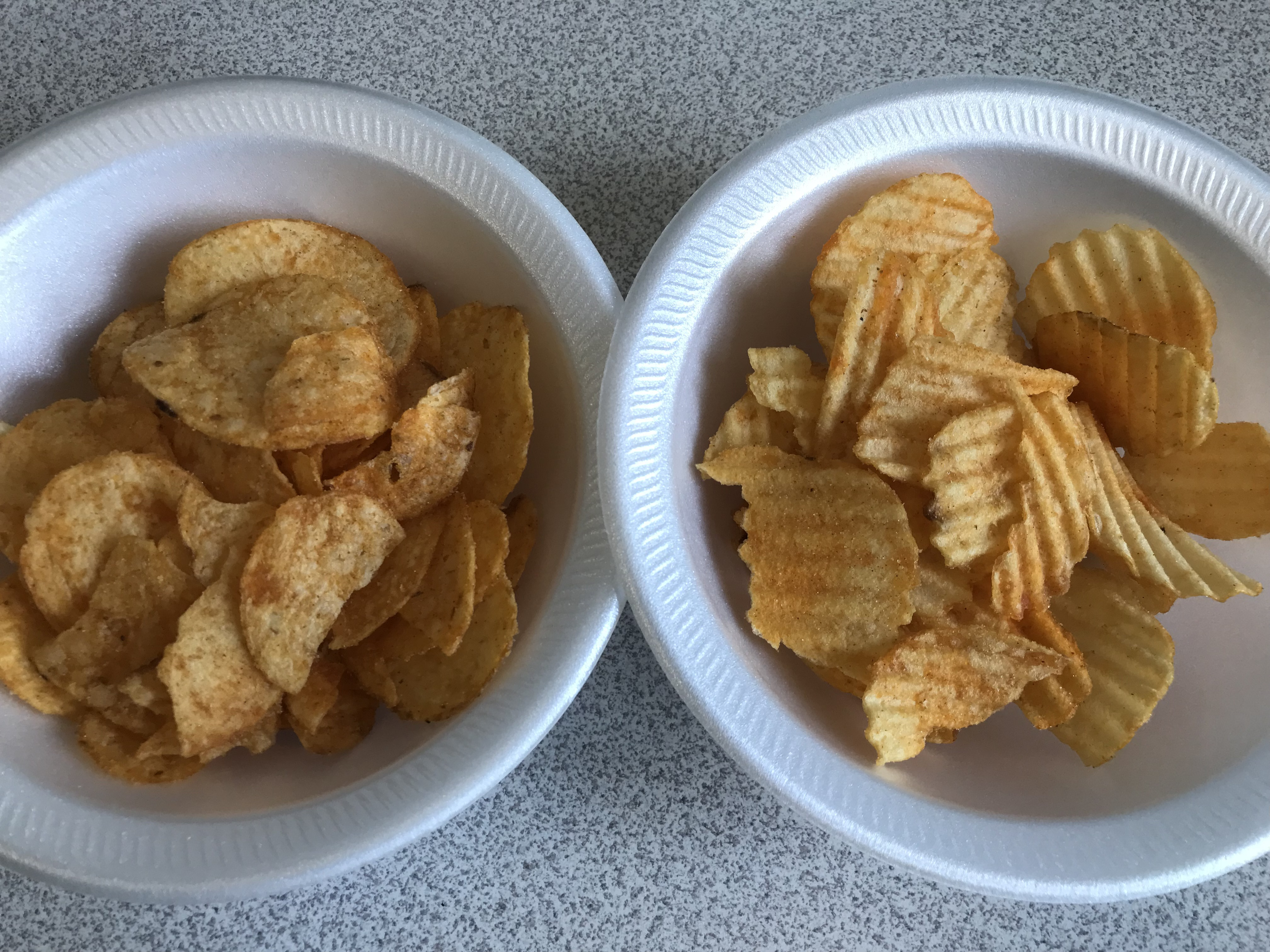
Kwik Trip's No Dip Required all-dressed chips (left) and Aldi's wavy all-dressed chips

All-dressed (French: assaisonnées or French: toute garnie) is a potato chip flavour popular in Canada. It is a combination of ketchup, BBQ, sour cream and onion, and salt and vinegar.

== History ==
A Canadian classic, the all-dressed potato chip. Yum Yum, a Quebec-based company, is known to have created a variety of the flavour in 1978. The term "all-dressed" and its French equivalent toute garnie originally applied to pizza, meaning roughly "everything-on-it", deluxe, or "the works".

The term "all-dressed" extended beyond just pizza and found its way into the world of potato chips, where it refers to a combination of several different flavors: ketchup, BBQ, sour cream and onion, and salt and vinegar. Many early references to the flavour all-dressed are linked to pizza flavour potato chips.

An all-dressed chip called The Whole Shabang is produced by American prison supplier Keefe Group. It became available to the general public in 2016. Frito-Lay began selling all-dressed Ruffles potato chips in the United States that same year. Co-op Food in the United Kingdom began selling a limited edition all dressed variety crisp as part of their Irresistible range in 2024.

Frito-Lay brought their All Dressed-flavoured Lay's potato chips to the United States for the first time in January 2025. The flavor was formally introduced during a Super Bowl 59 in-game commercial. The launch came with a sweepstakes that allowed entrants to enter for a chance to win an "All-dressed, All-Inclusive Vacation".

== See also ==
- Ketchup chip
- Canadian cuisine
