= Hula Hoops =

Snack food made from potatoes and corn

- Product type: Crisps
- Current owner: Intersnack
- Produced by: KP Snacks
- Country: United Kingdom
- Introduced: 1973; 53 years ago
- Markets: United Kingdom; Ireland; South Africa; Belgium
- Website: hulahoops.com

Hula Hoops are a British snack food made out of potatoes and corn in the shape of short, hollow cylinders. They were created in 1973 by KP Snacks of Rotherham, South Yorkshire. As well as being sold in Britain, they are sold in Ireland and South Africa, and are sold in Belgium under the fellow Intersnack label "Chio" (until 2024 under "Croky" of Mouscron). They were also sold in France beginning in 2016 under Intersnack's Vico brand.

== History ==
They were created in 1973 by KP Snacks of Rotherham, South Yorkshire.

== Flavours ==
Currently available flavours are:

- BBQ Beef (brown)
- Cheese & Onion (green)
- Original (red)
- Roast Chicken (mustard)
- Salt & Vinegar (blue)
- Smoky Bacon (purple)

Other flavours have included:

- Sweet Chilli (pink)
- Tikka (deep purple)
- Crisp Roulette (dark red)
- Tangy Cheese (light orange)

The following flavours were available for a short time, either because they tied-in with special promotions, or failed to meet sales expectations:

- Barbecue (brown)
- Beef and Mustard (black 'Big O's' & XL bag)
- Cheese (yellow)
- Prawn Cocktail (purple)
- Sour Cream and Chive (dark green)
- Bacon & Ketchup (blue)

== Composition ==
Each 24g (formerly 25g) multipack bag of the original Hula Hoops contains around 120 calories. They also contain 0.8g of protein, 15.4g of carbohydrates, 6g of fat, 0.5g of fibre, and 0.2g of sodium. These values vary between flavours.

== Promotion ==
In 2010, Hula Hoops partnered with Sport Relief to organize mass hula hoop displays. The Hoopathons were on Sunday 21 March, and 1,388 people took part to set a Guinness World Record-breaking largest number of people to hula-hoop simultaneously across the United Kingdom for two minutes.

== Variations ==
In 2008, KP started a variety made with corn called 'Hula Hoops Tortilla', which come in Cool Original, Chilli Salsa, and Nacho Cheese flavours.

Big O's
In 1998, KP launched 'Big O's' from Hula Hoops, using comedians Harry Enfield and Paul Whitehouse in their advertising campaign as their characters the Self-Righteous Brothers. Big O's were larger-than-normal Hula Hoops, packaged in larger bags and only available in Beef & Mustard flavour. The bag design used a black background featuring a large Big O's logo. A smaller Hula Hoops logo featured in the bottom-corner whilst the flavour was in the opposite bottom-corner. Big O's are no longer in production, nor available.
Shoks
For a short while in the early 2000s, KP produced Hula Hoops Shoks. These were miniature versions of the classic Hula Hoop, but had a much more intense flavour than the bags. They were packaged in either a stiff flexible plastic cube, or in a small resealable pot. The launch was first announced in March 2002, to be available in April, with KP claiming that the product would "revolutionise the snacks market". The company made a £4m investment in Shoks during the first eight weeks, with marketing controller Clare Robinson saying: "Complacency is not a Hula Hoops value and we wanted to rewrite some of the rules." According to the Morning Advertiser, Robinson said that consumer sampling had been "overwhelmingly successful". She added: "We've never experienced a reaction like it". Shoks were aimed at the 12 to 24-year old market, and KP estimated that they could earn over £10m in sales during its first year. They were available in the following flavours: Totally Cheesy (orange, cube), Beef (brown, pot), Pickled Onion (green, cube), Sweet Chilli (pink, cube or pot), Salt and Vinegar (blue, cube), and Rib and Saucy (purple, cube)
Hula Hoops XL
In 2001, KP launched Hula Hoops XL, which were larger-than-normal Hula Hoops, much like the previous Big O's incarnation. They were packaged in larger bags and were available in a limited range of flavours; however, they recorded poor sales and were soon dropped. Each bag was black with a large XL logo on the front, with the flavour overlaid. They were available in the following flavours: Beef & Mustard, Chili, Nacho cheese, and Curry
Frozen Hula Hoops
In late 1999, KP produced Hula Hoops that could be cooked at home. Frozen Hula hoops were not a crisp-based snack; instead, they resembled hash browns. They began production again in 2013 as part of a range of frozen versions of crisps, this time exclusive to Iceland stores. As of 2021, they are available in Original Salted (red) and BBQ Beef (brown).
Big Hoops
In 2011, XL had a successor, Big Hoops. Essentially the same design as the XL range, they were targeted towards adults who had memories of placing regular sized hoops onto their fingers, but could no longer do so. As of 2018, they were available in £1 price marked packs (87.4g) and 'Grab Bag' impulse packs (50g). 160g bags were once also produced. Big Hoops have been available in the following flavours: * Salted, formerly Original (red), Sour Cream & Chive (dark green) (discontinued), Sweet Chilli (pink) (discontinued), BBQ Beef (brown), Chilli (black) (discontinued), Spicy Chilli (magenta), and Salt & Vinegar (blue)
Puft
KP Snacks launched Hula Hoops Puft, a "lighter version" of the product, in early 2015. Available in a 20g "handy pack", the product came in a cheese flavour, which was said to be "a first for the brand". KP's trading controller in convenience Matt Collins commented: "Hula Hoops is an £83million brand and we are extremely excited to grow this further with an all-new concept. Hula Hoops Puft will bring to life the fun element of the brand, whilst engaging with those in search of a lighter snack. Innovation is incredibly important for our future product development and Hula Hoops Puft is a perfect example of this." Puft is a registered trademark. They are described on the packs as "Light and crispy puffed hoops". As of 2021, Puft is available in four flavours: Salted (red), Sweet Chili (purple), Salt & Vinegar (blue), and Beef (brown).
Flavarings
In May 2018, KP began production of Hula Hoops Flavarings in both Salt and Vinegar and Tangy Cheese flavours. Flavarings are a larger ring than standard Hula Hoops, and are maize-based, rather than potato, leading to a different texture, more akin Monster Munch than traditional Hula Hoops. They are described on the packets as "Big crispy bursts of flavour". As of 2021, the product is available in the following flavours: Tangy Cheese (yellow), Salt & Vinegar (blue), and Spicy (red).
