= Phileas Fogg snacks =

British food company

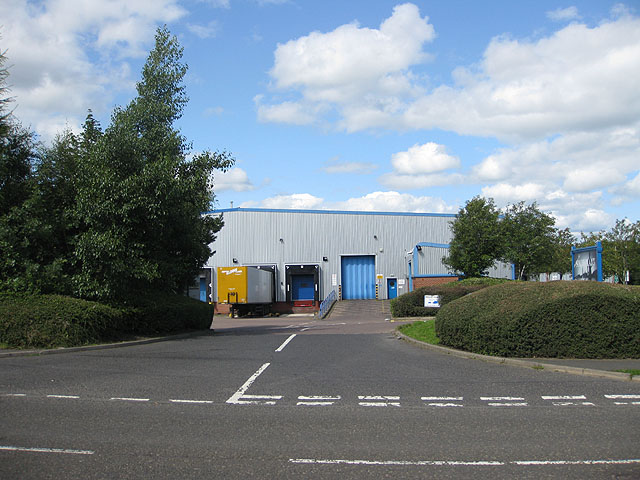
Entrance to the Phileas Fogg Factory

Phileas Fogg Ltd was a company that produced snack products in the United Kingdom, and was founded in 1982 by Derwent Valley Foods. The brand is named for Phileas Fogg, the protagonist of Jules Verne's Around the World in Eighty Days, and the products are made in Consett, County Durham. When Derwent Valley Foods was sold in 1993, its products were rebranded but poorly received, leading to a decline in popularity. The brand was relaunched in 2009.

== Early years ==
The Phileas Fogg snack range was launched in 1982 by Derwent Valley Foods, a company founded by Roger McKechnie, Keith Gill, Ray McGhee and John Pike, who invested £67,000 of their own money. The aim was to create a snack targeted to adults and branded with a recognisable character. The range included different flavours "from around the world" such as miniature garlic breads and tortilla chips.

== Decline in the 1990s ==
Between the late 1980s and early 1990s, Phileas Fogg snacks achieved a turnover of more than £30 million. In 1993, the brand was purchased by United Biscuits for £24 million. The four founders left after the sale while United Biscuits made significant changes to the packaging and identity, precipitating a decline in popularity.

== 2009 relaunch ==
United Biscuits relaunched the brand in 2009 after research showed a large number of British consumers were still aware of it. The relaunch placed emphasis on using authentic ingredients from different countries. In 2013, the brand was revised under new owners KP Snacks, with the new product line-up having more emphasis on being inspired by various countries instead. However this was short-lived and the range has again been discontinued, which KP Snacks have confirmed via their social media channels.
