= Tudor Crisps =

British snack manufacturer

Tudor Food Products Ltd
- Company type: Subsidiary
- Industry: Food
- Founded: 1947; 78 years ago in Sunderland, England
- Fate: Closed down by owners PepsiCo
- Area served: United Kingdom
- Products: Snack foods, potato chips
- Parent: PepsiCo

Tudor Crisps was a brand of potato crisps produced by Tudor Food Products. The business was started in Sunderland during 1947, and it supplied crisps to the North East of England and Scotland regions, claiming two thirds of the market in these regions. The company was purchased by Smiths Crisps in 1960. The brand continued under the ownership of Smith's by General Mills, Associated Biscuits and Nabisco, but was ended after PepsiCo purchased Smith's in 1989, and concentrated on the Walkers brand.

== History ==
By the mid-1950s, had opened a further factory in Sandyford, Newcastle upon Tyne and were planning a new 80,000 square feet factory at Peterlee in County Durham at the cost of £250,000. Tudor was acquired by the United Kingdom's biggest crisp manufacturer Smiths Crisps in 1960 for £1 million, with Smith's particularly keen on the new Peterlee factory and its modern US built machines that could produce 250 tons of crisps a week on one shift. Tudor was used by Smith's to trial new products, with Salt & Vinegar flavour being launched by Tudor before being introduced by Smith's to their own brand in 1966, and nationally in 1967. Other trials followed, including a meat flavoured crisp called Tudor-Ox in 1963; Chopstix, a potato stick flavoured with Eastern spices in 1964; Tags, a rice based smile shaped snack in 1968 and Mint sauce flavoured crisps. In 1966, parent company Smith's was purchased by American food manufacturer General Mills and a year later work was started on expanding the factory at Peterlee at a cost of £750,000.

The 1970s television advertisements featured a paper boy, bribed with a ‘canny bag of crisps’ to brave delivering his papers to a tall tower block (in reality Derwent Tower, Dunston, Tyne and Wear). In the 1980s, the ads gave cult status to their star, Allen Mechen, who played the adult paperboy who returned as an apparently successful and wealthy man, driving a Rolls-Royce car and eating a bag of Tudor Crisps. The twist in the tale was when he donned a chauffeur's cap in the finale.

In 1978, Smith's was sold by its parent company, General Mills to the British biscuit giant Associated Biscuits. Associated Biscuits was purchased by Nabisco in 1982, bringing Smith's under the same ownership as rival Walkers. The company announced a multimillion-pound development programme at Peterlee in the same year. In 1988, RJR Nabisco was purchased in a leverage buyout by Kohlberg Kravis Roberts & Co, and to reduce debt several business were sold to French conglomerate BSN, who quickly sold on Smith's and Walkers to PepsiCo in 1989. The Tudor Crisps brand was discontinued in 2003, when Walkers decided to focus on its core crisp range. The Peterlee factory stayed open until December 2017 when Walkers closed the facility citing productivity and efficiency savings with production moved to other UK facilities. The factory was purchased by Heather Mills in 2018, and in 2022 reopened as the home of vegan snack business VBites.

== Products ==
- Crisps including flavours like Gammon, Pickled Onion, Tomato Sauce, Spring Onion
- Flips - savory potato snacks
- Savoury Straws
- Special Edition Crisps - chocolate flavour
