= Potato chips =

Thinly sliced potatoes, deep-fried or baked

- A pile of kettle-cooked potato chips from Utz Brands
- Alternative names: Crisps (British and Irish English)
- Course: Snack, side dish
- Place of origin: England
- Serving temperature: Room temperature

Potato chips (North American and Australian English; often just chips) or crisps (British and Irish English) are thin slices of potato (or a thin deposit of potato paste) that have been deep-fried, baked, or air-fried until crunchy. They are commonly served as a snack, appetizer or side dish. Basic potato chips are cooked and salted; additional varieties are manufactured using various seasonings, flavorings and ingredients including herbs, spices, cheeses, other natural flavors, artificial flavors, and additives.

Potato chips form a large part of the snack food and convenience food market in Western countries. The global potato chip market generated total revenue of US$16.49 billion in 2005. This accounted for 35.5% of the total savory snacks market in that year (which was $46.1 billion overall).

== History ==
The earliest known recipe for potato chips is in the English cook William Kitchiner's book The Cook's Oracle published in 1817 in London, which was a bestseller in the United Kingdom and the United States. The 1822 edition's recipe for "Potatoes fried in Slices or Shavings" reads "peel large potatoes... cut them in shavings round and round, as you would peel a lemon; dry them well in a clean cloth, and fry them in lard or dripping". An 1825 British book about French cookery calls them "Pommes de Terre frites" (second recipe) and calls for thin slices of potato fried in "clarified butter or goose dripping", to be drained once crisp and sprinkled with salt. Later recipes for potato chips in the US are found in Mary Randolph's Virginia House-Wife (1824) and in N.K.M. Lee's Cook's Own Book (1832), both of which explicitly cite Kitchiner.

A popular legend associates the creation of potato chips with Saratoga Springs, New York, decades after the first recorded recipe. By the late nineteenth century, a popular version of the story, today known to be untrue, attributed the creation of potato chips to George Crum, a cook at Moon's Lake House who was trying to appease an unhappy customer on August 24, 1853. The customer kept sending back his French-fried potatoes, complaining that they were too thick, too "soggy", or not salted enough. Frustrated, Crum sliced several potatoes extremely thin, fried them to a crisp, and seasoned them with extra salt – to his surprise, the customer loved them. They soon came to be called "Saratoga Chips", a name that persisted into the mid-twentieth century. A version of this story was popularized in a 1973 national advertising campaign by St. Regis Paper Company which manufactured packaging for chips, claiming that Crum's customer was Cornelius Vanderbilt. The story is today known to be a myth, and historians and academics have identified a number of problems with the story: Vanderbilt was in Europe during the alleged encounter, the Moons didn't purchase the Lake House until 1854, and crispy fried potatoes were not unknown to Saratoga in 1853. However, the story remains frequently cited in popular media.

== Production ==
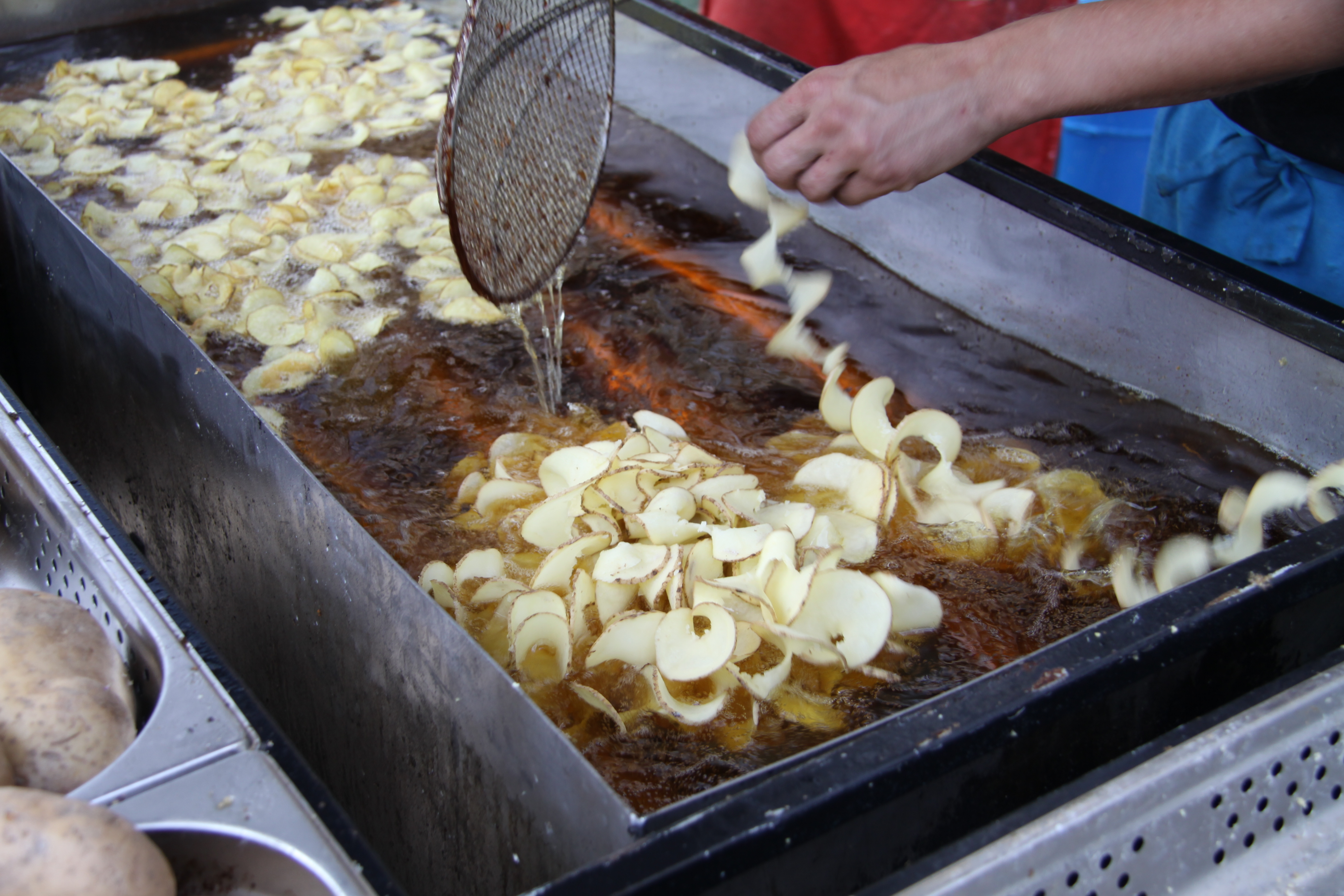
Homemade potato slices are deep-fried in hot oil for several minutes.

In the 20th century, potato chips spread beyond chef-cooked restaurant fare and began to be mass-produced for home consumption. The Dayton, Ohio-based Mikesell's Potato Chip Company, founded in 1910, identifies as the "oldest potato chip company in the United States". New Hampshire-based Granite State Potato Chip Factory, founded in 1905 and in operation until 2007, was one of America's first potato chip manufacturers.

=== Flavoring ===
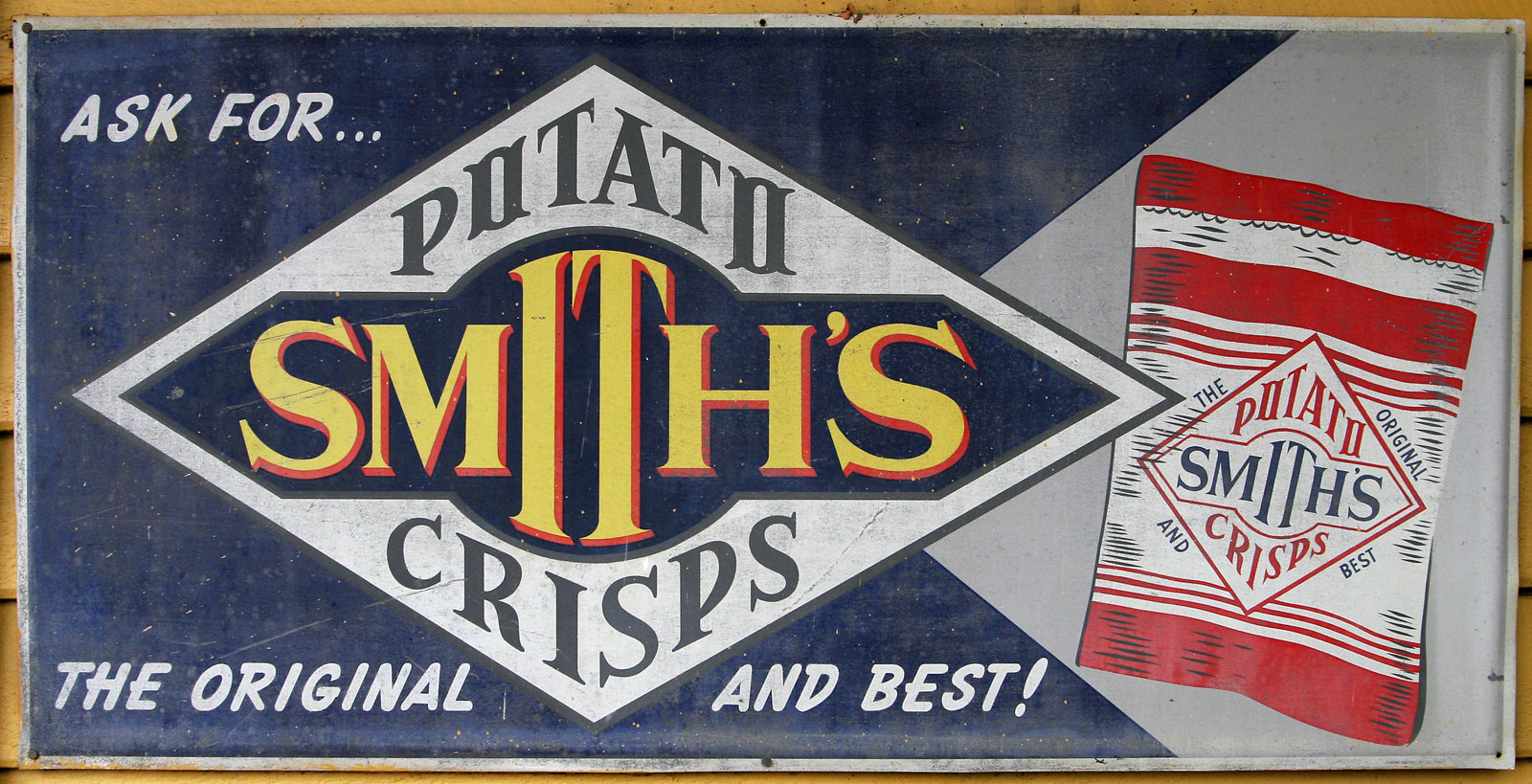
An advertisement for Smith's Potato Crisps

In an idea originated by the Smiths Potato Crisps Company Ltd, formed in 1920, Frank Smith packaged his chips in greaseproof paper bags and attached a twist of salt, and sold them around London. The potato chip remained otherwise unseasoned until the 1950s. After some trial and error, in 1954, Joe "Spud" Murphy, the owner of the Irish crisps company Tayto, and his employee Seamus Burke, produced the world's first seasoned chips: cheese & onion. Companies worldwide sought to buy the rights to Tayto's technique. Walkers of Leicester, England, produced cheese & onion the same year. Golden Wonder (Smith's main competitor at the time) also started to produce cheese & onion, and Smith's countered with salt & vinegar (tested first by their north-east England subsidiary Tudor and then launched nationally in 1967), starting a two-decade-long flavor war.

The first flavored chips in the United States, barbecue flavor, are also traced to 1954. In 1958, Herr's was the first company to introduce barbecue-flavored potato chips in Pennsylvania.

=== Packaging ===
In the 1920s, Laura Scudder, an entrepreneur in Monterey Park, California, started having her workers take home sheets of wax paper to iron into the form of bags, which were filled with chips at her factory the next day. This pioneering method reduced crumbling and kept the chips fresh and crisp longer. This innovation, along with the invention of cellophane, allowed potato chips to become a mass-market product.

=== Kettle-cooked chips ===
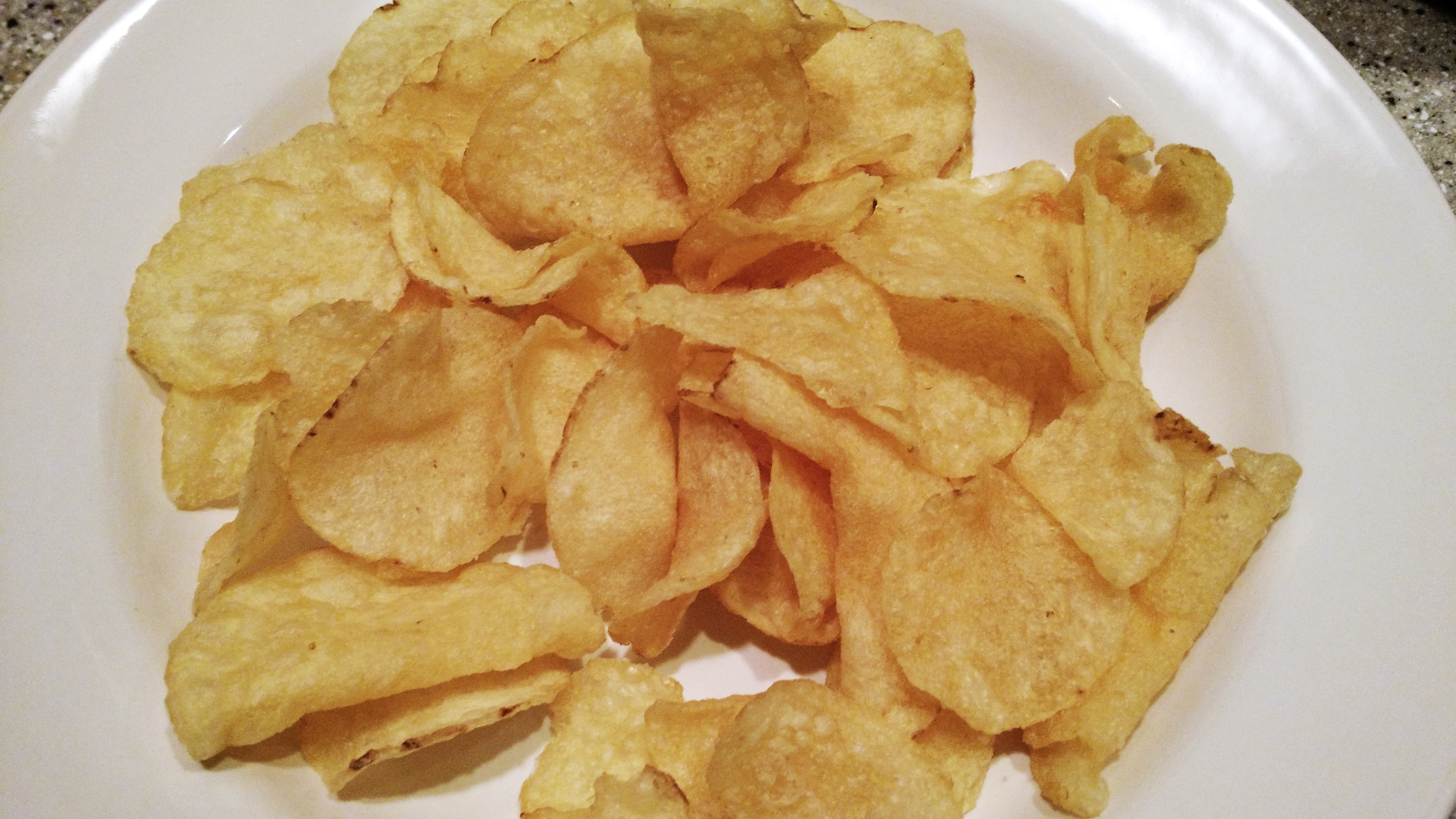
Kettle-cooked chips

Chips were long made in a batch process, where the potato slices are rinsed with cold water to remove starch, fried at a low temperature of 300 °F (150 °C), and continuously raked to prevent them from sticking together.

Industrial advances resulted in a shift to production by a continuous process, running the chips through a vat of hot oil and drying them in a conveyor process.

Some small producers continued to use a batch process, notably in Maui. In 1980, inspired by the Maui Chip, an entrepreneur started Cape Cod Potato Chips to produce thicker, batch-cooked "Hawaiian style" potato chips, which came to be known as kettle-style (US) or hand-cooked (UK) chips and became a premium, "gourmet" item. Kettle chips are thicker and the surface starch is not rinsed off, resulting in a style of chip called "hard-bite".

== Nomenclature ==
A Bangladeshi version of potato chips, marketed as "potato crackers"

Little consistency exists in the English-speaking world for the name of this food. North American English uses "chips", though Canadians may also call French fries, especially thick ones, "chips" as well. "Crisps" may be used for thin fried or baked products made from potato paste. An example of this type of snack is Pringles, which are marketed as "potato crisps" even in the United States. In the United Kingdom and Ireland they are called "crisps", whilst "chips" refers to french fries (as in "fish and chips").

== Health concerns ==
Most potato chips contain high levels of sodium, from salt. This has been linked to health issues such as high blood pressure. However, researchers at Queen Mary University of London in 2004 have noted that a small "bag of ready-salted crisps" contains less salt than a serving of many breakfast cereals, including "every brand of cornflakes on sale in the UK".

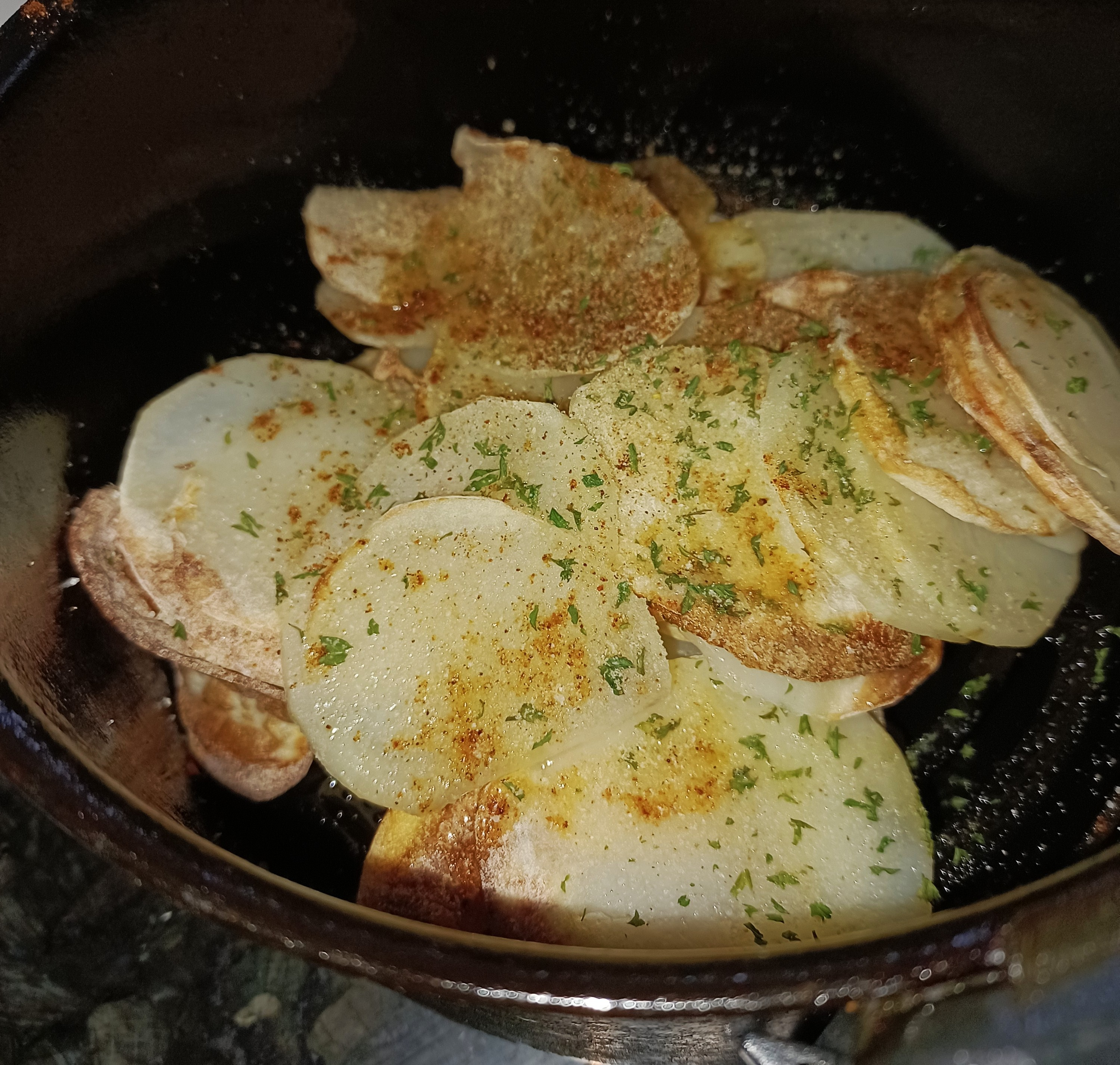
Since 2010, air frying has become a popular healthier alternative to deep frying, including in the preparation of homemade potato chips.

Some potato chip companies have responded to the long-standing concerns by investing in research and development to modify existing recipes and create health-conscious products. PepsiCo research shows that about 80% of salt on chips is not sensed by the tongue before being swallowed. Frito-Lay spent $414 million in 2009 on product development, including development of salt crystals that would reduce the salt content of Lay's potato chips without adversely affecting flavor.

Unsalted chips are available, e.g. the longstanding British brand Salt 'n' Shake, whose chips are not seasoned but instead include a small salt sachet in the bag for seasoning to taste. Many other popular brands in the United States, such as Frito-Lay, also offer such a product.

One health scare related to potato chips focused on acrylamide, which is produced when potatoes are fried or baked at high temperatures. This discovery in 2002 led to international health concerns. Subsequent research has however found that it is not likely that the acrylamides in burnt or well-cooked food cause cancer in humans; Cancer Research UK categorizes the idea that burnt food causes cancer as a "myth".

In August 2008, California Attorney General Jerry Brown announced a settlement with Frito-Lay, Kettle Foods, and Lance Inc., the makers of Cape Cod Potato Chips, for violating the state's Safe Drinking Water and Toxic Enforcement Act. The state had alleged in 2005 that potato chips from these companies failed to document that they contained high levels of acrylamide, which is listed by California since the 1990s as a carcinogen. These companies paid fines and agreed to reduce acrylamide levels to be under 275 parts per billion. Many potato chip manufacturers attempt to remove burned and thus potentially acrylamide-rich chips before the packaging process. Large scanners are used to eliminate chips worst affected by heat.

== Regional varieties ==
=== Americas ===
In the United States, major regional brands include Jays, Better Made, Old Dutch, Utz and Zapp's.

In Canada, regional varieties include all-dressed, dill pickle, and ketchup. Ketchup chips are flavored with tomato, garlic and onions.

In Colombia, lemon, chicken, chorizo, and sirloin steak with mushroom sauce flavored potato chips are sold.

=== UK and Ireland ===
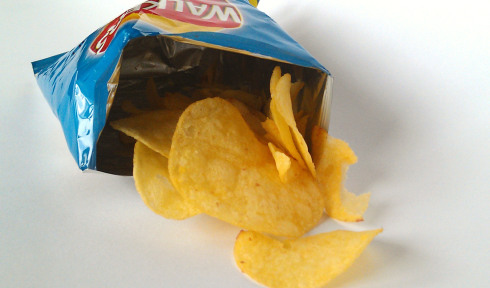
Walkers cheese & onion, voted the top flavor in a 2020 UK poll.

In the United Kingdom, while cheese & onion, salt & vinegar, prawn cocktail and ready salted rank high among flavors, major brands such as Walkers also make "cheese fondue", "BBQ and rib", and "sweet chilli" flavors. Since 2008, Walkers is also known for its "Do Us a Flavour" campaigns where the British public are asked to come up with unique flavors before the brand then produces the finalists which the public taste before voting on which one they want to become permanent.

In Ireland, the word "Tayto" is synonymous with potato chips after the Tayto brand, and can be used to describe all varieties of chips, including those not produced by Tayto.

=== Asia ===
In Japan, flavors include norishio (nori and salt), consommé, wasabi, soy sauce and butter, garlic, plum, barbecue, pizza, mayonnaise, and black pepper. Chili, scallop with butter, teriyaki, takoyaki, and yakitori chip flavors are also available. Major manufacturers include Calbee and Koikeya. In Hong Kong, the two prominent potato chips are the spicy "Ethnican" variety by Calbee, and barbecue by Jack 'n Jill.

In Indonesia, potato chips are commonly called kripik kentang and traditionally fell under the kripik category. The major brands are Indofood's Chitato (since 1990s) and Lay's (Frito-Lay). In 2014, Japan's Calbee and Indonesia's Wings Food formed Calbeewings, a joint venture and marketed Potabee potato chips offering two flavors: beef BBQ and grilled seaweed. Lay's potato chips sold in Indonesia are available in six flavors: honey butter, sour cream and onion, nori seaweed, beef barbecue, classic salty, and salmon teriyaki flavors. In 2018 Chitato launched three unusual flavors: beef rendang, fried crab golden egg yolk, and mango sticky rice.

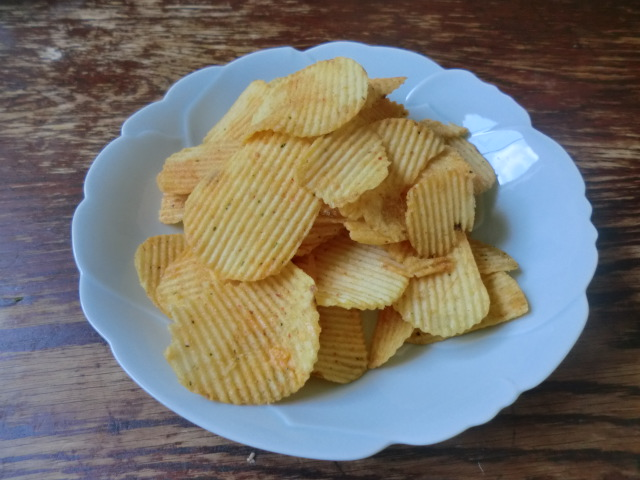
Bowl of pizza-flavored chips in Japan

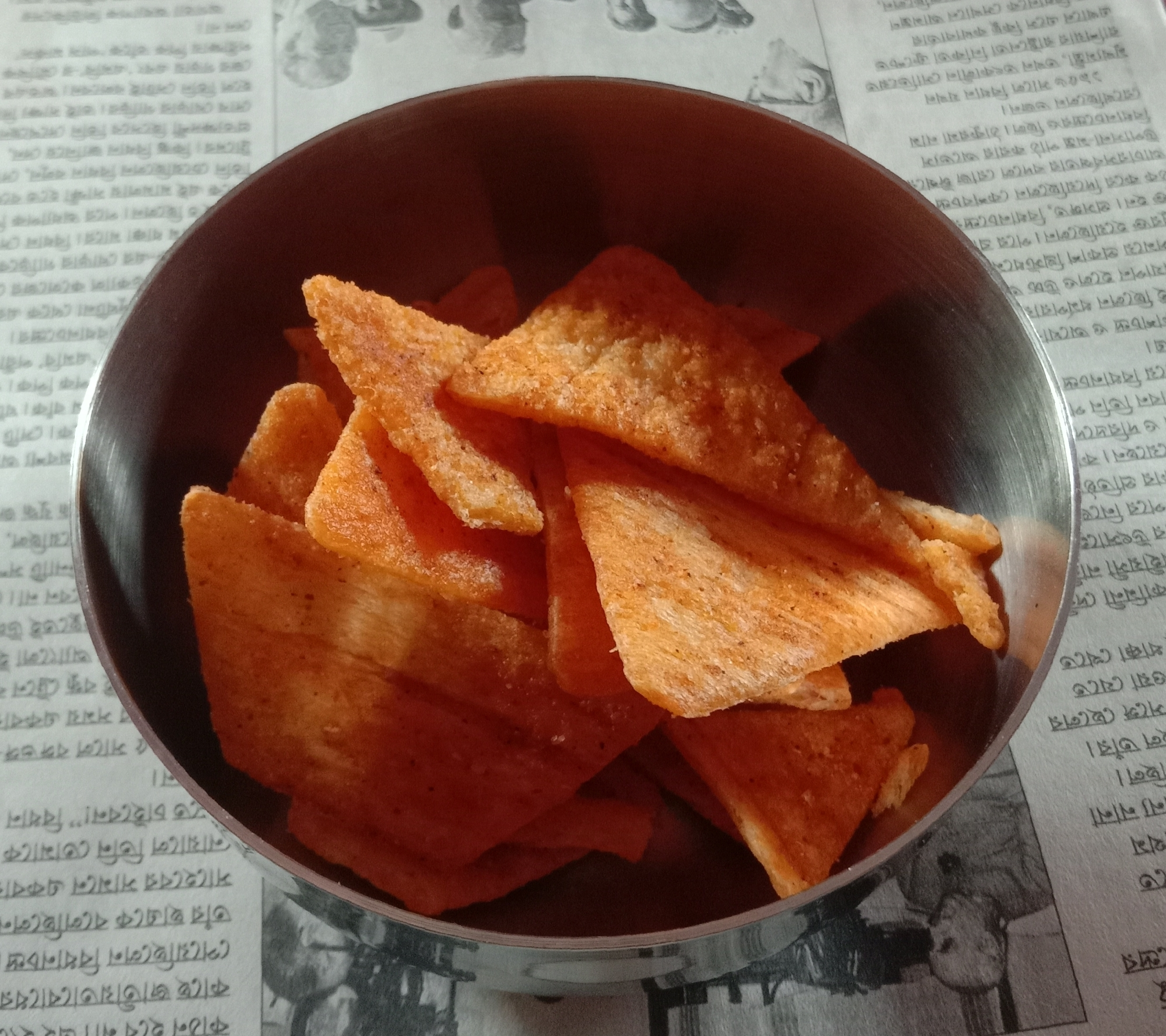
Triangle potato chips with Indian spicy flavors

== Similar foods ==
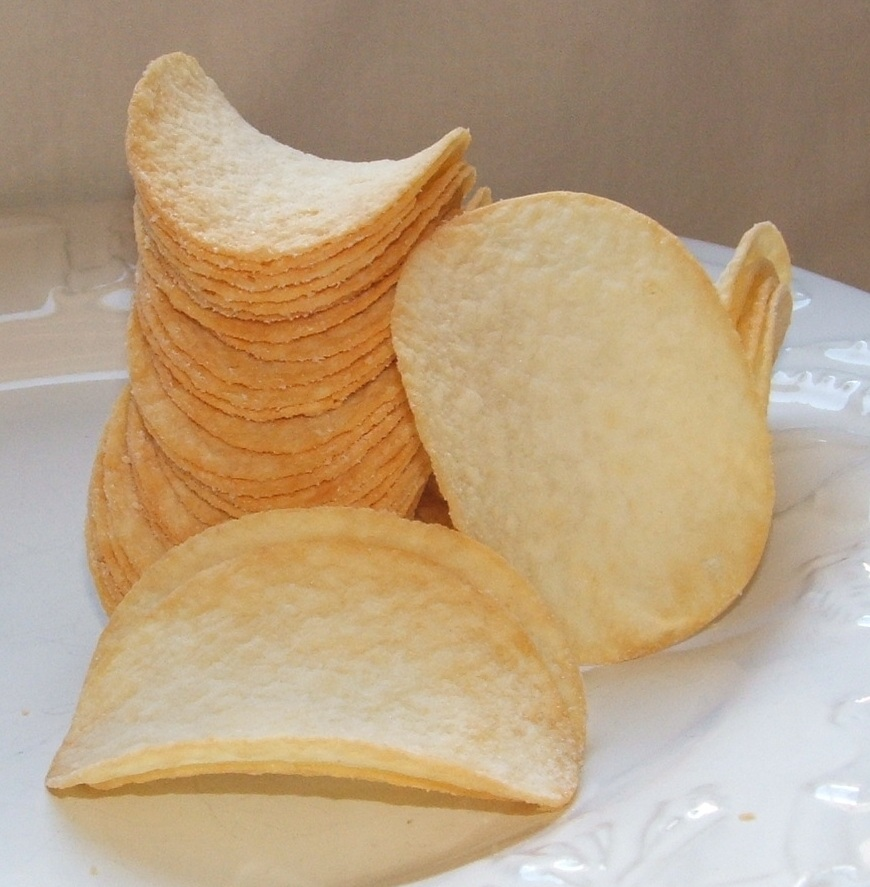
Pringles potato crisps are uniform in size and shape, which allows them to be stacked.

Another food made from potatoes, notably the Pringles and some Lay's brands, is made by extruding or pressing a dough made from dehydrated potato flour into the desired shape before frying. This makes a product that is uniform in size and shape. Pringles are officially branded as "potato crisps" in the US. Pringles may be termed "potato chips" in Britain.

Some companies have also marketed baked potato chips as an alternative with lower fat content. Additionally, some varieties of fat-free chips have been made using artificial, and indigestible, fat substitutes. These became well known in the media when an ingredient many contained, olestra, was linked in some individuals to abdominal discomfort and loose stools.

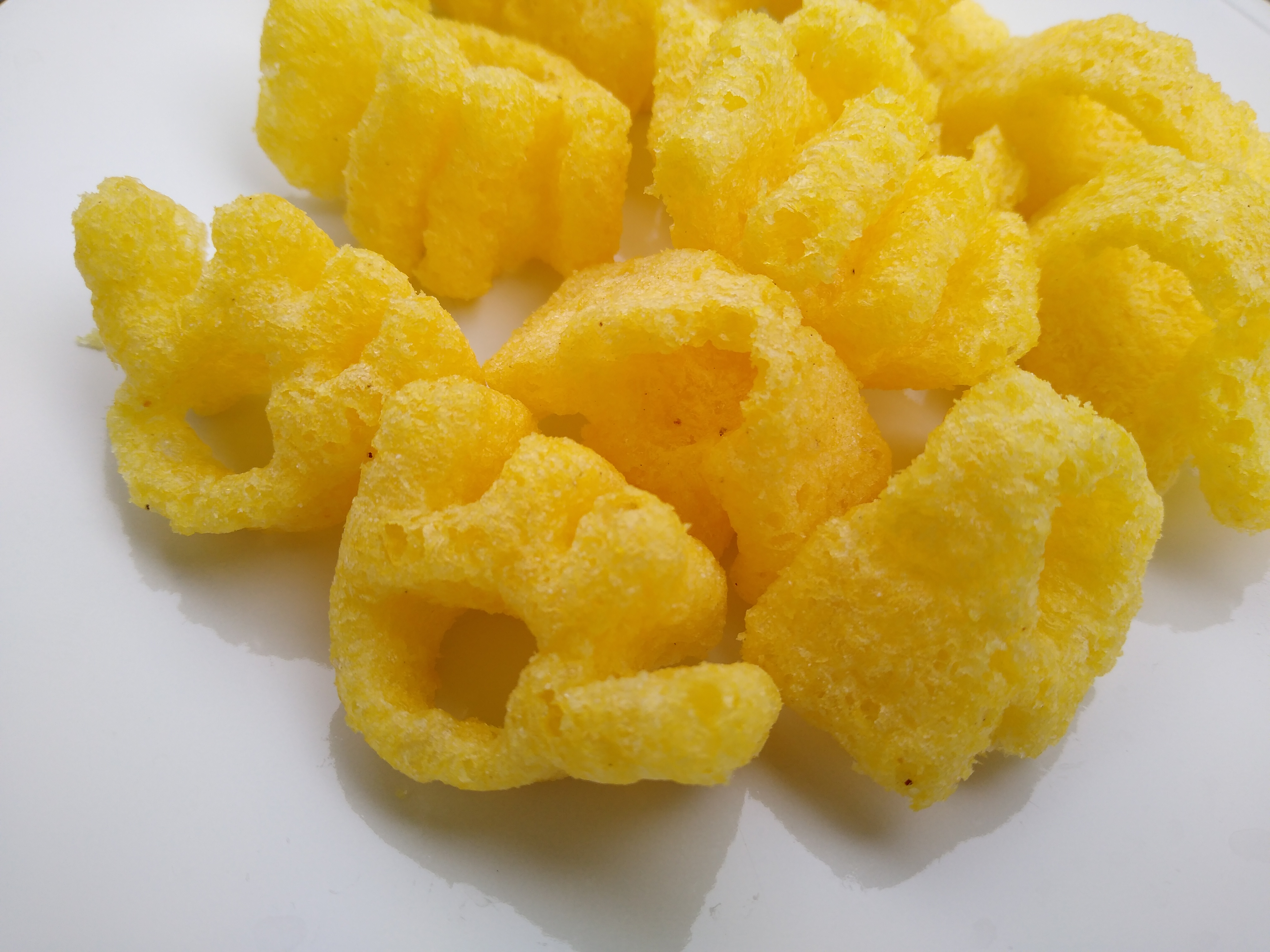
Although made from corn and not potato, Monster Munch are called crisps (potato chips) in Britain.

Many other products might be called "crisps" in Britain, but would not be classed as "potato chips" because they are not made with potato or are not chipped (for example, Wotsits, Quavers, Skips, Hula Hoops, and Monster Munch). British restaurant critic Tanya Gold argues that Monster Munch "is absolutely not a crisp".

Sweet potato chips are eaten in Korea, New Zealand, and Japan; parsnip, beetroot, and carrot crisps are available in the United Kingdom. India is famous for a large number of localized 'chips shops', selling not only potato chips, but also other varieties such as plantain chips, tapioca chips, yam chips, and even carrot chips. Plantain chips, also known as chifles or tostones, are also sold in the Western Hemisphere from Canada to Chile. In the Philippines, banana chips can be found sold at local stores. In Kenya, chips are made from arrowroot and cassava. In the United Kingdom, Sweden, Finland, and Australia, a new variety of Pringles made from rice was released in 2010 and marketed as lower in fat than its potato counterparts.

== See also ==
- Category:Brand name potato chips and crisps
- Chips and dip
- Corn chips
- Tornado potato
- List of deep fried foods
- List of potato dishes
- Papadam
- Vegetable chips
