= Kettle Foods =

American foods company based in Oregon

Kettle Foods, Inc.

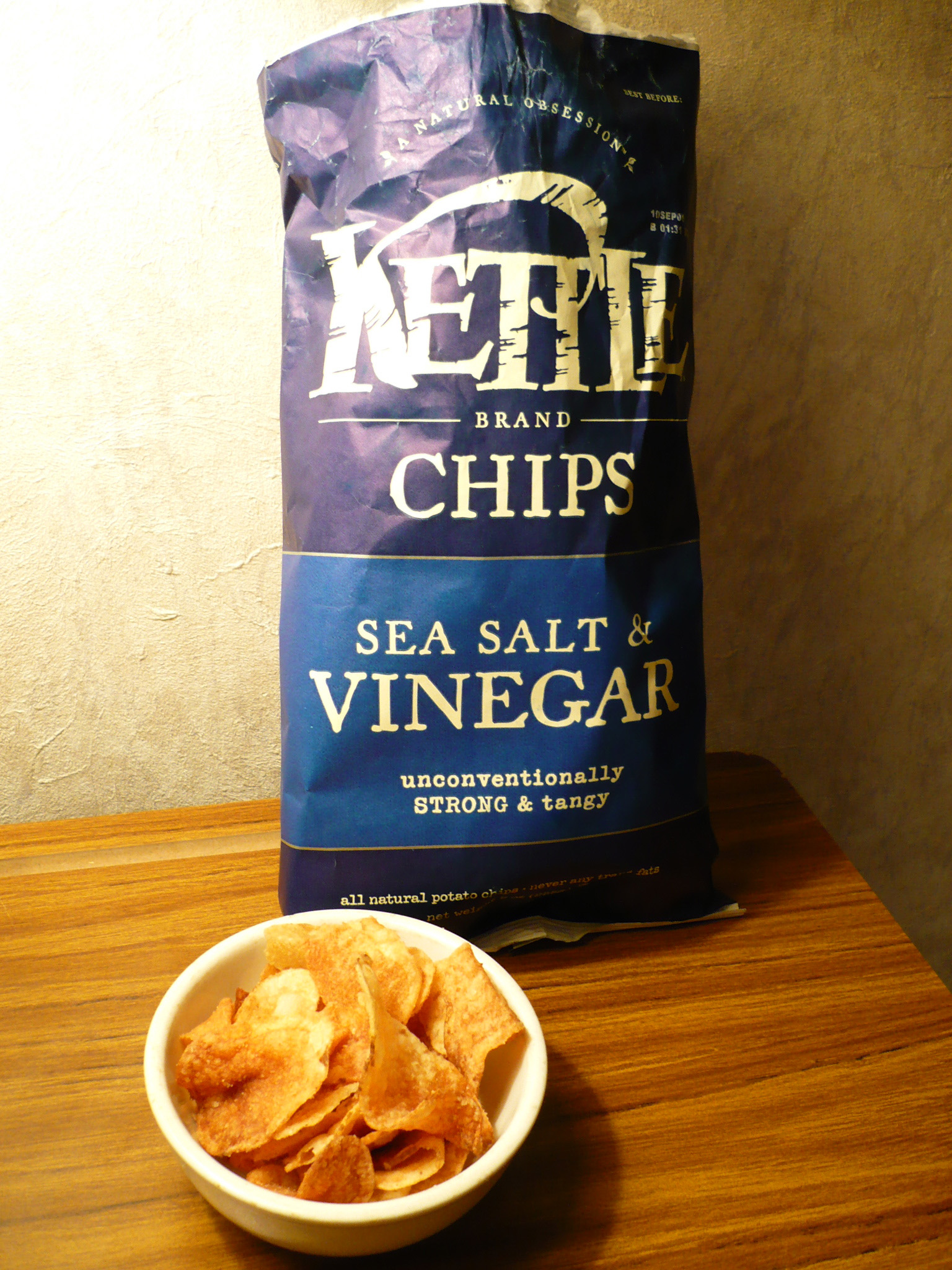
- A bag of sea salt and vinegar-flavored Kettle potato chips
- Product type: Potato chips
- Current owner: Campbell's (2018–present); Valeo Foods (Europe) (2019–present)
- Country: United States
- Introduced: 1978; 48 years ago (as N. S. Khalsa Company)
- Markets: United States, Canada, Europe, Middle East
- Previous owners: Snyder's-Lance (2016–2018); Diamond Foods (2010–2016); Lion Capital (2006–2010)
- Website: www.kettlebrand.com

Kettle Foods, Inc. is an American manufacturer of potato chips, based in Salem, Oregon, with a European and Middle East headquarters in Norwich, England. As of 2006, it was the largest natural potato chip brand in the United States.

The company, founded in 1977 by Cameron Healy as the "N. S. Khalsa Company", was previously sold to Lion Capital in 2006 and was owned by Diamond Foods from 2010 to 2016. In February 2016, Snyder's-Lance finalized its purchase of Diamond Foods. Snyder's-Lance (and its Kettle Foods division) was purchased by Campbell's in March 2018.

== History ==
The company was founded by Cameron Healy in 1977 as the "N. S. Khalsa Company", after Healy's Sikh name, Nirbhao Singh Khalsa. It produced its first potato chips in 1982.

In 1988, following a motorcycle trip taken by the company's founder and his son, Kettle Foods established a UK branch in a converted shoe factory in Norwich, England; the branch moved five years later to its current UK home, a newly built factory on the outskirts of Norwich.

In 2003, the company installed the largest solar array in the Pacific Northwest with the goal of using more green energy at its Salem plant.

The company was sold in 2006 to a British private equity group, Lion Capital LLP, for $280–320 million.

In September 2007, the company opened its second US production facility in Beloit, Wisconsin, after receiving $500,000 in state economic development money. Kettle built the first manufacturing plant to be awarded gold certification in the LEED program from the United States Green Building Council.

In October 2007, campaigns were launched on Facebook calling for a boycott of Kettle Foods products following allegations that the company was attempting to dissuade workers at its Norwich factory from joining the Unite trade union. The company denied the claim but acknowledged that it had taken advice from Omega Training, a UK subsidiary of the U.S. company The Burke Group, specialists in union avoidance.

In August 2008, California Attorney General Jerry Brown announced a settlement with Kettle Foods, the makers of Cape Cod Potato Chips, and Frito-Lay for violating the state's Safe Drinking Water and Toxic Enforcement Act. The state had alleged in 2005 that the potato chips from the companies failed to document that they contained high levels of acrylamide, a carcinogen. Kettle Foods paid $350,000 in civil penalties and costs and agreed to cut their potato chips' levels of acrylamide to 275 parts per billion by 2011, an 87% reduction.

Lion Capital put Kettle Foods up for sale in December 2009, with an asking price of around US$700 million and in February 2010 sold it for $615 million to California-based Diamond Foods, which owns brands such as Pop Secret popcorn. The sale was finalized the following month.

== Outside of the US and UK ==
The Kettle Foods UK office also supports a network of independent distributors through which Kettle Foods' products are made available to countries in Europe, the Middle East, and Southeast Asia, including Austria, Belgium, Denmark, Finland, France, Germany, Greece, Iceland, India, Ireland, Israel, Italy, Luxembourg, Malta, Malaysia, Netherlands, Norway, Portugal, Singapore, Spain, Switzerland, and Sweden.

Kettle Foods is unaffiliated with the Kettle Chip brand sold in Australia, which is owned by Snack Brands Australia.

== Potato chips ==
Kettle Foods is best-known for its potato chips, marketed as all-natural. The chips are fried using expeller-pressed high-monounsaturated safflower and/or sunflower and/or canola oil. The company has occasionally held contests to introduce new flavors. The 2006 contest winners were "Tuscan Three Cheese" and "Buffalo Bleu", a spicy, savory chip; past contest winners include "Cheddar Beer", "Jalapeno Jack" and "Spicy Thai".

=== Ingredients ===
As of 2016, the ingredients for the company's most basic chip ("Sea Salt") were: potatoes, safflower and/or sunflower and/or canola oil, sea salt. Many other flavors use ingredients like natural flavors, spices, citric acid, and yeast extract.

=== Flavors ===
The following is a list of potato chip flavors sold by the company (as of 2025):

==== United States ====
- Apple Cider Vinegar (Made with Avocado Oil)
- Backyard Barbeque
- Chamoy (Limited Edition)
- Dill Pickle (Krinkle Cut)
- Farmstand Ranch
- Habanero Lime (Krinkle Cut)
- Himalayan Sea Salt (Air Fried)
- Honey Dijon
- Jalapeño
- Jalapeño (Air Fried)
- Parmesan Garlic
- Pepperoncini
- Pink Salt
- Salt & Fresh Ground Pepper (Krinkle Cut)
- Sea Salt
- Sea Salt & Vinegar
- Sea Salt & Vinegar (Air Fried)
- Sea Salt Pink Peppercorn (Made with Avocado Oil)
- Special Sauce (Made with Avocado Oil)
- Texas BBQ (Air Fried)
- Truffle & Sea Salt (Krinkle Cut)
- Unsalted (Note: Limited editions.)

==== United Kingdom ====
- Crispy Bacon & Maple Syrup
- Gressingham Duck (Plum Sauce and Spring onion)
- Jalapeño Chilli
- Lightly Salted
- Mature Cheddar & Red Onion
- No Added Salt
- Sea Salt with Crushed Black Peppercorns
- Sea Salt & Balsamic Vinegar
- Smoky Barbecue
- Sour Cream and Onion
- Spicy Chilli
- Steakhouse Barbecue
- Sweet Chilli (& Sour Cream)

==== Rest of Europe and the Middle East, as of 2013 ====
- Sea Salt
- Honey Barbecue
- Sweet Chilli & Sour Cream
- Sour Cream & Sweet Onion
- Sea Salt, Rosemary & Garlic
- Crispy Bacon & Maple Syrup
- Mature Cheddar & Red Onion
- Sea Salt and Balsamic Vinegar
- Sea Salt & Crushed Black Pepper
- Chilli with Jalapeño & Red Chillies
