= Steve Bernard =

American adventurer and businessman

Steve Bernard (August 25, 1947 – March 7, 2009) was an American adventurer and businessman who co-founded Cape Cod Potato Chips with his older brother, Jude Bernard in 1980.

== Biography ==
Born on August 25, 1947, in Concord, New Hampshire, Bernard attended the University of Notre Dame, where he earned a degree in economics. An avid adventurer, he spent the decade following his graduation hitchhiking across the country, fighting forest fires in Alaska, sailing trough the Caribbean, working on chicken farms, and installing car sunroofs.

=== Cape Cod Potato Chips ===
With the idea of offering healthier foods made with little processing, his wife, Lynn, had started a natural foods store in the 1970s. Bernard pursued adding potato chips to the mix after tasting a natural potato chip from a successful company based in Hawaii. In 1980, he sold his auto parts business and officially established Cape Cod Potato Chips. He opened an 800-square-foot (74 m^{2}) storefront in Hyannis, Massachusetts, to target tourists. At the time, his only equipment was an industrial potato slicer he had bought for $3,000. He had almost no knowledge of the snack food business other than what he learned in a week-long course on potato chip making at Martin's Potato Chips in Thomasville, Pennsylvania.

Unlike typical commercial brands made using a continuous frying process, in which potato slices travel through a tub of oil on a conveyor belt, Cape Cod chips are cooked in batches in kettles, frying them in a shallow vat in oil while stirring with a rake, producing a crunchier chip. Snack Food Association president James A. McCarthy noted that Bernard "didn't invent the kettle chip, but he was involved in bringing it back to prominence."

The company struggled for months after opening on July 4, 1980. In January of 1981, a man had a fatal heart attack, driving his car, causing it to crash through the front window of the store, almost hitting Bernard’s daughter, Nicole. An insurance payment and publicity from the accident helped tide the company over until the following summer, by which time business was booming, and the company's chips were being sold through a number of supermarket chains.

The company was acquired by Anheuser-Busch in April 1985, for roughly $7 million. It operated as a division of its former unit, Eagle Snacks. Sales of the chips were up to 80,000 bags a day by the end of the following year, reaching the entire East Coast, with sales of $16 million annually. Bernard bought the company and its factory back from Anheuser-Busch for approximately $2.8 million in 1996. Snack food company Lance Inc. bought the company from Bernard in 1996, by which time annual sales had reached $30 million.

=== Personal ===
Bernard and his wife Lynn started a sandwich shop which led to the creation of Chatham Village Market, a company that sold packaged croutons, seasoned and made from leftover bread. Bernard later sold the company to T. Marzetti Company in 1997. Lured out of "retirement" by his daughter, Nicole, the two co-founded Late July Organic Snacks, a company that produces organic cookies and crackers, in 2001. Nicole sold the company in early 2008.

A resident of Marstons Mills, Massachusetts, and Sanibel, Florida, Bernard died from pancreatic cancer at age 61 on March 7, 2009, in Hyannis, Massachusetts. He was survived by his wife, his daughter and two grandchildren, as well as three brothers and a sister.
