= Central Trust Company =

- U.S. National Register of Historic Places
- New Jersey Register of Historic Places
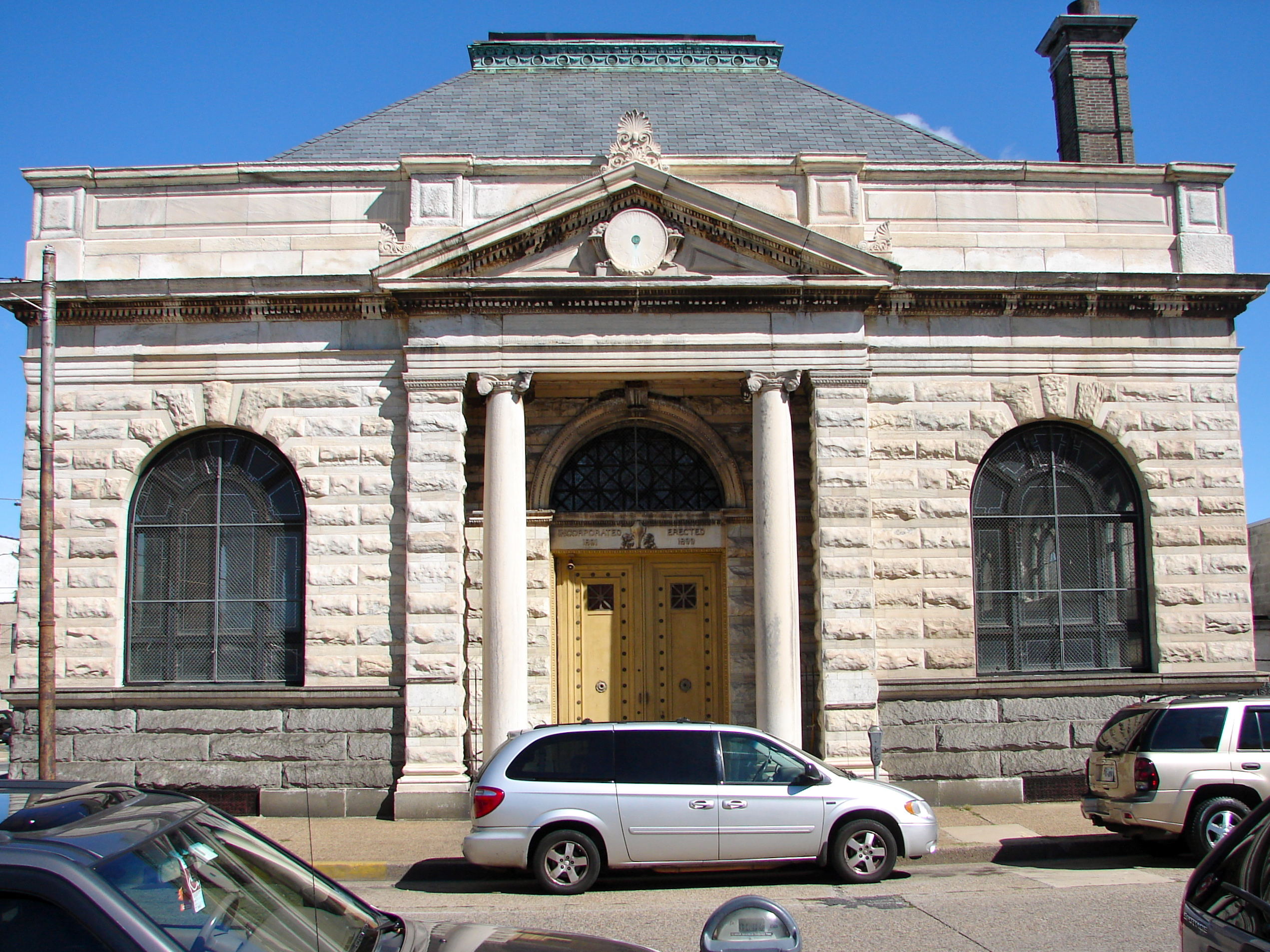

- Location within Camden County, New Jersey Location within New Jersey Location within the United States
- Location: 401 Federal Street, Camden, New Jersey
- Coordinates: 39°56′39″N 75°7′24″W
- Built: 1899
- Built by: George F. Bachman
- Architect: Thomas Stephen
- Architectural style: Late 19th And 20th Century Revivals, Second Renaissance Revival
- MPS: Banks, Insurance, and Legal Buildings in Camden, New Jersey, 1873–1938 MPS
- NRHP reference No.: 90001253
- NJRHP No.: 896

Significant dates
- Added to NRHP: January 5, 2005
- Designated NJRHP: January 11, 1990

The Central Trust Company building is located at 401 Federal Street in the city of Camden in Camden County, New Jersey, United States. It was built in 1899 and was added to the National Register of Historic Places on January 5, 2005, for its significance in architecture and economics. The bank is part of the Banks, Insurance, and Legal Buildings in Camden, New Jersey, 1873–1938 Multiple Property Submission (MPS). In 1947, the Equitable Beneficial Insurance company moved here.

The Central Trust Company was organized in 1891 by Abraham Anderson and other Camden businessmen. Anderson had previously partnered with Joseph A. Campbell to found Campbell's. In 1899, the company hired local architect Thomas Stephen to design a new building. The marble building features Beaux-Arts architecture with its Second Renaissance Revival design.

== See also ==
- National Register of Historic Places listings in Camden County, New Jersey
