= Labels for Education =

Labels for Education was a marketing program begun in 1973 by the Campbell's in the United States, and later also in Canada. The program allowed schools to earn books, musical instruments, computers, and other school supplies in exchange for labels or Universal Product Codes (UPCs) on associated products. In 2013, five companies participated in the program: Campbell Soup Company, Diamond Foods, Post Foods, Société Bic, and The Dannon Company (the American division of Groupe Danone). In addition, the Glad brand is also a member of this program.

Starting in 1996, the program found competition from "Box Tops for Education," a competitor created by the General Mills corporation that quickly eclipsed the labels program. In 2019, that program announced it would retire the program for an app.

The Campbell's Soup Company announced in February 2016 it would be ending the Labels for Education program, citing declining participation. After July 31, 2016, no new schools could enroll in the program, and only UPCs with the Labels for Education logo would be valid for redemption. The associated companies stated they would begin removing the Labels for Education logo in mid-2016 and expected there will be a limited number of products that contain these labels in stores through 2017. However, the banked points schools have accumulated will not be affected. In total, the program had contributed $110 million in school supplies over the 42 years of operation. Campbell's also announced the end of its Labels for Education program in Canada in 2016.
