= Cape Cod Potato Chips =

American snack food company

Coordinates: 41°40′50.99″N 70°17′40.46″W

- Type: Private (1980–85, 1996-99); Subsidiary (1985–96, 1999–present)
- Founded: July 4, 1980; 46 years ago
- Founder: Steve Bernard
- Headquarters: Hyannis, Massachusetts, U.S.
- Products: Snack foods
- Parent: The Campbell's Company (2018–present); Snyder's-Lance (1999–2018); Anheuser-Busch (1985–1996)
- Website: capecodchips.com

Cape Cod Potato Chips is an American snack food company best known for their brand of kettle-cooked potato chips. The company is headquartered in Hyannis, Massachusetts, on Cape Cod. Cape Cod Potato Chips is a brand owned by Campbell's since 2018.

== History ==
Cape Cod Potato Chips was founded in 1980 by Steve Bernard and his brother, Jude, with the idea of offering healthier foods made with little processing. Steve's wife, Lynn, had opened the store Ardklin Natural Foods in Harwich in the 1970s. Bernard lamented the lack of healthy snacks. He pursued adding potato chips to the mix after tasting a natural potato chip from a successful company based in Hawaii. In 1980, he sold his auto parts business for a potato chip business. He bought an 800-square-foot (74 m^{2}) storefront in Hyannis, Massachusetts, in a prime place to reach tourists, as well as an industrial potato slicer for $3,000. He had almost no knowledge of the snack food business other than what he learned in a week-long course on potato chip making at Martin's Potato Chips in Thomasville, Pennsylvania.

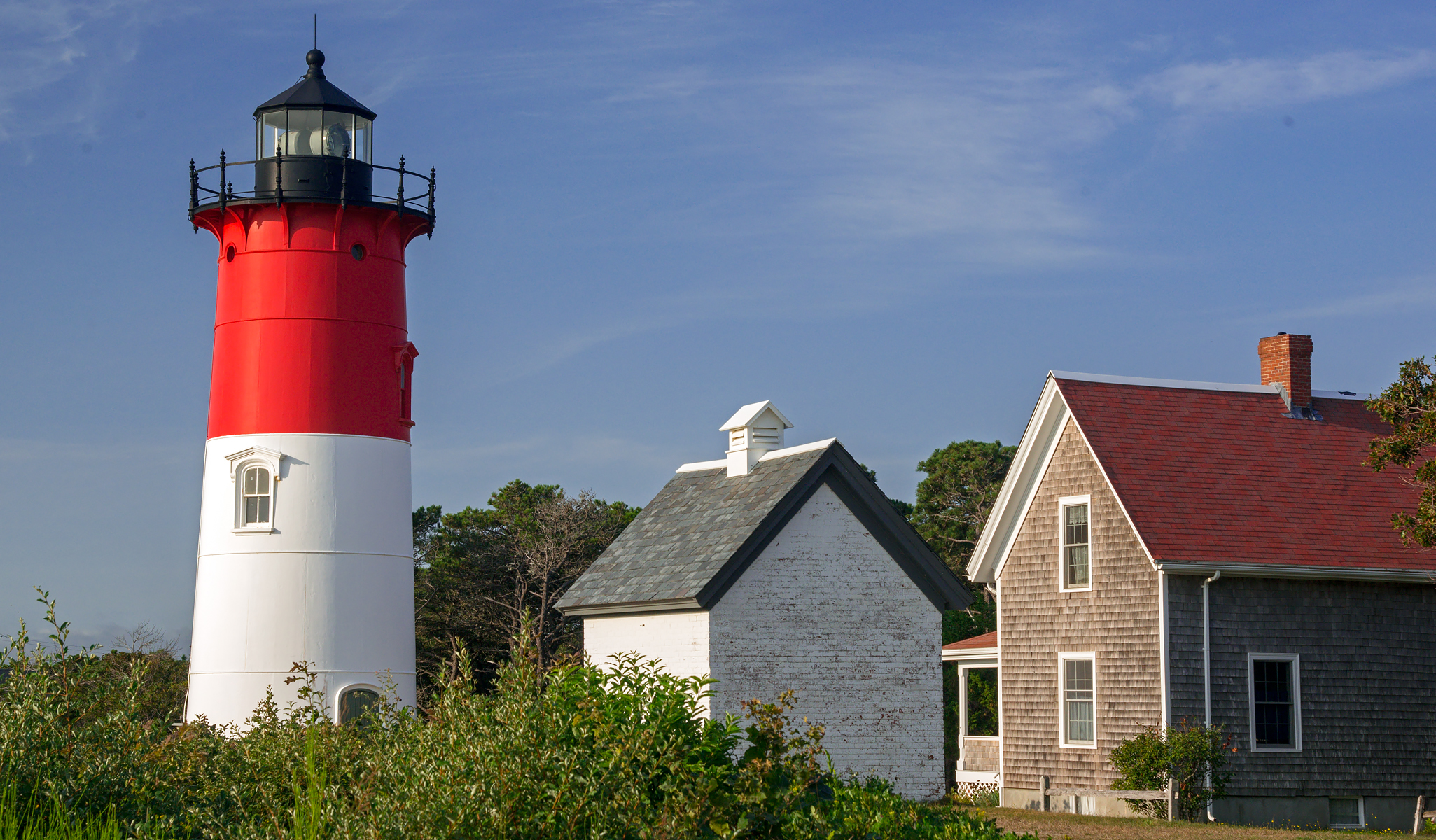
Nauset Light (2015), the inspiration for the company's logo

Unlike typical commercial brands made using a continuous frying process, in which potato slices travel through a tub of oil on a conveyor belt, Cape Cod chips are cooked in batches in kettles, frying them in a shallow vat in oil while stirring with a rake, producing a crunchier chip. Snack Food Association president James A. McCarthy noted that Bernard "didn't invent the kettle chip, but he was involved in bringing it back to prominence." Before the 1920s, this was the way potato chips had been made.

The company struggled for months after it opened on July 4, 1980. The following winter a car crashed through the front window of the store, just missing Steve's daughter and wife. An insurance payment and publicity from the accident helped tide the company over until the following summer, by which time sales were substantial, and the company's chips were being sold through a number of supermarket chains.

The company was acquired by Anheuser-Busch in 1985, and operated as a division of its Eagle Snacks unit. Sales of the chips were up to 80,000 bags a day by the end of the following year, reaching the entire East Coast, with sales of $16 million annually. Bernard bought the company and its factory back from Anheuser-Busch in 1996 with capital from Stolberg Partners. Snack food company Lance Inc. bought the company from Bernard in 1999, by which time annual sales had reached $30 million. In 2010, Lance Inc. merged with Snyder's of Hanover, creating Snyder's-Lance. The Campbell Soup Co. would later go on to acquire Snyder's-Lance in December 2017.

In 2026, Campbell's announced the closure of the Hyannis factory, meaning that the chips will no longer be produced on their namesake cape.

== In popular culture ==
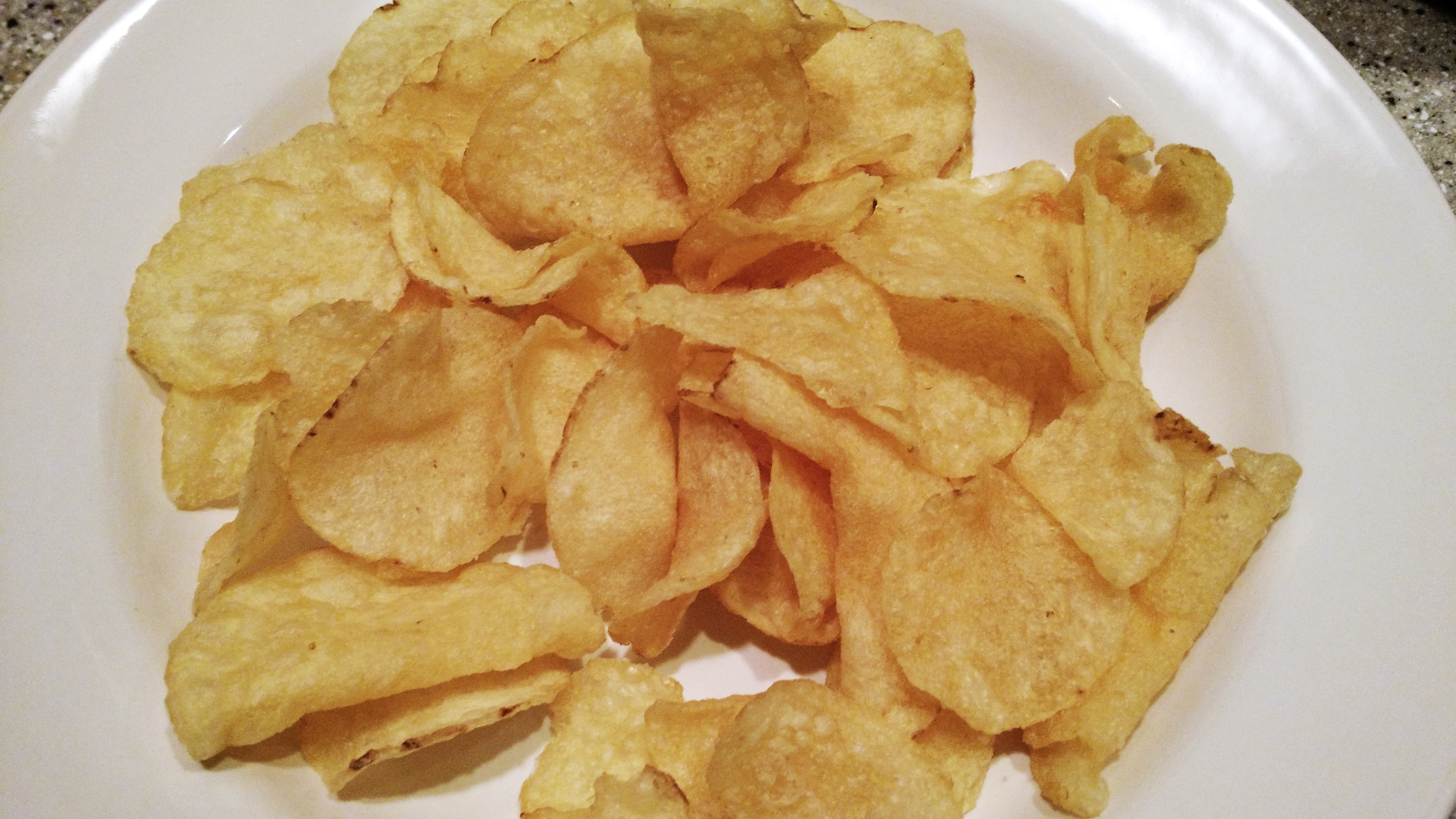
Cape Cod brand potato chips (40% reduced fat variety), January 2016

Phoebe Buffay-Hannigan (Lisa Kudrow), a fictional character on the popular US television sitcom Friends (1994–2004), is seen eating a bag of Cape Cod Chips' white cheddar popcorn in 1999 on Episode 21, Season Six ("The One Where Ross Meets Elizabeth's Dad"). Joey Tribbiani (played by Matt Le Blanc), from the same US sitcom, is also seen eating Cape Cod chips in Episode 13 of Season 7 ("The One Where Rosita Dies").

Japanese jazz pianist Hiromi Uehara recorded a composition titled "Cape Cod Chips" on her 2009 solo piano album Place to Be.

In the spring of 2012, Cape Cod Potato Chips launched a television commercial starring a band of computer-generated seagulls performing A Flock of Seagulls' 1982 hit "I Ran (So Far Away)". This was the first commercial made for television by the company.

On the Lil Wayne mixtape Sorry 4 the wait 2 in the song "No Haters"_{,} Cape Cod Chips are referenced in the lyrics "Pockets lookin' like the Blob, chips like Cape Cod".

On the Arthur episode "The Chips Are Down", the "A Word From Us Kids" segment featured a tour of the Cape Code Potato Chips factory.

== See also ==
- List of popcorn brands

== Sources ==
- Severson, Kim (2007-07-04). "The Best Chip? The First One Out of the Bag". The New York Times. ISSN 0362-4331.
- "Savoring 35 years of Local Flavor- Cape Cod Potato Chips". Cape Cod LIFE. 2015-07-01.
- Lance inc Announces Agreement with Cape Cod Potato Chips
- "Savoring 35 years of Local Flavor- Cape Cod Potato Chips". Cape Cod LIFE. 2015-07-01.
- GOLD, ROBERT. "New flock in town for CC Potato Chips". capecodtimes.com.
- Gorman, John (3 September 1986). "POTATO CHIP FIRM THRIVING AFTER SURVIVING A BIG DIP". chicagotribune.com.
- How Potato Chips Stack UpSK (2019-03-31). "Cape Cod White Cheddar Popcorn Held by Lisa Kudrow (Phoebe Buffay) in Friends Season 6 Episode 21 "The One Where Ross Meets Elizabeth's Dad" (2000) TV Show". Product Placement Blog.
- SHEMKUS, SARAH. "Cape Cod Potato Chips founder dies". capecodtimes.com.
