= Archway Cookies =

American cookie manufacturer

Archway Bakeries
- Type: Subsidiary
- Industry: Food
- Founded: 1936; 90 years ago
- Founder: Harold and Ruth Swanson
- Headquarters: Charlotte, North Carolina, U.S.
- Products: Cookies
- Parent: Snyder's of Hanover (Snyder's-Lance)

Archway Cookies is an American cookie manufacturer, founded in 1936 in Battle Creek, Michigan. Since December 2008, it has been a subsidiary of Lance Inc., a snack food company, which in turn merged with Snyder's of Hanover to form Snyder's-Lance. Archway is best known for its variations of oatmeal cookies.

== History ==
=== Swanson Home Style Cookies ===
In 1936, Harold and Ruth Swanson began baking soft oatmeal cookies and doughnuts in their home's garage in Battle Creek. By the late 1940s, they had discontinued baking doughnuts to focus on cookies. They had 15 different varieties of cookies by 1949. In the 1950s they licensed their cookie recipes and began selling baking franchises in Indiana, Wisconsin, and Canada.

=== Change of name to Archway Cookies and expansion ===
The Swansons changed their company name in 1954 to avoid trademark confusion with C.A. Swanson and Sons, which had just begun the national roll-out of their frozen meal line. Archway was chosen for the company's new name, taking its name from the arch motif featured as a part of the original Swanson cookie packaging. The company's licensing agreements continued to grow, with 33 bakeries packaging and marketing Archway cookies, usually within their own states.

Archway's flagship varieties were Oatmeal, Date-Filled Oatmeal, Frosty Lemon, Molasses and Pecan Ice Box, with Oatmeal varieties accounting for 30 percent of product sales. The company emphasized its homemade and fresh approach to baking cookies, and often used the term 'Archway Homestyle Cookies'. Most varieties were packaged in two stacks of six large cookies and wrapped in clear cellophane with a freshness code printed on the front label. Multiple varieties, such as Ruth's Golden Oatmeal, were 'state fair winning' recipes, selected from entries to company-sponsored baking competitions. Archway's product line quickly expanded to several dozen varieties, including Peanut Jumble, Rocky Road, Mississippi Mud Cake, Fudge Nut Bar, German Chocolate, Black Walnut Ice Box, Date Nut Bar, Iced Spice, New Orleans Cake, Pineapple Filled, Sour Cream, Soft Sugar, and Cookie Jar Hermit.

=== Development of the National Brand ===
In 1962, Archway was sold to bakery employee (and Swanson son-in-law) George Markham, who bought back several of the franchises over the next two years, rolling the production into two corporate cookie-manufacturing plants in Ohio and Iowa. This marked the beginning of the development of Archway Cookies as a cohesive national brand as well as a period of rapid growth for the company.

In 1983, Markham sold Archway Cookies, Incorporated to Thomas F. Olin (vice president of Ohio bakery operations) and Eugene McKay (vice president of corporate office), with Olin taking the position of chairman of the board and McKay named as president. Going forward, one of the primary goals of the parent company (Archway Cookies, Inc.) was to establish a more consistent national brand, in order to meet the merchandising, pricing, and promotional requirements of newly emerging national retail grocery chains. This was achieved in part by gaining tighter control of product and pricing. Cooperative marketing agreements were made with a handful of franchises while others were purchased and rolled into the national corporate structure. These changes enabled Archway to participate in national retail promotions and gain stronger shelf position with emerging super-store grocery operators, such as Walmart and Target. In addition, Archway Cookies, Inc. began to implement national marketing positioning strategies with the development of television, radio, and print campaigns such as 'Big Cookie Time', 'The Good Food Cookie', and 'Cookies For Kids' (charity fund-raiser for Children's Miracle Network hospitals).

Another factor in Archway's accelerated sales growth was the popularity of the Archway Holiday Cookie line, which eventually expanded to more than 23 varieties, including Nutty Nougat, Pfeffernüsse, Almond Crescents, Coconut Macaroons, Wedding Cake, and Bells, Trees and Stars. By the late 1980s, Archway had become the largest manufacturer of holiday cookies in the world. Retail stores would often feature promotional Archway 'Cookie House' displays, built with hundreds or thousands of packages of holiday cookies. By the early 1990s, holiday cookies represented more than ten percent of total brand cookie sales.

=== Product Developments—'The Good Food Cookie' ===
Throughout the late 1980s and early 1990s, Archway began to take advantage of the 'healthful' nature of their cookies, focusing on natural ingredients, no preservatives, and no saturated fat. A strategic key to this was that Archway delivered its product using DSD (Direct Store Delivery) distributors, and was able to manage the product on the shelf more effectively than warehoused cookies. Most Archway varieties had a shelf life of six to eight weeks, enabling the cookies to stay soft and fresh. Archway Cookies, Inc developed a marketing theme, trademarking the phrase 'The Good Food Cookie' to exploit these competitive advantages with consumers and the retail trade. Commensurate with the development of low and non-fat ingredient technologies, Archway introduced a successful 'fat-free' line of cookies and gingersnaps. As a result, Archway Cookies had become a favorite of health-conscious cookie-eaters across the country, driving low-fat and fat-free sales increases of more than 170 percent in 1994.

The company achieved annual unit and dollar sales increases every year between 1990 and 1998, and the brand doubled national retail market share; it expanded from three percent to six percent (IRI and Neilsen), establishing Archway as the third-largest retail cookie brand in the United States. The company also maintained its position as the number one oatmeal and holiday cookie brand in the United States; number two in fat free, fruit filled and gingersnap share, ranking behind Nabisco and Keebler. By the late 1990s, Archway brand sales were exceeding 125,000,000 packages per year.

=== Changes in ownership—Specialty Foods Corporation / Parmalat / Catterton Partners ===
On October 30, 1996, Archway Chairman Thomas Olin died suddenly, eventually precipitating the sale of Archway Cookies, Incorporated in 1998 to Specialty Foods Corporation. SFC was concentrating on their baking business and bought Archway Cookies along with San Diego Bread Company for more than US$100+ million. This purchase by SFC occurred in conjunction with its purchase of the Mother's Cookies brand and continued an ongoing trend of consolidation within the industry.

In 2000, Specialty sold the Mother's and Archway brands to Parmalat Finanziaria, a division of Parmalat, for a reported US$250 million. In 2005, Parmalat (plagued by scandals and bankruptcy unrelated to Archway) sold—for an undisclosed amount—what was by then called Archway & Mother's Cookie Co. to Catterton Partners, a private-equity firm specializing in leveraged buyouts, recapitalizations and growth capital investments in middle-market companies. Catterton, in turn, hired Insight Holdings to manage the company, but three Catterton executives were appointed to Archway's board of directors. Former Archway employees claim that Insight largely managed the company through telephone and videoconference calls. Archway had a bank line of credit from Wachovia, a financial-services company, that was dependent on certain financial targets being met. In order to meet these targets and to obtain cash from Wachovia, Archway engaged in an alleged fraud. Specifically, it allegedly began to report bogus sales numbers by booking "virtual sales" which were, in fact, non-existent. Throughout the year (2005) cookie sales began to drop with sales falling to US$152 million. Archway's outside auditors, Ernst & Young, threatened to issue a going-concern qualification on Archway's financial statements.

A series of lawsuits have since been filed against Catterton, Insight Holdings, Archway, and various executives and former executives of each of these companies. In one of the lawsuits, Catterton is accused by a group of creditors that the alleged accounting fraud continued for as long as it did because of the "control, participation and acquiescence" of Catterton.

=== Lance buys the Archway brand ===
In December 2008, Lance won the bankruptcy auction for Archway Cookies. Lance reopened the plant in Ashland, Ohio, and Archway again began producing cookies. Following its acquisition of Archway, Lance trimmed Archway's product line from nearly 100 to 21. Archway still manufactures its popular varieties of oatmeal cookies and several of the popular products exclusive to Mother's Cookies prior to their merger, including frosted Animal crackers.
