= Stella D'oro =

Commercial baking company

Stella D'oro Biscuit Co.

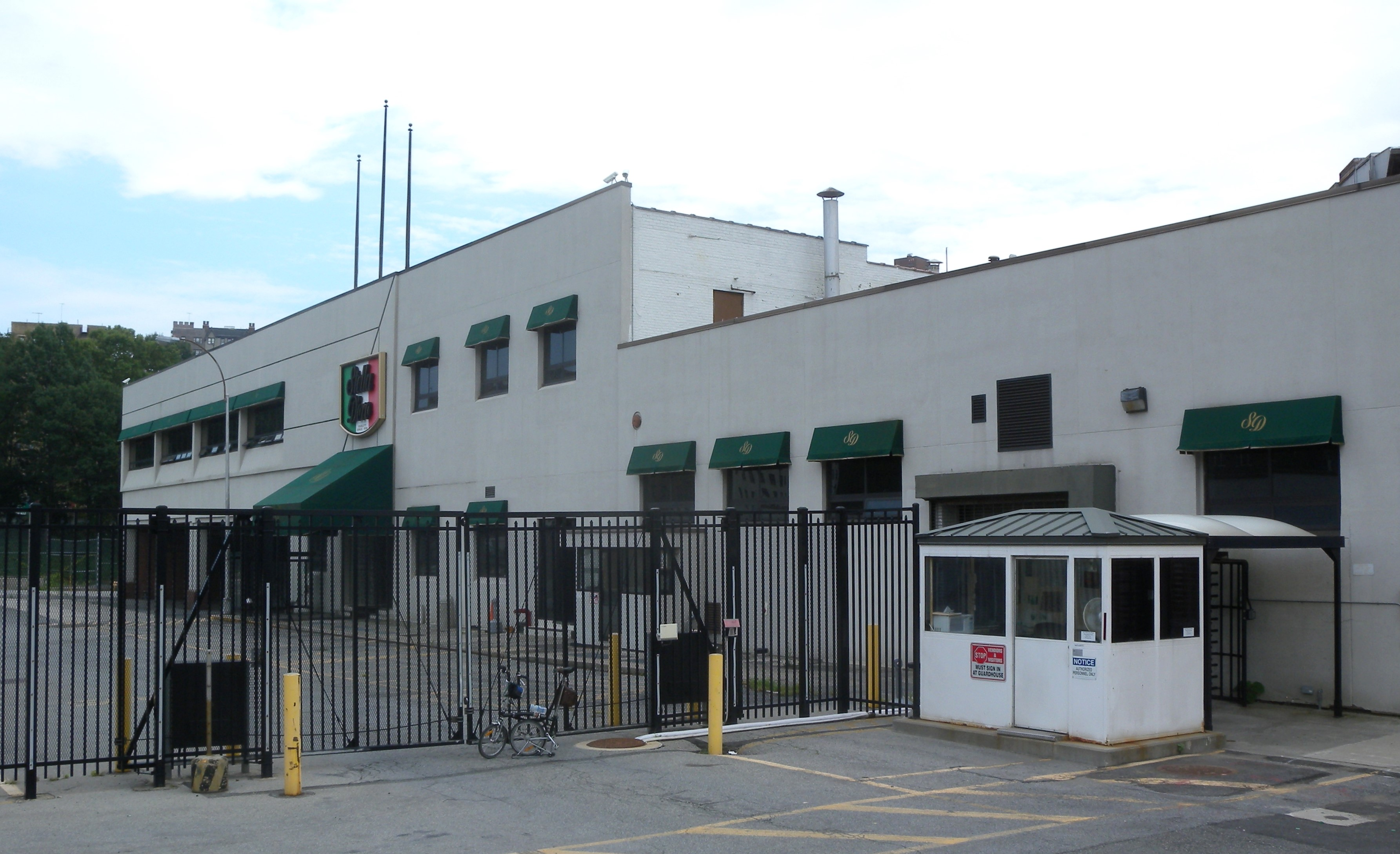
- Former factory in the Bronx in August 2010
- Formerly: Stella D'oro Biscuit Company
- Type: Private (1919–92)
- Industry: Food
- Founded: 1919
- Founder: Joseph Kresevich
- Defunct: 2009; 17 years ago
- Fate: Company closed, brand sold to Lance in 2009
- Headquarters: Kingsbridge, Bronx, U.S.
- Products: Cookies, breadsticks, biscottis
- Parent: Nabisco (1992–2006); Brynwood Partners (2006–09)

Stella D'oro is an American brand of cookies and breadsticks owned by Snyder's-Lance. Stella D'oro means "star of gold" in Italian, and the cookies are inspired by Italian baking. Its products include breadsticks, Swiss Fudge and other cookies, biscotti, and their S-shaped breakfast treats.

The original Stella D'oro company was established in 1930 by Italian immigrants Angela and Joseph Kresevich as "Stella D'oro Biscuit Company". The family also operated a restaurant next door to its manufacturing facility on West 237th Street at the north end of Kingsbridge in the Bronx, New York City. In 1992 the family sold the business for $10 million to Nabisco, which became part of Kraft Foods in 2000. In 2006, Kraft sold Stella D'oro to the private equity firm Brynwood Partners for $17.5 million. Brynwood in turn sold the company to Lance in 2009 for $23.9 million.

== History ==
Joseph, an immigrant from Trieste, Italy, began working in New York City bakeries after his arrival in the U.S. in 1922, and developed his own recipes. He married his wife, Angela, "an expert baker in her own right" in 1928. The two later founded the Stella D'Oro bakery, which evolved into the Stella D'oro Biscuit Company. The biscuits produced were less sweet than other Italian baked goods and marketed as an accompaniment to coffee and tea. Early on they made their cookies "pareve" (with neither meat nor dairy products), which appealed to a large and loyal New York kosher market. This early success led the company to relocate to a building at 237th and Broadway, in the Kingsbridge section of the Bronx. Felice L. (Phil) Zambetti later became the company's CEO.

=== Buyout, strike and closing ===
In 2006, Brynwood Partners bought the Stella D'oro Biscuit Co. from Kraft Foods Inc. (now Mondelēz International) . On August 14, 2008, two weeks after their contract expired, 138 workers of the Bakery, Confectionery, Tobacco Workers and Grain Millers International Union, Local 50, went on strike citing proposed pay and benefit cuts, and later picketed the company's attempt to bring in replacement workers.

After more than 11 months of striking by its workers, the company was ordered by the National Labor Relations Board to reinstate the workers, give them back pay, and restart collective bargaining. That same month, the company announced it would close its facility. In September 2009, Brynwood announced the sale of Stella D'oro to Lance, a large manufacturer of snack foods, which intended to relocate Stella D'Oro's production to a non-union facility in Ashland, Ohio.

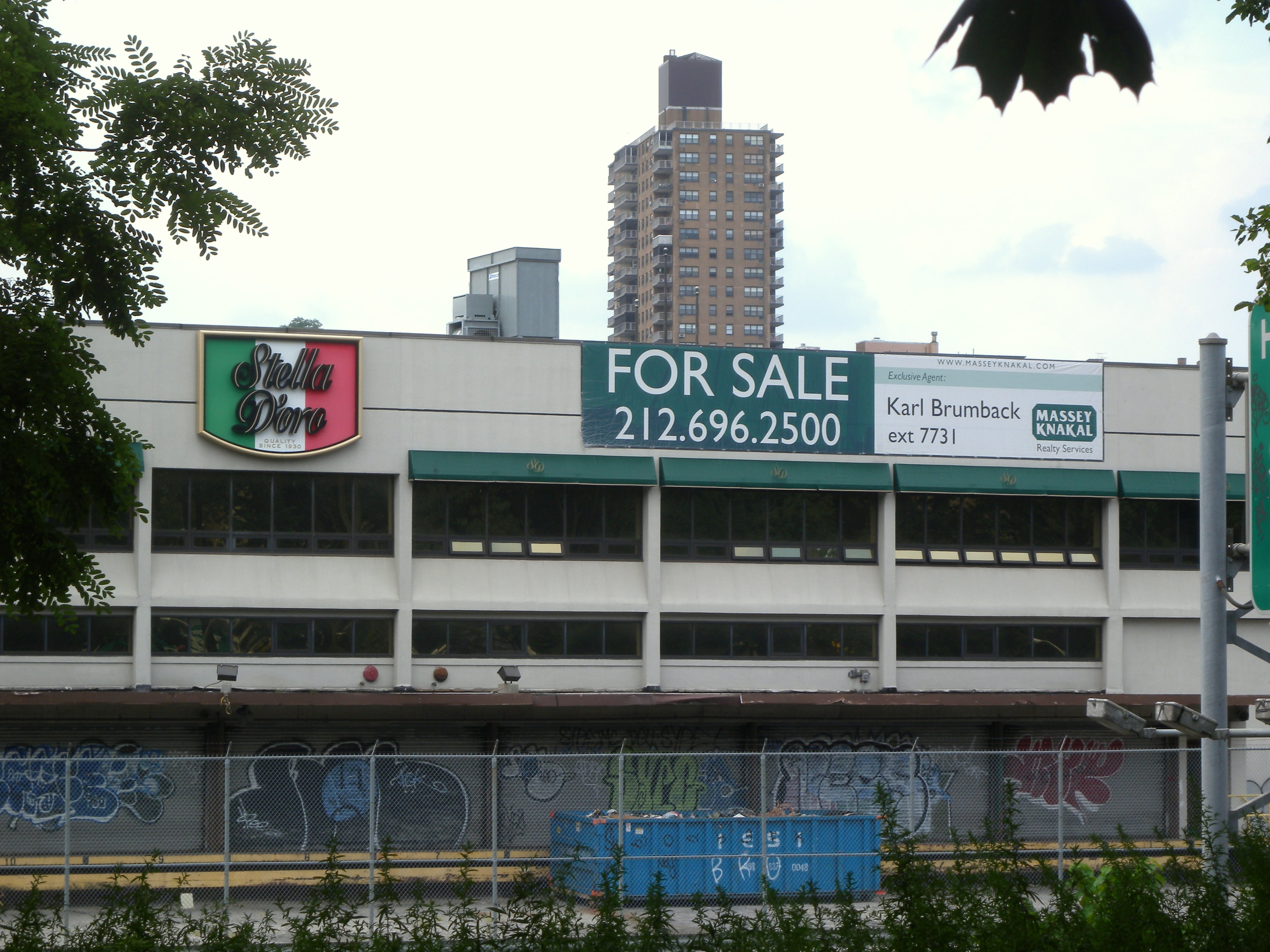
The bakery in Bronx for sale pictured in August 2010

Brynwood earned negative attention for its role in the work stoppage and sale of Stella D'oro, including a reference in an op-ed piece by the AFL–CIO's Richard Trumka, published in The Wall Street Journal in April 2010.

On September 8, 2009, Lance announced it was purchasing the Stella D'oro brand as well as certain manufacturing equipment and inventory. It thereafter began manufacturing Stella D'oro products in Lance's Ashland, Ohio, bakery. The Bronx manufacturing location, which was not included in the sale, closed after the sale, and was demolished in spring 2012.

In early September 2010, a 2 to 1 ruling by the National Labor Relations Board affirmed the June 2009 decision of an administrative law judge that Stella D'oro violated federal labor law by refusing to furnish detailed financial statements to the workers' union to support claims of needing contract concessions to survive. The board ordered the company to furnish back pay with interest, as well as benefits for the two-month period after employees offered to return to work in May 2009, and before the company took them back in July. On March 28, 2013, the Second Circuit Court of Appeals reversed the NLRB's decision, finding that Stella D'oro had not violated any federal labor law.

== Operations ==
Stella D'oro's bakery was located on West 237th Street at the north end of Kingsbridge in the Bronx, New York City, but this was closed in October 2009 after disputes with labor unions and not included in the sale to Lance. By late December 2006, the company had moved part of its manufacturing and cookie production to New Jersey.

The company's Swiss fudge cookies being made without milk or butter, Stella D'oro has a devoted following among Orthodox Jews who follow Jewish dietary guidelines. The cookies are nicknamed shtreimels, the Yiddish term for round fur hats worn on the Sabbath by some Hasidic Jews, and are pareve, a category of kosher food that contains neither meat nor dairy ingredients.

After buying the company, Kraft removed the pareve designation from Stella D'oro's baked products, but returned it after declining sales and complaints.
