= Snyder's-Lance =

American snack manufacturer

Snyder's-Lance, Inc.
- Type: Subsidiary
- Industry: Food
- Predecessor: Lance Inc. Snyder's of Hanover
- Founded: December 6, 2010; 15 years ago
- Headquarters: Charlotte, North Carolina, U.S.
- Key people: James Johnston (chairman); Jen Weaver (CEO)
- Products: Snack food
- Brands: Archway; Cape Cod; Captain's Wafers; Jays; Kettle Foods; Lance; Snyder's of Hanover; Stella D'oro; Tom's
- Parent: The Campbell's Company

Snyder's-Lance, Inc. is the second largest salty snack maker in the United States. It was formed by the 2010 merger of Lance Inc. and Snyder's of Hanover.

In 2018, the company became a subsidiary of The Campbell's Company.

== History ==
On September 6, 2012, Snyder's-Lance agreed to acquire Snack Factory for $312 million. Snyder's-Lance expected the acquisition to close early fourth quarter. On August 30, 2013, Snyder's-Lance acquired Stateline Service Corp. and no purchase price was disclosed.

In 2016, Snyder's-Lance acquired Diamond Foods in a cash and stock merger transaction bringing Kettle Foods, Diamond of California, Pop Secret and other snack brands under the Snyder's-Lance umbrella. On December 18, 2017, the company announced it had entered to an agreement to accept Campbell Soup Company's offer to purchase the company. At time of the announcement, the purchase was valued at $4.9 billion.

On January 18, 2023, Campbell Soup Company announced that the Campbell Snacks offices in Charlotte, North Carolina, and Norwalk, Connecticut, would be shut down with operations being consolidated at the company's headquarters in Camden, New Jersey.
