= Thomas F. Olin =

American businessman (1928–1996)

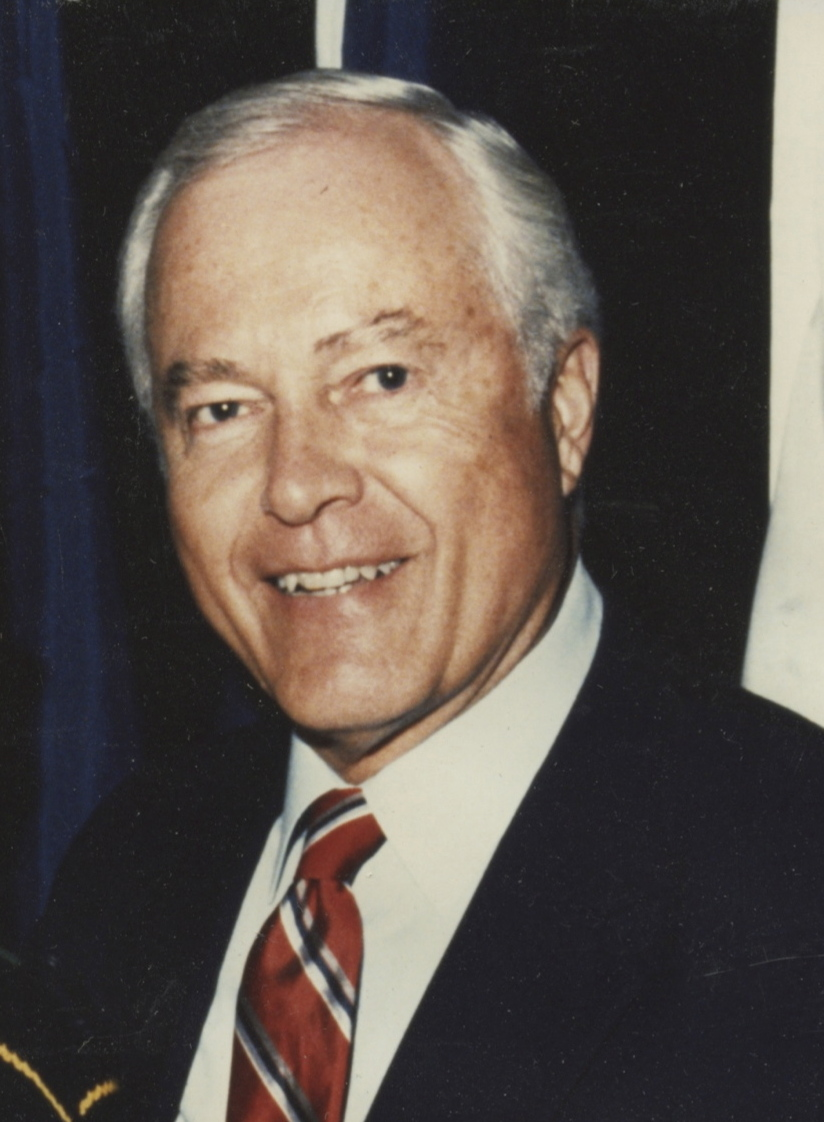
- Born: April 24, 1928; Minneapolis, Minnesota, U.S.
- Died: October 30, 1996 (aged 68); Kalamazoo, Michigan, U.S.
- Education: University of Michigan; B.A. Economics (1952); Distinguished Military Graduate
- Occupations: Executive; Builder/Architect; Foreign Relations Consultant; Government Intelligence
- Employer(s): Archway Cookies, Incorporated, Skidmore Construction Company, Central Intelligence Agency
- Title: Chairman and Co-Chief Executive Officer
- Children: include Thomas F. Olin, Jr., also formerly of Archway Cookies

Signature
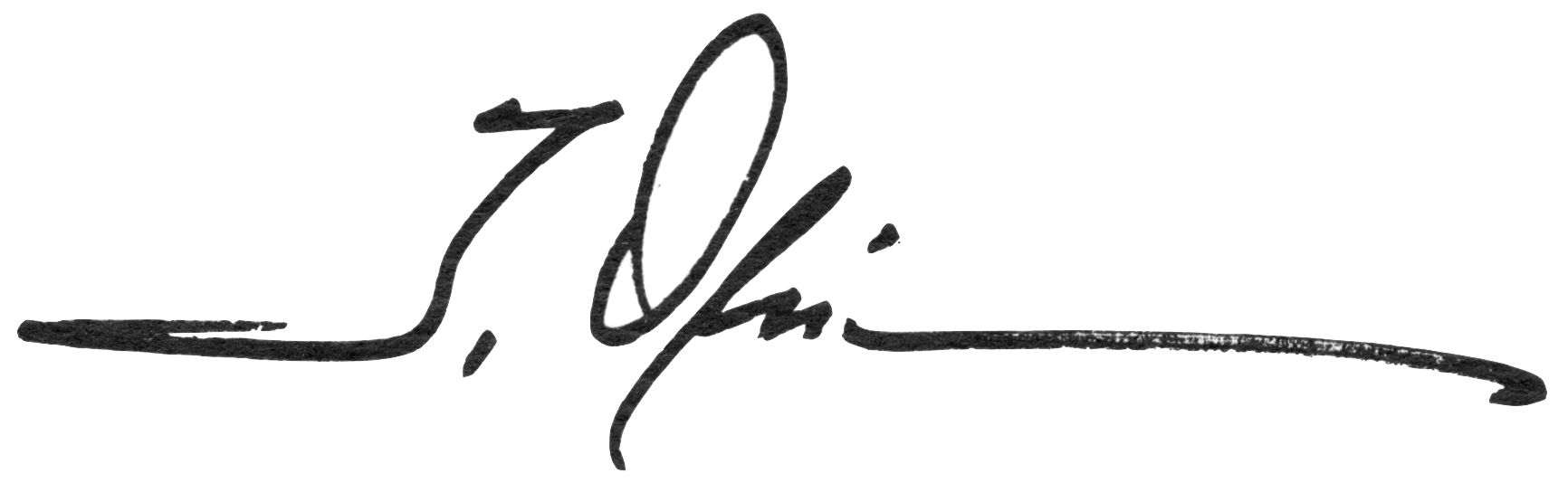

Thomas F. Olin (April 24, 1928 – October 30, 1996) was the chairman of Archway Cookies, Incorporated.

== Early life, military, and government service ==
Olin was born in Minneapolis, Minnesota, to Merton and Ann (Roring) Olin, where his father was an executive with the J. C. Penney Company. He attended seven different grade schools, and graduated from high school with honors in Grove City, Pennsylvania, in 1946. He joined the United States Army in 1946 and served two years in the military police in Japan, where one of his primary assignments was protection of the area surrounding General Douglas MacArthur's command headquarters (Dai-Ichi Building) in downtown Tokyo. After being honorably discharged, Olin attended the University of Michigan, earning a Bachelor of Arts degree in economics (distinguished military graduate), with minors in political science and speech. At the suggestion of a professor, Olin joined the Central Intelligence Agency in Washington, D.C., where he worked in clandestine operations in 1952 and 1953. He maintained relationships with the government throughout the 1960s, including serving as a consultant in American foreign relations for several years, before retiring as a major in the United States Army's Transportation Corps (USAR-TC) in 1969.

== Archway Cookies ==
In 1964, Olin joined the Archway Cookie Company as bakery general manager in Ashland, Ohio. Putting an emphasis on product freshness and quality, he expanded the bakery – originally a converted Tucker car dealership – into the largest Archway facility in the nation, producing nearly ten million cookies per week.

Olin purchased the company as a partner in 1983, and took the role of chairman of the board and co-chief executive officer; he served in that capacity until his death in 1996. By that time, Archway Cookies had become the third-largest cookie brand in the United States, with retail sales reaching a third of a billion dollars annually.

== Community service ==
While living in Ashland, Olin served on the board and as president of the Ashland Public Library (1970–1977), chairman of the Ashland City School District "Task Force" Survey (1971), vice president of the Ashland Chamber of Commerce (1970–1972), director of the Huntington National Bank (1972–1983), chairman of the Ashland County Heart Fund (1973–1975), and on Ashland University board of trustees and President's Advisory Council (1972–1996). He was a participant in the Ashland Manufacturer's Council, a member of the City of Ashland Area Traffic Improvement Committee, and a board member of the First Presbyterian Church (1970–1972). He was also member of the Ashland Rotary Club (1966–1983), Young Men's Business Club, and University Club.

As a resident of Battle Creek, Michigan, Olin served on the Battle Creek Community Foundation board of trustees (Grant Review Committee) and as a board member of the Michigan National Bank (1983–1996). In addition, he volunteered on behalf of Junior Achievement of Southwest Michigan, the South-Central Michigan Food Bank, the American Cancer Society, Big Brothers Big Sisters, Children's Miracle Network, the University of Michigan, and Habitat for Humanity. He was a lifelong Master Mason-Scottish Rite (Lodge #419), and Shriner (Saladin Temple).

== Awards and honors ==
Olin was named Ashland, Ohio's first "Citizen of the Year" in 1991, and received the Sigma Chi "Significant Sig Medal" at the fraternity international grand chapter meeting in 1993. He served as Honorary National Chairman for Junior Achievement in 1996. In 1988, Olin was the keynote speaker at the Ashland Chamber of Commerce Industrial Appreciation Dinner, where he was recognized for his contributions on behalf of the city of Ashland. In 1986, he received an honorary membership in the Delta Mu Delta honor society in Business Administration at Ashland University.

A Junior Achievement of Southwest Michigan matching-funds endowment (the Thomas F. and Gloria J. Olin Fund), managed by the Battle Creek Community Foundation, was also established in 1999. A Habitat for Humanity home, located at 10 Rose Street in Battle Creek, Michigan, was dedicated in Olin's name on January 24, 1999.
