= Jays Foods =

American snack product manufacturer

Jays Foods, Inc.
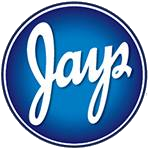
- Type: Subsidiary
- Industry: Snack food
- Founded: 1927; 99 years ago
- Founder: Leonard Japp, Sr & William Ruwitch
- Headquarters: Chicago, Illinois, U.S.
- Key people: Joe Shankland (president and CEO); Bill Luegers (CFO)
- Products: See products section
- Revenue: US$78.1 million
- Parent: Snyder's of Hanover

Jays Foods, Inc. is an American manufacturer of snack products including potato chips, popcorn and pretzels. Jays Foods was founded in 1927 in Chicago, Illinois, and is currently a subsidiary of Snyder's-Lance, Inc. Snyder's-Lance, Inc. became a subsidiary of The Campbell's Company on March 26, 2018. Operating in several Midwestern states, Jays Foods' potato chips and popcorn maintain significant shares of their respective markets.

== History ==
Leonard Japp Sr. began selling pretzels from a truck in 1927. The business grew to feature a potato chip recipe made by Japp's wife, Eugenia. After the Wall Street crash of 1929, Japp found a new business partner (George Johnson of Chicago, later Founder of Chesty's in Terre Haute, IN) and began selling the chips under the brand name "Mrs. Japp’s Potato Chips". The 1941 attack on Pearl Harbor and subsequent anti-Japanese sentiment in the United States, however, led to a negative connotation towards the word "Jap" in the United States. The chips were consequently rebranded to "Jays Potato Chips" to avoid the sound-alike name, and the company became Jays Foods, Inc.

Jays Foods remained a family-owned company until 1986, when the company was sold to Borden, Inc. In 1994, Jays Foods was re-acquired by the Japp Family. In 2004, Jays Foods was purchased by Willis Stein & Partners, a Chicago private-equity firm, and, together with another snack company acquired by Willis Stein & Partners, Lincoln Snacks Company, assigned a parent company, Ubiquity Brands.

Jays Foods filed for Chapter 11 bankruptcy on October 11, 2007, the second time in four years, and permanently closed its Chicago manufacturing plant on December 5, 2007. On December 5, 2007, the remaining assets of Jay's were acquired by Snyder's-Lance, Inc. who have said they will continue to manufacture and distribute Jays products throughout the Midwest. Snyder's-Lance will continue to operate Jays Chicago warehouse and distribution center and its Jeffersonville, Indiana, manufacturing facility.

== Operations ==
Jays Foods manufactures, markets and distributes its products in the seven state area of Illinois, Indiana, Michigan, Wisconsin, Iowa, Minnesota and Missouri. Jays Foods has distribution centers in fifteen major cities in the seven state marketing area. Jays has 310 company-owned routes, and 200 routes owned by independent distributors. The company has a total of 943 employees.

=== Market share ===
Jays Foods does not market its products nationally. Despite competition from national brands such as Frito-Lay, which has a 67 percent market share, Jays Foods has 23 percent share of the potato chip market in Illinois, Indiana, Wisconsin, Missouri, Minnesota and Iowa and over 60 percent market share in the "ready-to-eat" popcorn category. Jays foods had considered the possibility of competing as a national brand and conducted marketing research and held focus groups in New Jersey and California in 2007.

== Products ==
Jays (potato chips)

- Jays Crispy Ridged Potato Chips – Original; Ranch Herb; Onion & Garlic; Barbecue, Smoky BBQ, Cheddar & Sour Cream.
- Jays E-Z Dippin's (discontinued) – Mini pretzels & mustard; Tortilla chips & nacho cheese dip; Tortilla chips & salsa
- Jays Potato Chips – Original; Barbecue; Cheese; Salt 'n Sour; Sour 'n Dill; Hot Stuff, Jay's bacon & cheddar

Krunchers! (kettle and corn chips)

- Krunchers! Potato Chips – Original; Reduced Fat; Cheddar & Sour Cream; Jalapeño; Sea Salt & Cracked Pepper; Mesquite Bar-B-Que; Hawaiian Sweet Onion; Hot Buffalo Wing; Kosher Dill
- Krunchers! Sweet Baby Jays (discontinued) – Chips made from sweet potatoes; introduced summer 2006
- Krunchers! Corn chips – Spicy Four Cheese; Guacamole; Jalapeño

O-Ke-Doke (popcorn)

- O-Ke-Doke Balls of Fire
- O-Ke-Doke Hot Cheese Flavored Popcorn
- O-Ke-Doke Cheese Popcorn
- O-Ke-Doke Chicago Mix Popcorn (Cheese and Caramel Corn)
- O-Ke-Doke White Cheddar Popcorn

Hot Stuff (other snacks)

- Hot Stuff Crunchy Cheezlets

== See also ==
- Frito-Lay
- Old Dutch Foods
