= Abraham Anderson =

American businessman (1832–1915)

- Born: 1832; United States
- Died: June 10, 1915 (aged 82–83); Haddonfield, New Jersey, U.S.
- Occupation: Businessman
- Years active: 1860–1915
- Known for: Founder of the Anderson Preserving Company

Abraham Anderson (1832 – June 10, 1915) was an American businessman, the founder of the Anderson Preserving Company in 1860. In 1869 he partnered with Joseph A. Campbell and their company became Campbell's Soup in 1920.

== Biography ==
He was born in 1832.

He worked as an icebox manufacturer, and in 1860 founded the Anderson Preserving Company. In 1869 he teamed up with Joseph A. Campbell. In 1876 he left the company.

In 1891, he was an organizer of the Central Trust Company in Camden, New Jersey.

He died on June 10, 1915, at his home in Haddonfield, New Jersey.
