= Willis Stein & Partners =

Private equity firm

- Type: Private Ownership
- Industry: Private Equity
- Founded: 1995; 31 years ago
- Founder: John Willis, Avy Stein
- Headquarters: Chicago, Illinois, United States
- Products: Private equity funds, Leveraged buyouts
- Total assets: $3.0 billion
- Website: www.willisstein.com

Willis Stein & Partners was a private equity firm focused on leveraged buyout transactions for middle-market companies. The firm was wound down in 2012.

The firm's most notable investments included Ziff Davis, Roundy's, Jays Foods, Lincoln Snacks Company and Petersen Publishing Company (publisher of Motor Trend).

The firm was headquartered in Chicago and was founded in 1995.

== History ==
Prior to founding the firm John Willis and Avy Stein were executives of Continental Illinois Venture Corp. (CIVC), the private equity arm of Continental Illinois National Bank and Trust Company. When Continental Illinois was acquired in 1994 by Bank of America, John Willis and Avy Stein, who had run the group at Continental Illinois left to form Willis Stein & Partners. They were quickly able to raise over $300 million of investor commitments.

== Investment funds ==
Since its inception in 1995, Willis Stein raised three private equity funds with nearly $3.0 billion of investor commitments. As of 2007, the firm had announced the launch of a fourth fund. Due to mixed results in its 2000 vintage fund, Willis Stein waited nearly eight years before launching a new fund and when it did so the firm significantly decreased its target fund size relative to its last fund.

- Willis Stein & Partners (1995) - $343 million
- Willis Stein & Partners II (1998) - $840 million
- Willis Stein & Partners III (2000) - $1.8 billion
- Willis Stein & Partners IV (Announced) - $1.0 billion target

Willis & Stein Partners were known for purchasing for-profit educational institutions and consolidating resources for additional profit margins. At one point they owned over 92 for-profit educational institutions, with plans to close 22 locations due to low profits.
