= Pop Secret =

American brand of popcorn

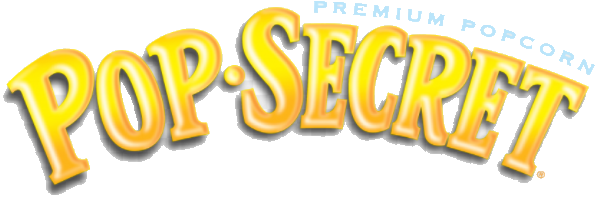
- Product type: Popcorn
- Current owner: Our Home
- Country: U.S.
- Introduced: 1985; 41 years ago
- Previous owners: General Mills (1985–2008); Diamond Foods (2008–2016); Snyder's-Lance (2016–2024)
- Website: popsecret.com

Pop Secret is an American brand of popcorn owned by Our Home. Our Home acquired the brand from the Campbell Soup Company in 2024.

Pop Secret popcorn was introduced by General Mills in 1985.

== Overview ==
The brand was first introduced in November 1985 with two varieties, butter and natural, as "Betty Crocker's Pop Secret", under the established Betty Crocker branding owned by General Mills. Early and established brands of microwave popcorn were sold in the freezer section until Orville Redenbacher released a shelf-stable product in 1983, which cost more than double a larger bag of regular freezer popcorn. Consumers desiring microwave popcorn had to look both in the freezer and snack sections for competing products. General Mills was already selling a frozen version it had developed under the Pillsbury brand, which was associated with refrigerated foods such as canned biscuits rather than shelf-stable foods. Backed by a $15 million advertising campaign, Pop Secret took the market lead by 1987 by claiming it was the first brand suitable for all microwave ovens regardless of wattage. Unpopped kernels were a problem with early brands, especially when using low wattage microwaves, and Pop Secret advertising implied that the "secret" to overcoming this issue was known to home cooking expert Betty Crocker and no one else, resulting in more popped kernels.

Pop Secret was purchased by Diamond Foods in September 2008 for about $190 million, removing access to the Betty Crocker branding. Snyder's-Lance in turn purchased the brand from Diamond in 2016, and Snyders itself was acquired by Campbell's a year later.

== Sponsorships ==
Pop Secret formerly sponsored an annual NASCAR race called the "Pop Secret Microwave Popcorn 400" at Rockingham Speedway in North Carolina, as well as the race it was replaced by in 2004, the "Pop Secret 500" at Auto Club Speedway in Fontana, California. Pop Secret created a variety of colored popcorn called Pop Qwiz [sic] in the early 1990s. Colors included yellow, blue, green, and a mystery bag with a surprise color. Pop Secret created the What's Your Pop Secret? Theatre, which showcased and supported independent film makers. Pop Secret continues to support Film Independent (FIND), a non-profit organization that helps increase diversity in film making within the industry.

In 2014, Pop Secret introduced a pre-popped popcorn in a bag.

On September 15, 2015, it was announced that Pop Secret would become the official popcorn of the Disneyland Resort and the Walt Disney World Resort, as well as becoming the title sponsor of the nighttime show Fantasmic! at Disney's Hollywood Studios at Walt Disney World.

== See also ==
- List of popcorn brands
