= Snyder's of Hanover =

American pretzel company

Snyder's of Hanover, Inc.
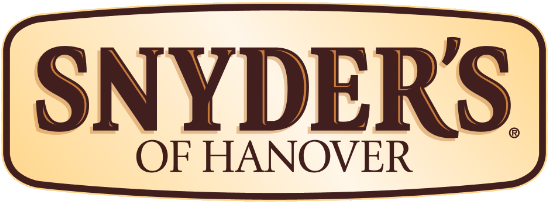
- Type: Subsidiary
- Industry: Pretzels
- Founded: 1909; 117 years ago
- Founder: Harry V. Warehime
- Headquarters: Hanover, Pennsylvania, U.S.
- Key people: Michael Warehime (chairman); Carl Lee (president, CEO)
- Products: See products section
- Revenue: US$652 million
- Parent: Campbell Soup Company
- Subsidiaries: Jays Foods
- Website: www.snydersofhanover.com

Snyder's of Hanover, Inc. is an American bakery and pretzel brand distribution company based in Hanover, Pennsylvania, specializing in pretzel snacks. Its products are sold throughout the United States, Canada, many European nations, Asia, and in the Middle East.

== History ==
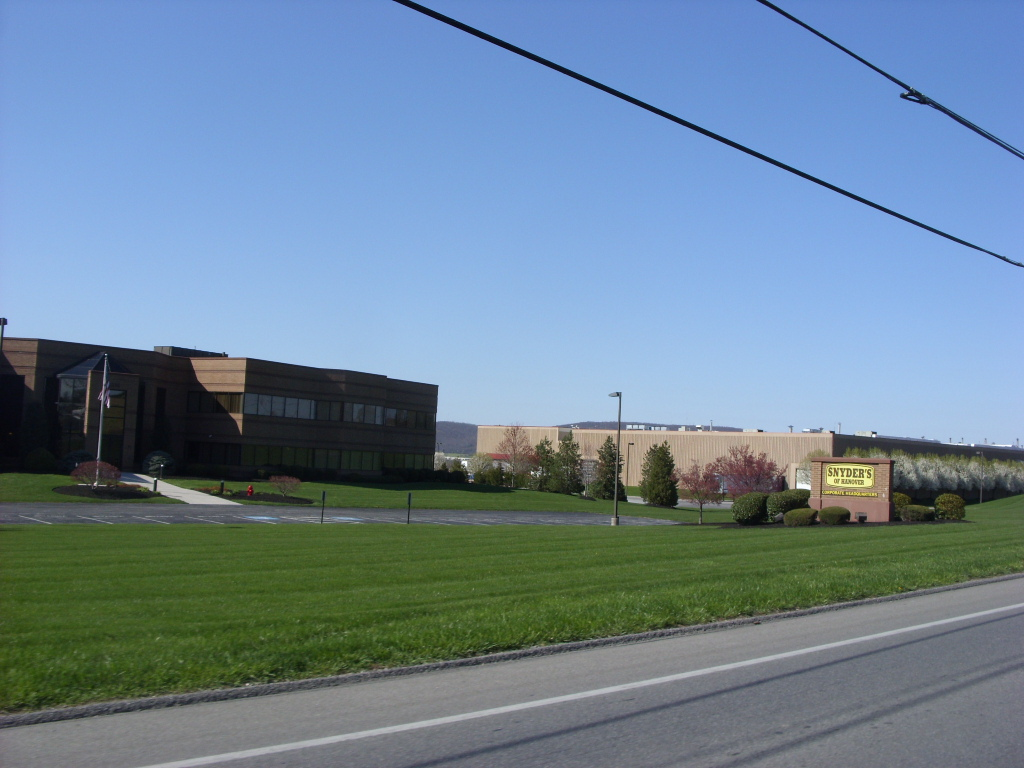
Former Snyder's of Hanover corporate headquarters in Penn Township

Snyder's of Hanover traces its roots to a bakery formed in Hanover, Pennsylvania, by Harry Warehime in 1909. In 1920 Eda and Edward Snyder started selling their homemade fried potato chips at various businesses. In 1950, the company was split into two independent companies: Snyder's of Hanover and Snyder of Berlin. The Hanover Canning Company (later called Hanover Brands, now Hanover Foods) purchased Snyder's of Hanover in 1961. Snyder's of Hanover was again spun off as an independent company in 1981. Snyder's of Hanover is no longer associated with Snyder of Berlin, something that is indicated on packages of Snyder's of Hanover.

In December 2007, Snyder's of Hanover acquired bankrupt Jays Foods of Chicago, Illinois, and planned to continue making and distributing Jays' full line of snacks throughout the midwestern United States.

In 2010, a plan to merge with rival Utz Quality Foods was blocked by the U.S. Federal Trade Commission. On July 22, 2010, it was announced that Snyder's of Hanover would be merging with Lance Inc. to create one of the largest snack food companies in the nation. The merged company became Snyder's-Lance, and is based in Charlotte, North Carolina. In December 2017, it was announced that Campbell Soup would acquire Snyder's-Lance for US$4.9 billion. Utz Foods would go on to merge with the similarly named but unaffiliated company Snyder of Berlin on October 25, 2019.

== See also ==
- List of brand name snack foods
