= Captain's Wafers =

American brand of crackers

Captain's Cracker's
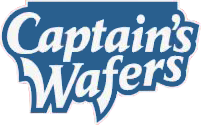
- Product type: Crackers
- Current owner: Lance Inc.
- Country: U.S.
- Website: lance.com/captainswafers

Captain's Wafers is an American brand of crackers that is made by Lance Inc. They are light buttery crackers typically served with soups and salads.

According to David Beard, the director of training at Lance, Inc., the name of the Captain's Wafers came from the idea that "on a ship, the captains always had the best of everything when it came to meals. So the name Captain's Wafers was used to show they were the very best wafers."

The name was submitted by Joe M. Logan, (executive vice president of sales and marketing at Lance, retired from Lance in 1975). Mr. Logan had returned from World War II service in the South Pacific with the US Army's 7th Infantry Division in 1946. It was his experience on board a merchant vessel going home, during which he was asked to dine at the Captain's table, that produced the idea for the crackers' name.

== Sandwich cracker varieties ==
- Cream Cheese & Chives on Captain's Wafers
- Peanut Butter with Honey on Captain's Wafers
- Grilled Cheese on Captain's Wafers
- White Cheddar on Captain's Wafers
- Captain's Choice Variety Pack
- Four Cheese on Captain's Wafers
- Jalapeño Cheddar
- BOLDS Buffalo Ranch
- BOLDS Smokehouse Cheddar
