= Diamond Foods =

American packaged food company (1912–2016)

Diamond Foods Inc.
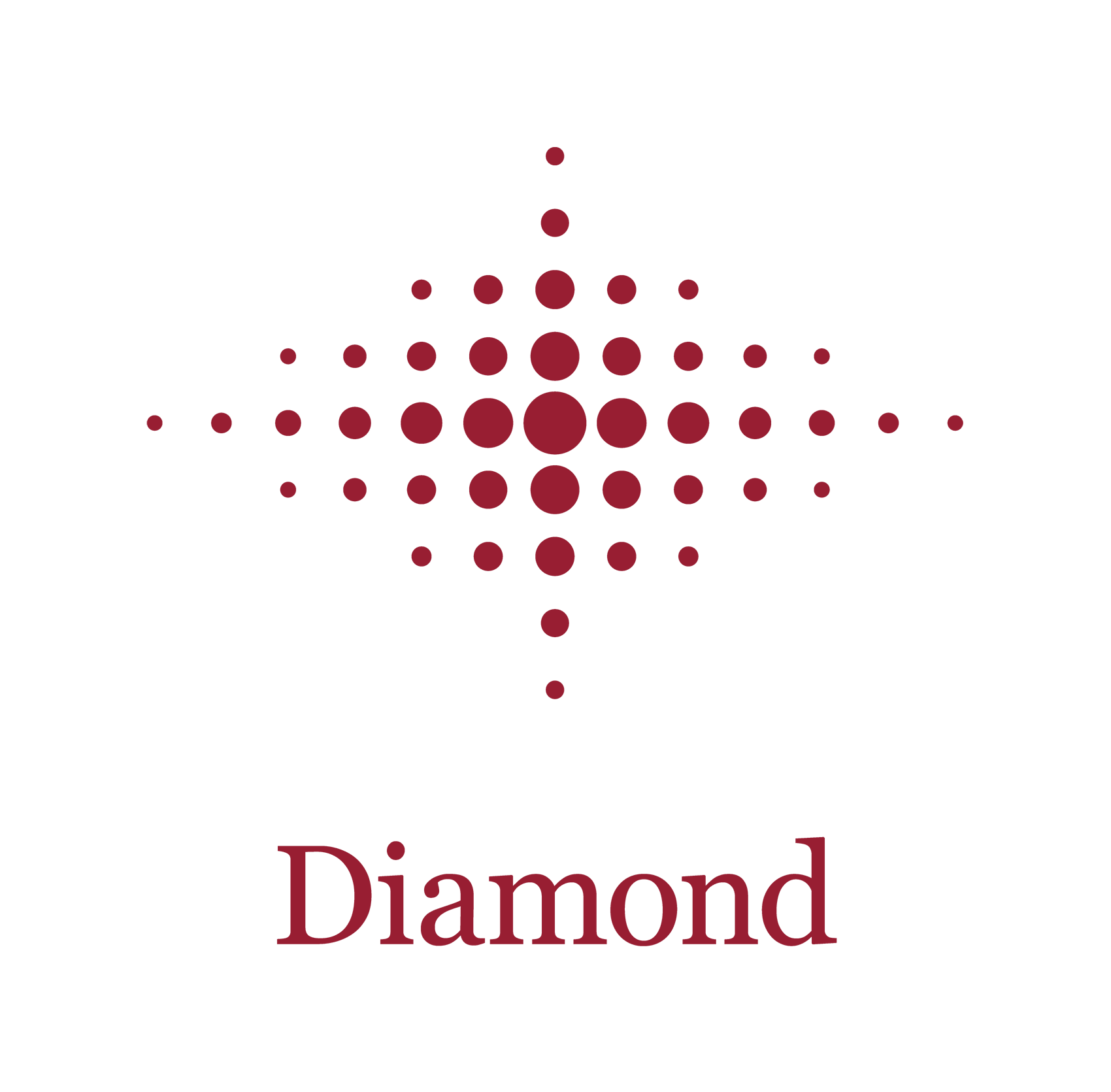
- Type: Subsidiary
- Industry: Consumer packaged goods
- Founded: 1912; 114 years ago
- Defunct: 2016
- Fate: Acquired; split up
- Headquarters: Stockton, California, U.S.
- Area served: 100+ countries
- Parent: Snyder's-Lance

Diamond Foods Inc. was an American packaged food company based in Stockton, California that marketed nuts (particularly walnuts and almonds) and other snack foods.

Diamond Foods was acquired by Snyder's-Lance in 2016, and as of 2018, owns Diamond Foods's former snack brands. Diamond Foods's nut business, Diamond of California, was split and is owned by Blue Road Capital.

== History ==
The company was founded in 1912 as Diamond Walnut Growers, Inc., a member-owned Californian agricultural cooperative association. In July 2005, Diamond Walnut Growers converted to a Delaware corporation and initial public offering of stock as Diamond Foods.

=== Timeline ===
- 1912: Diamond was founded as a cooperative by a group of Californian walnut growers.
- 1919: Diamond was the first nut producer to launch a national advertising campaign.
- 1930: Diamond started to sell its nuts abroad.
- 1950: Diamond became the first nut company to advertise on TV.
- 1956: Diamond centralized its operations to Stockton, California.
- 1989: Diamond was the first company to adopt laser sorters in its processing plant to eliminate shell fragments.
- 1997: Japan became Diamond’s number one export market for shelled walnuts.
- 1998: Diamond introduced a full line of shelled packaged nuts for baking and cooking and became the number one global marketer of in-shell nuts.
- 1999: Diamond changed its name to Diamond of California.
- 2000, 2002, and 2004: Diamond was the exclusive nut supplier to the U.S. Olympic teams.
- 2004: J Stone & Son merged with Diamond Foods.
- 2004: The Emerald Nuts line of snack nuts was launched.
- 2005: Diamond of California became Diamond Foods Inc., and became a publicly traded company (NASDAQ DMND).
- 2006: Diamond acquired Harmony Foods, including an Indiana production facility.
- 2007: Diamond’s Super Bowl spot featuring Robert Goulet ranked as the number one ad by Advertising Age and resulted in a 68 percent sales increase of Emerald.
- 2008: Diamond acquired Pop Secret popcorn from General Mills.
- 2009: Emerald hits ten percent share of the snack nut market in U.S. food stores.
- 2010: Diamond acquired Kettle Foods potato chip company with operations in the U.S. and the U.K.
- 2011: Diamond and Procter & Gamble announced that Pringles would merge with Diamond. The deal was expected to close by June 2012.
- 2012: The company is troubled by an accounting scandal and the Pringles deal is cancelled.
- 2013: Following the accounting scandal of 2012, on January 18, 2013, Diamond Foods officially ceases all production at its Fishers, Indiana plant. Over 100 full-time employees are fired and the Harmony brand is permanently discontinued.
- 2014: The SEC authorized a settlement in regards to the 2012 accounting scandal. The SEC separately entered into a settlement with the former CEO, Michael Mendes. SEC litigation with the former CFO, Steven Neil, remained unresolved.
- 2015: The SEC entered into a settlement with Steven Neil in regards to the 2012 accounting scandal.
- 2016: Snyder's-Lance acquired Diamond Foods and all companies under the Diamond Foods Name.
- 2017: Snyder's-Lance sold the Diamond of California culinary nut business to Blue Road Capital.

== Diamond Foods brands ==
Diamond Foods had five product lines:

- Diamond Foods’ line of potato chips are sold under the Kettle Brand label in the United States and Kettle Chips brand in the United Kingdom. They are available in a variety of flavors, styles and package sizes.
- Diamond Foods’ snack nuts are sold under the Emerald brand, and include trail mix, roasted, glazed and flavored snack nut products and other snacks. The product line includes 100 Calorie pack sizes.
- Diamond Foods’ popcorn, in both kernels and various flavors of microwave popcorn, is sold under the Pop Secret brand. The product line includes Homestyle microwave popcorn and items such as 94% Fat Free and 100 Calorie snack size.
- In-shell and culinary nuts are sold under the Diamond of California brand. In-shell nuts are typically sold in grocery store produce sections during the winter holiday season. Culinary nuts are sold in the baking aisle of grocery, mass, club and other retailers.
- North American and International Ingredient and Food Service products include Diamond of California brand in-shell nuts, shelled and processed nuts, glazed nuts, and custom-processed nuts for food processors, restaurants, bakeries and food service companies and suppliers.

Each of the snack product lines has “better-for-you” options including 100-calorie packs, 94% Fat Free popcorn and both baked potato chips with 65% less fat than traditional potato chips and a reduced fat chip with 40% less fat.

== Production ==
The company had about 1400 full-time employees in Wisconsin, Indiana, Tennessee, Alabama and the United Kingdom. Diamond does not grow any of its own crops; it purchases raw material from domestic and international sources. Diamond products are processed and packaged at facilities in Stockton, California; Salem, Oregon; Van Buren, Indiana; Beloit, Wisconsin; Robertsdale, Alabama; and Norwich in the United Kingdom.
