= Joseph A. Campbell =

American entrepreneur (1817–1900)

Joseph Campbell
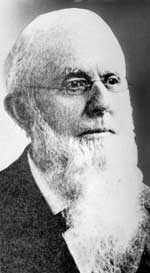
- Campbell c. 1900
- Born: Joseph Albert Campbell; May 15, 1817; Bridgeton, New Jersey, US
- Died: March 27, 1900 (aged 82); Riverton, New Jersey, US
- Occupation: Entrepreneur
- Years active: 1869–1894
- Known for: Founder of Campbell's

Joseph Albert Campbell (May 15, 1817 – March 27, 1900) was an American businessman who is best known for founding Campbell's in 1869 when he partnered with Abraham Anderson.

== Early life ==
Campbell was born on May 15, 1817, in Bridgeton, New Jersey, the son of James Campbell, a blacksmith (1786–1856) and Hannah Ogden Campbell, who married in 1810. His parents were Presbyterian fruit farmers. Joseph was one of eight brothers and sisters including Charles, James Campbell Jr., John, Hannah, Ebenezer Davis, Mary Sharp Campbell Clark and Benjamin Franklin Campbell.

== Campbell's Soup ==
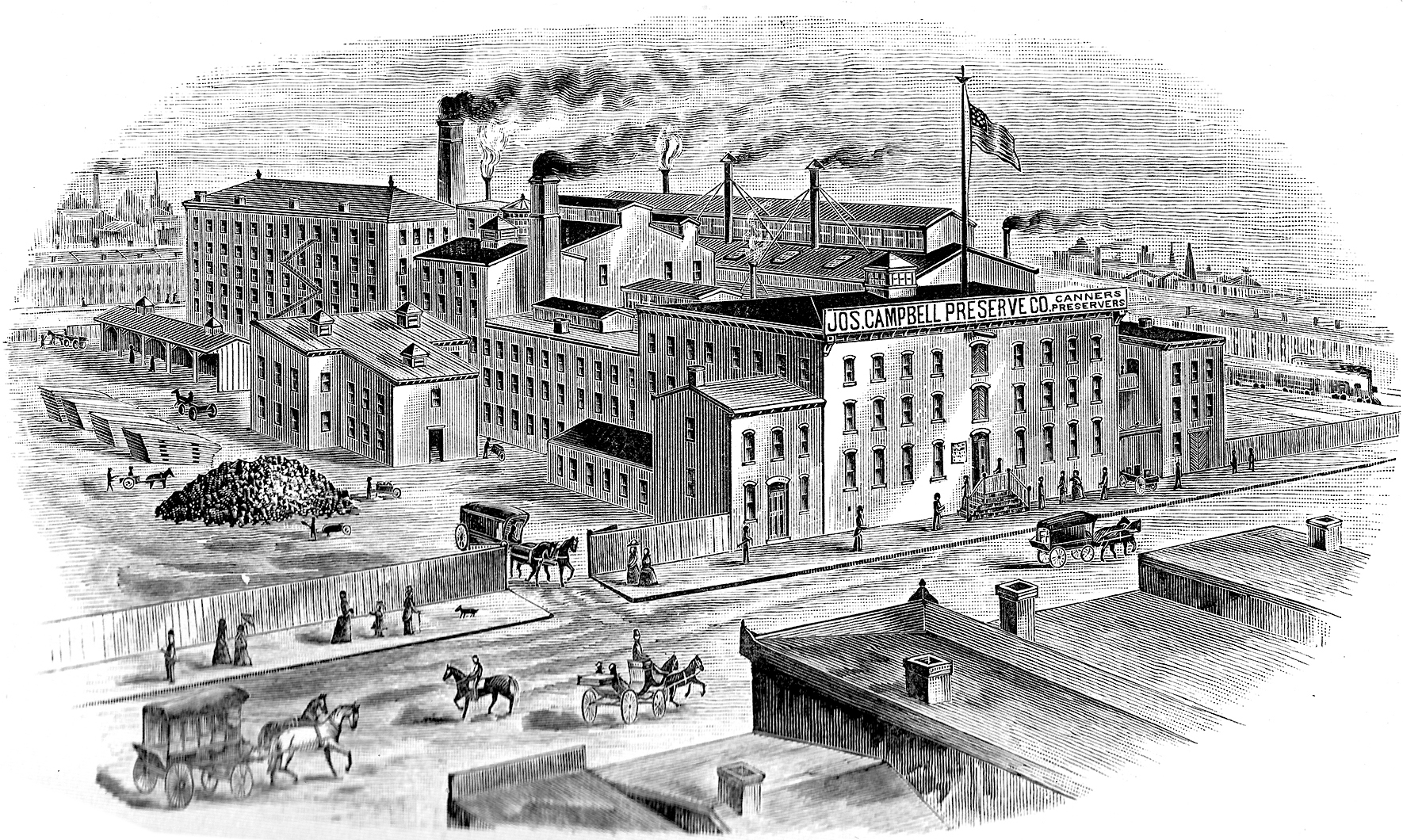
The Jos. A. Campbell Preserve Co., Camden, NJ in 1894.

In 1869, Campbell founded the company that would become Campbell's Soup. In 1894 he retired and Arthur Dorrance became the company president. In 1895 the first can of ready-to-eat tomato soup was available.

The company was reorganized into Joseph Campbell & Co. in 1896. In 1897, John T. Dorrance, a nephew of Arthur Dorrance, began working for the company at a wage of $7.50 per week. Dorrance, a chemist with degrees from MIT and Göttingen University, Germany, developed a commercially viable method for condensing soup by halving the quantity of its heaviest ingredient: water. He went on to become president of the company from 1914 to 1930, eventually buying out the Campbell family.

The classic red-and-white can design used by many Campbell's branded products is an American cultural icon, and its use in pop art was typified by Andy Warhol's series of Campbell's Soup Cans prints.

== Death ==
Campbell died on March 27, 1900, in Riverton, New Jersey. He is buried in Woodlands Cemetery in Philadelphia.
