= Eagle Snacks =

Defunct brand name of snack food

Eagle Snacks is a brand name for snack food originally introduced by the Anheuser-Busch company in 1979. Eagle Snacks is not to be confused with Eagle Brand, a trademark used by Borden to market its sweetened condensed milk and dessert lines, now owned by The J.M. Smucker Co.

== History ==
Under the Eagle Snacks label, Anheuser-Busch marketed bite-size pretzels, potato chips, cheese snacks, nuts and similar foods. Some of the snacks were in the shape of an eagle, reflecting both the brand name and the eagle in the Anheuser-Busch logo.

The Eagle Snack mix featured honey roasted peanuts, eagle-shaped pretzels and bacon-cheddar crackers that reproduced Anheuser-Busch's interlocking "A" and eagle logo.

Jack Klugman and Tony Randall of TV’s The Odd Couple starred in a number of television commercials and print ads for Eagle Snacks during the 1980s and 1990s.

The brand was ultimately unprofitable for Anheuser-Busch, which sold the brand to Procter & Gamble in 1996. P&G acquired rights to the products and brand, but not the Anheuser-Busch logo originally used to market the brand. P&G licensed the brand to Chicago-based Reserve Brands Inc. in 2007.

== Current status ==
As of August 30, 2021 the Eagle Snacks brand is owned and operated by Eagle Snacks Inc. (owned by the Raimondi family) of Farmingdale, New York.
