= Martin's Potato Chips =

American snack food company

Martin's Potato Chips Inc is a manufacturer of potato chips, popcorn, and other salted snack foods. Martin's headquarters is located in York County, Pennsylvania, at 5847 US-30 (Lincoln Highway) West in Thomasville. The company distributes to retailers in Pennsylvania and Maryland. It was founded by Harry and Fairy Martin, in 1941.

Martin's potato chips were served on Air Force One during the terms of presidents Bill Clinton and George W. Bush. The company sponsors the York Revolution professional baseball team of the Atlantic League of Professional Baseball. Martin's recycles its waste byproducts, using potato peels and refuse from the potato cleaning process for cattle feed and fertilizer. The company's plant offers factory tours.
