= Lance Inc. =

American snack brand

Lance, Inc.
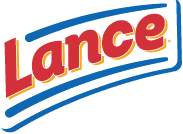
- Type: Subsidiary
- Traded as: Nasdaq: LNCE
- Industry: Food
- Founded: 1913; 113 years ago
- Founder: Phillip Lance
- Headquarters: Charlotte, North Carolina, U.S.
- Products: Snack food
- Number of employees: 5,500
- Parent: Snyder's-Lance
- Website: lance.com

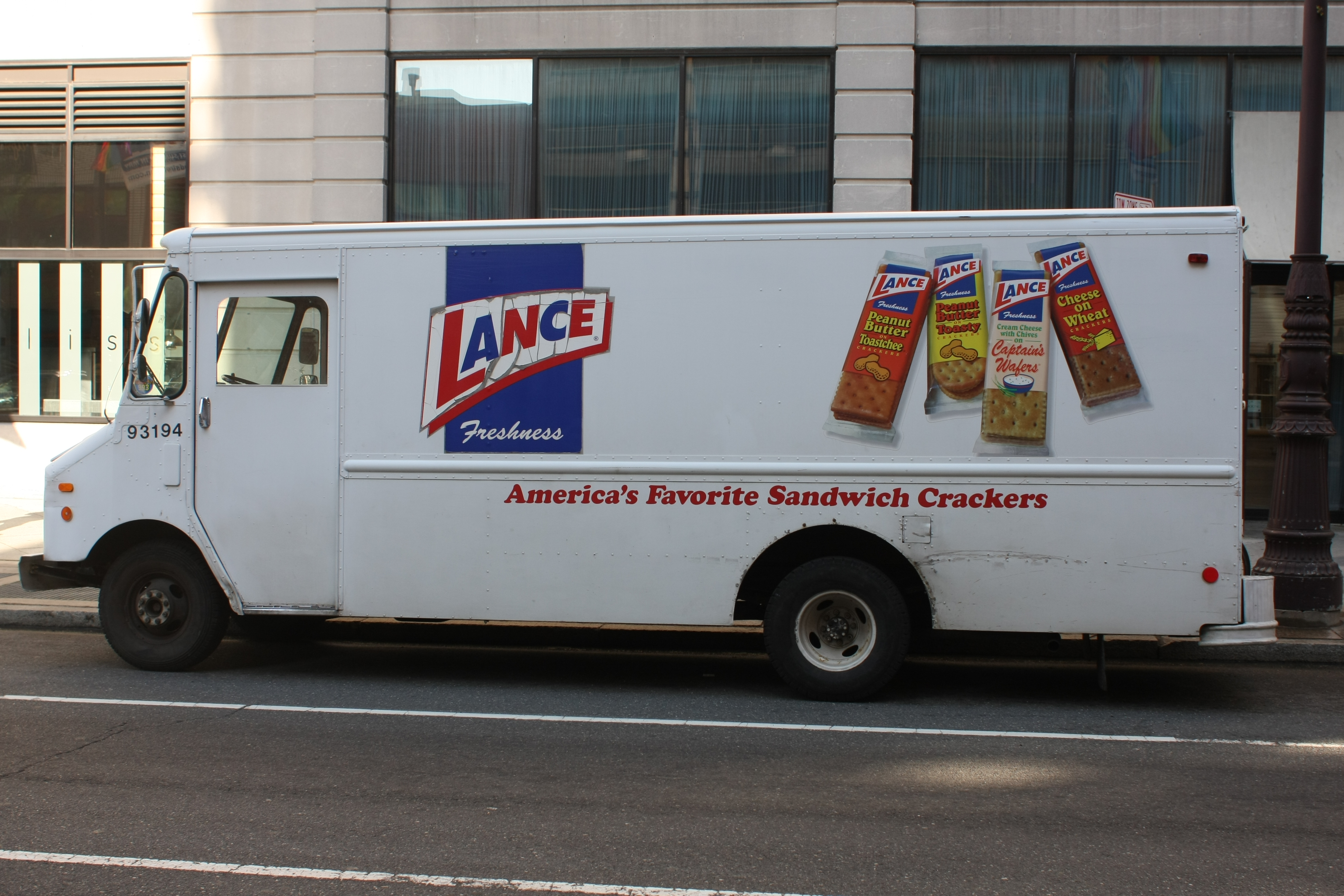
A Lance delivery van in Philadelphia, PA.

Lance, Inc. is an American brand of snack foods owned by the Snyder's-Lance company headquartered in Charlotte, North Carolina. As of 2018, Snyder's-Lance is owned by Campbell's.

== History ==
The Lance Cracker Company was founded in Charlotte, North Carolina, in 1913 by Philip Lance.

The company established a manufacturing facility in 1926 located at 310 Arlington Ave.

== Merger ==
On July 22, 2010, Lance announced that it would merge with Snyder's of Hanover. The resulting company, known as Snyder's-Lance Inc., would remain publicly traded under the LNCE symbol. The headquarters would stay in Charlotte. On December 2, Lance shareholders approved the deal that created the country's second-largest snack food company.

== Nabs ==
Many snack cracker products manufactured by Lance are commonly referred to as "nabs", a genericized trademark name for snack crackers that originated with a competitor, the Nabisco company. The term originated in 1924 when the National Biscuit Company (Nabisco) introduced a snack, put in a 5-cent sealed packet called "Peanut Sandwich Packet". They soon added a second, "Sorbetto Sandwich Packet". These packets allowed salesmen to sell to soda fountains, road stands, milk bars, lunch rooms, newsstands etc. Sales increased and in 1928 the company adopted and started to use the name NAB, which immediately won the approval of the public.

== NASCAR involvement ==
A Lance Snacks cracker display featuring the Lance Snacks sponsored car of Chase Briscoe

From the mid 1990s onward, Lance has sponsored various NASCAR race teams. The first car to receive Lance Snacks sponsorship was the #77 Buick of Mike Potter during the 1992 Mountain Dew Southern 500. Potter started 36th and would progress up to 33rd in the finishing order, completing 164 laps before an engine failed. Lance would then sporadically appear on the #20 Moroso Racing entry in 1994 and #32 Active Motorsports entry for a handful of races for 1995. This was part of a B2B sponsor deal with the Fina brand of motor oil. In 1996 Lance joined Petty Enterprises to sponsor their NASCAR Busch Grand National team. Driver Rodney Combs started off the season with a 6th place finish at the season opener at Daytona but failed to qualify for the next race at Rockingham. The team managed one more 6th place finish at Atlanta two rounds later, but overall struggled for pace with the next best result being an 11th at Richmond Raceway> Even though officially Combs only managed a best finish of sixth in 1996, he did win a 2nd place finish in the Qualifying race at Charlotte Motor Speedway in May. For the 1997 season, Combs was let go after 5 races and Dennis Setzer was hired to compete in the #43 car. Setzer's 1997 season saw him score a total of 4 top-10s including a best finish of 8th at Auto Club Speedway. For 1998 Lance jumped over to Phoenix Racing and driver Jeff Purvis. Purvis ran 26 of the 31 races with two runner up finishes at Daytona and Nazareth. Dennis Setzer, Matt Hutter, and Nathan Buttke also ran the Lance Snacks car while Purvis missed 5 races due to injury or suspension. In 1999 Purvis was healthy and ran the full year, two 3rd place finishes were his best results that year and he was able to finish in 6th in points. The Next year Lance jumper over to Team Rensi Motorsports with drivers Kenny Wallace and Andy Santerre. Randy Tolsma,Ricky Craven and Chad Chaffin also drove for the team in 2000. 2001 saw Lance jump over too Hensley Motorsports and driver Shane Hall. In 2001 The team also ran logos for Lance Snacks Chip Thunder, a Lance produced brand of Potato Chip.

After leaving the Hensley team at the end of 2001, Lance would occasionally pop in NASCAR, such as in 2010 and 2011 with both Marcos Ambrose and Bobby Labonte respectively. 2026 saw Lance Snacks return to NASCAR sponsorship as the brand announced a partnership with Joe Gibbs Racing and driver Chase Briscoe, with Briscoe also appearing on some of the promotional materials for the brand such as displays in grocery stores and packaging of products.

== Products ==
- Cracker and cookie sandwiches
  - ToastChee
  - Toasty
  - Malt
  - Whole Grain
  - Captain's Wafers
  - Nekot
  - Quick Starts
- Various flavored nuts and seeds
- Gold-n-Chees crackers
- Various flavored popcorns
