= Artificial butter flavoring =

Culinary liquid mimicking flavor of butter

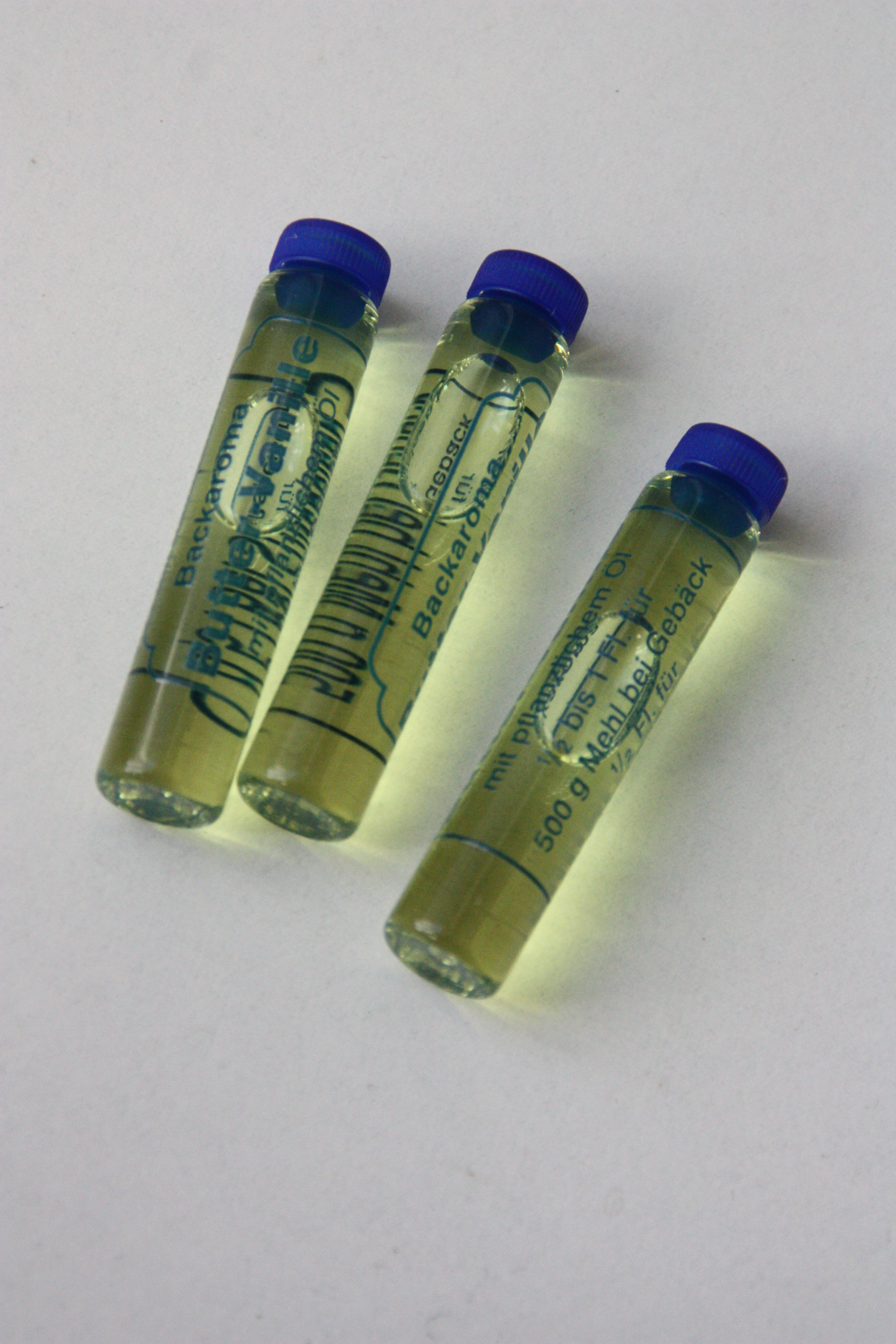
Butter-vanilla flavor, a combination of butter flavor and vanilla flavor

Artificial butter flavoring is a flavoring used to give a food the taste and smell of butter. It may contain diacetyl, acetylpropionyl, or acetoin, three natural compounds in butter that contribute to its characteristic taste and smell. Manufacturers of margarines or similar oil-based products typically add it (along with beta carotene for the yellow color) to make the final product butter-flavored, because it would otherwise be relatively tasteless.

== Butter-flavoring controversy ==
The lung disease bronchiolitis obliterans is attributed to prolonged exposure to diacetyl, e.g. in an industrial setting. Workers in several factories that manufacture artificial butter flavoring have been diagnosed with bronchiolitis obliterans, a rare and serious disease of the lungs. The disease has been called "popcorn worker's lung" or "popcorn lung" because it was first seen in former workers of a microwave popcorn factory in Missouri, but NIOSH refers to it by the more general term "flavorings-related lung disease". It has also been called "flavorings-related bronchiolitis obliterans" or diacetyl-induced bronchiolitis obliterans. People who work with flavorings that include diacetyl are at risk for flavorings-related lung disease, including those who work in popcorn factories, restaurants, other snack food factories, bakeries, candy factories, margarine and cooking spread factories, and coffee processing facilities.

In the year 2000, eight cases of bronchiolitis obliterans were detected in former employees of a microwave popcorn plant. Many of these individuals had initially been misdiagnosed as having other pulmonary diseases such as COPD and asthma. NIOSH investigated the worksite and suggested that artificial butter flavoring containing diacetyl was the most likely causative agent for the cases of bronchiolitis obliterans. Follow up investigations at the plant revealed that 25% of employees had abnormal spirometry exams. The plant effectively implemented changes reducing air concentrations of diacetyl by 1 to 3 orders of magnitude in the years following. A stabilization of respiratory symptoms was seen after this point in those who had been exposed to high levels of diacetyl. However, declines in lung function as measured by spirometry continued. Other studies also found cases of bronchiolitis obliterans in workers at 4 other microwave popcorn production facilities. Additionally further studies have demonstrated a large increase in abnormal spirometry values in workers exposed to flavoring chemicals with a clear dose-response relationship.

In 2006, the International Brotherhood of Teamsters and the United Food and Commercial Workers petitioned the U.S. OSHA to promulgate an emergency temporary standard to protect workers from the deleterious health effects of inhaling diacetyl vapors. The petition was followed by a letter of support signed by more than 30 prominent scientists. On January 21, 2009, OSHA issued an advance notice of proposed rulemaking for regulating exposure to diacetyl. The notice requests respondents to provide input regarding adverse health effects, methods to evaluate and monitor exposure, and the training of workers. That notice also solicited input regarding exposure and health effects of acetoin, acetaldehyde, acetic acid and furfural.

In 2007, two bills in the California Legislature sought to ban the use of diacetyl. The bills died in the Senate.

In 2012, Wayne Watson, a regular microwavable popcorn consumer for years, was awarded US$7.27 million in damages from a federal jury in Denver, which decided his lung disease was caused by the chemicals in microwave popcorn and that the popcorn's manufacturer, Gilster-Mary Lee Corporation, and the grocery store that sold it should have warned him of its dangers.

== Regulation ==
The European Commission has declared diacetyl is legal for use as a flavouring substance in all EU states. As a diketone, diacetyl is included in the EU's flavouring classification Flavouring Group Evaluation 11 (FGE.11). A Scientific Panel of the EU Commission evaluated six flavouring substances (not including diacetyl) from FGE.11 in 2004. As part of this study, the panel reviewed available studies on several other flavourings in FGE.11, including diacetyl. Based on the available data, the panel reiterated the finding that there were no safety concerns for diacetyl's use as a flavouring.

In 2007, the European Food Safety Authority (EFSA), the EU's food safety regulatory body, stated its scientific panel on food additives and flavourings (AFC) was evaluating diacetyl along with other flavourings as part of a larger study.

In 2007, the Flavor and Extract Manufacturers Association recommended reducing diacetyl in butter flavorings. Manufacturers of butter flavored popcorn including Pop Weaver, Trail's End, and ConAgra Foods (maker of Orville Redenbacher's and Act II) began removing diacetyl as an ingredient from their products.

A 2010 U.S. OSHA Safety and Health Information Bulletin and companion Worker Alert recommend employers use safety measures to minimize exposure to diacetyl or its substitutes.
