= List of popcorn brands =

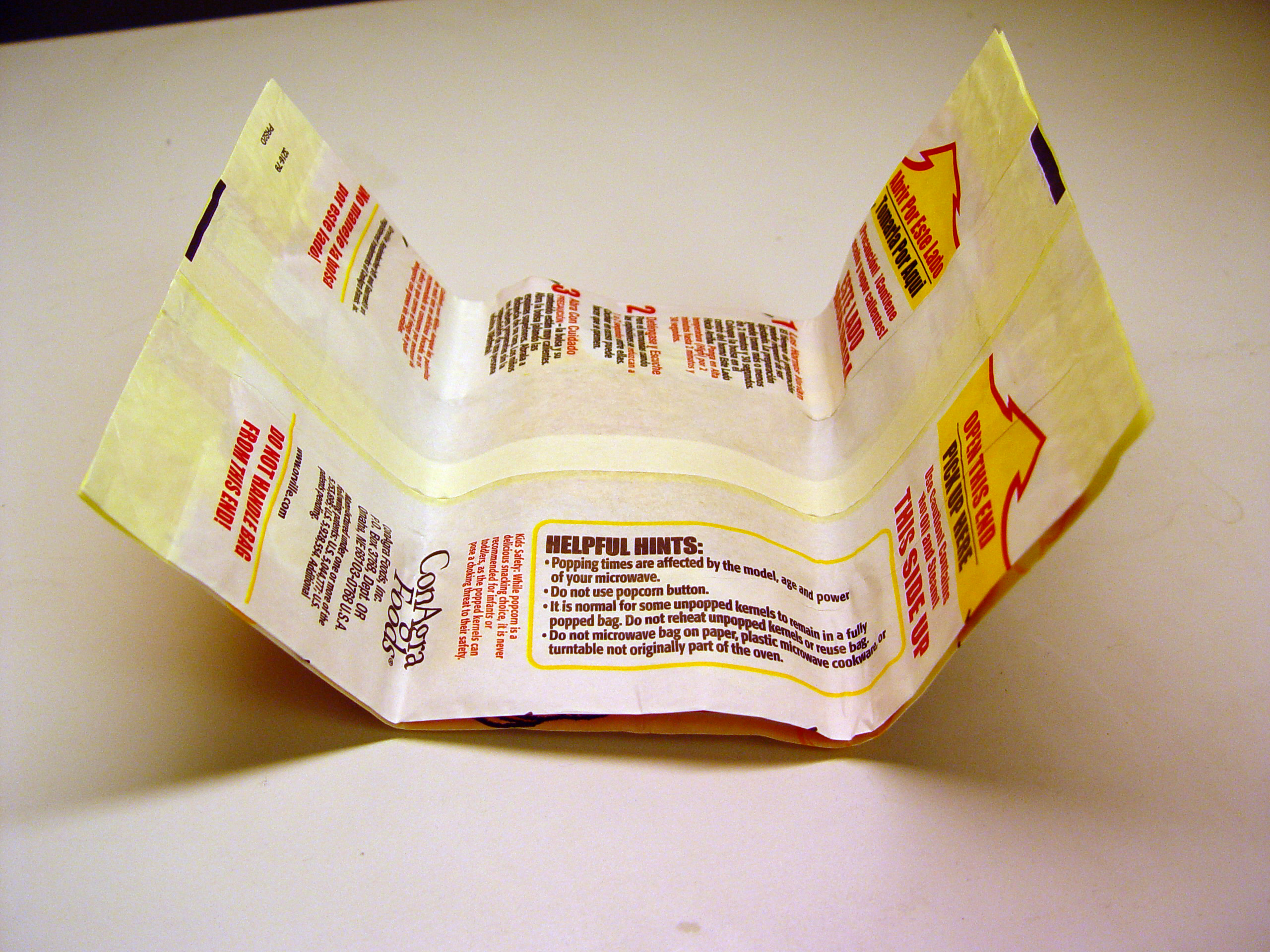
An uncooked bag of microwave popcorn

This is a list of notable popcorn brands. Popcorn, also known as popping corn, is a type of corn (maize, Zea mays var. everta) that expands from the kernel and puffs up when heated. Popcorn is able to pop because its kernels have a hard moisture-sealed hull and a dense starchy interior. Pressure builds inside the kernel, and a small explosion (or "pop") is the end result. Some strains of corn are now cultivated specifically as popping corns.

Microwave popcorn is unpopped popcorn in an enhanced, sealed paper bag intended to be heated in a microwave oven. In addition to the dried corn the bags typically contain solidified cooking oil, one or more seasonings (often salt), and natural or artificial flavorings, or both. With the many different flavors, there are many different manufacturers.

== Notable popcorn brands ==
Name	Image	Origin	Description
Act II		United States (Minnesota)	Preceded by Act I in 1981, an early microwave popcorn stored in the refrigerator and based on the look and taste of movie theater popcorn. In 1984, Act II, a shelf stable microwave popcorn was released, becoming the first mass-marketed microwave popcorn.
American Pop Corn Company		United States (Iowa)	Founded in 1914 by a farmer. Sold under the name "Jolly Time" in cans, the company later added microwave popcorn and began selling in Europe.
Angie's BOOMCHICKAPOP Popcorn		United States (Minnesota)	The producers originally distributed their kettle corn product in 2002 outside the Metrodome during Minnesota Vikings home games. Angie's popcorn is now sold in a variety of retailers nationwide.
Bob’s Red Mill Popcorn		United States Oregon	Bob’s Red Mill sources the majority of its ingredients from North America.
Butterkist		United States (Kentucky)	In 1914, vendors began buying Butter-Kist popcorn machines for venues such as cinemas. In 1938 the machines made their way to United Kingdom, and after the Second World War, the company developed into the UK's lead selling popcorn brand. In 1998 it moved production to West Yorkshire.
Cape Cod		United States (Massachusetts)	Cape Cod Potato Chips was founded in 1980 with the idea of offering healthier foods made with little processing, starting with potato chip making. Types of popcorn include Kettle Corn, Sea Salt, and White Cheddar.
Cracker Jack		United States (Chicago, Illinois)	Consists of molasses-flavored caramel-coated popcorn and peanuts, well known for being packaged with a prize of trivial value inside. The Cracker Jack name was registered in 1896, and some food historians consider it the first junk food.
Crunch 'n Munch		United States	Consisting of caramel-coated popcorn and peanuts with various flavors, Crunch 'n Munch was first sold in 1966 by the Franklin Nut Company.
Fiddle Faddle		United States	Popped popcorn covered with either caramel or butter toffee and mixed with peanuts, the snack was introduced in 1967 and is commonly found in discount and drug stores.
Jiffy Pop		United States	First marketed as Jiffy Pop in 1959, original Jiffy Pop packages used an aluminum pan held over a stove to pop corn.
Karmelkorn		United States (Wyoming)	Founded in 1929, the retailer initially sold popcorn and caramel corn out of downtown storefronts, operating out of shopping malls by the 1960s. After 1986, Dairy Queen began co-branding Karmelkorn with the Dairy Queen and Orange Julius brands.
Kirkland Signature		United States	"Kirkland Signature" is Costco's private label. It is sold by Costco at their website and warehouses, and is trademarked by the company.
Lolly Gobble Bliss Bombs		Australia	Originally released in the 1970s, it is caramelised, ready-to-eat popcorn, similar to the American Cracker Jack. The popcorn is coated with toffee and rolled in crushed peanuts.
Lucky Elephant Popcorn		Canada	On the snack food market since the 1950s, it has generally retailed at mom and pop grocery stores, carnivals, concession stands, arenas and neighborhood food outlets, and more recently major grocery outlets.
Market Pantry		United States	Brand of popcorn sold at Target.
Orville Redenbacher's		United States(Indiana)	Brand of popcorn launched to the public in 1969.
Pop Secret		United States (Minnesota)	First launched to the public in 1984. In 2014, Pop Secret introduced a pre-popped popcorn in a bag.
Pop Weaver		United States (Indiana)	Founded in 1928, customers include store chains around the world, as well as concessionaires, and international popcorn distributors. In 2007, the Weaver Popcorn Company became the first company to remove diacetyl, a controversial butter flavoring, from its Pop Weaver microwave popcorn products.
Popcorn, Indiana		United States	Best known for its kettle corn.
Poppycock		United States	The original mixture consisted of clusters of popcorn, almonds, and pecans covered in a candy glaze. Poppycock is estimated to have been invented in the 1950s. Production moved in 1960 to Illinois, and a second ownership change occurred in 1991.
Screaming Yellow Zonkers		United States	Popcorn with a yellow sugary glaze, in a black box, the product was developed in 1968. Zonkers were geared toward those who enjoy sweetened popcorn without nuts, as opposed to products like Cracker Jack. Screaming Yellow Zonkers were kosher, but did contain dairy products.
Smartfood		United States (Massachusetts)	Smartfood was first created in 1985. A pre-popped popcorn with real cheese, in January 1989, the company was sold to Frito-Lay.
SkinnyPop		United States (Texas)	SkinnyPop was founded in Illinois in 2010. Its parent company, Amplify Snack Brands, was bought by Hershey Co. in 2017.
Tiny but Mighty Popcorn		United States (Iowa)	Initially founded as K&K Popcorn in 1981.
Trail's End		United States	Trail's End is a candied popcorn brand sold by the Boy Scouts of America and Scouts Canada in fund raising, in collaboration with Pop Weaver. Available flavors from year to year vary.

== See also ==
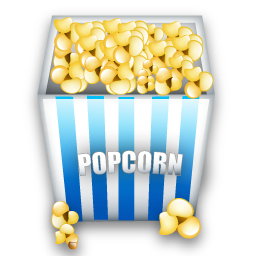

- List of brand name snack foods
- List of confectionery brands
- List of chocolate-covered foods
- List of American desserts
