= Nuts on Clark =

Popcorn and nuts retailer and manufacturer

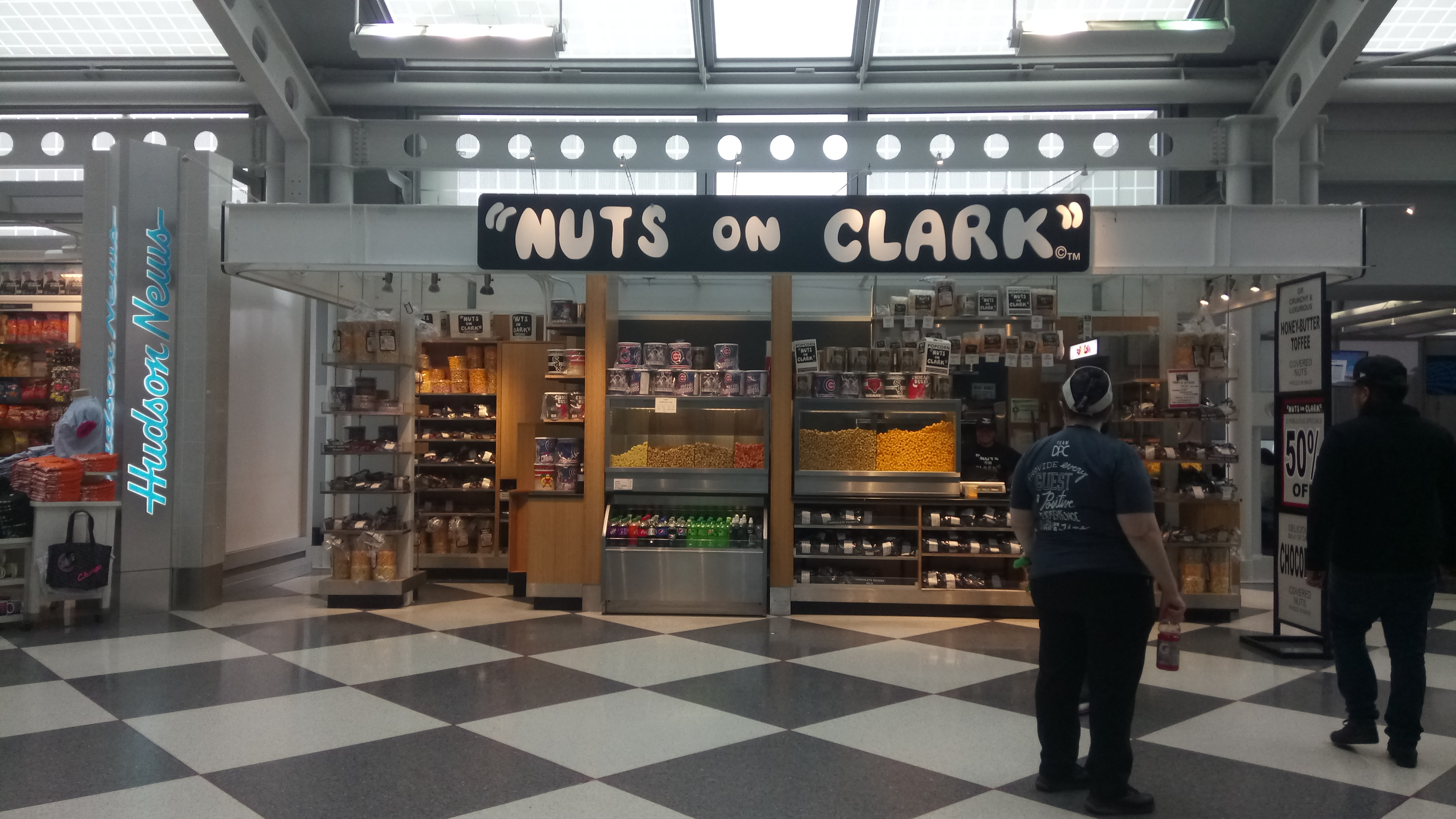
- Nuts on Clark concourse at O'Hare International Airport
- Founded: 1979; 46 years ago on Clark Street in Chicago
- Founders: Herbert Kenney; Estelle Kenney
- Headquarters: Chicago, Illinois, United States
- Owners: Carla Kenney; Robert Kenney
- Website: nutsonclark.com

Nuts on Clark is a gourmet popcorn, caramel corn, cheese corn, and nuts retailer and manufacturer based on the north side of Chicago. Located on Clark Street near Wrigley Field, the company was founded by a Chicago couple in 1979. The company name founded based on its location and initially sold an assortment of nuts along with their now most popular popcorn. Herbert Kenney founded it while Estelle, his wife, created the "NUTS ON CLARK" name, logo and store designs. Nuts on Clark has since expanded to locations at O'Hare International Airport and Chicago Midway International Airport as well as Soldier Field and Chicago Union Station, becoming known as something of a Chicago icon. In 1988, they made the move to remove their nut inventory and only stay in the gourmet popcorn business. Nuts on Clark also ships tins of their popcorn nationwide (minus Alaska and Hawaii).

In 1992, Nuts on Clark caramel popcorn was featured in Saveur magazine as the best caramel corn in the country; they have also been featured in the Chicago Tribune, the Chicago Sun-Times, and a number of other local publications, including the WGN Radio Noon Show.
