= Karmelkorn =

American popcorn retailer

- Company type: Subsidiary
- Founded: May 15, 1929; 97 years ago
- Founder: Bill O'Sullivan
- Defunct: May 2019; 7 years ago
- Fate: Support Ended; Inactive
- Area served: United States
- Products: Popcorn, caramel corn
- Owner: Berkshire Hathaway
- Parent: Dairy Queen

Karmelkorn was an American popcorn retailer. It was founded in 1928 in Casper, Wyoming, by Mr. and Mrs. William O'Sullivan. The O'Sullivans patented their candy-coated popcorn and trademarked the product's name and logo in 1929. Initially, they licensed the product to existing confectioneries before creating a chain of franchised Karmelkorn stores. Within four years, the O'Sullivans had 535 stores licensed to sell its product in North America including candy stores and peanut / popcorn stands. The original slogan of the product was "Delicious Karmelkorn: The Flavor That Can Not be Copied."

Licensed Karmelkorn merchants sold popcorn, caramel corn, and candied popcorn balls out of downtown storefronts and in tourist areas by beaches and resorts in its first generation. But by the 1960s under new owners, it began operating as Karmelkorn Shoppes, Incorporated. The chain dropped its licensing program and, instead, franchised Karemelkorn Shoppe storefronts which were popular in suburban strip shopping centers and shopping malls. Franchise Growth Corporation in Rock Island, Illinois, acquired Karmelkorn Shoppes Inc. in 1969. By 1982, the chain had 270 stand-alone Karemelkorn shops in 43 states.

In 1986, Dairy Queen's parent company IDQ (now part of Berkshire Hathaway) purchased Karmelkorn Shoppes, Inc. Dairy Queen began co-branding Karmelkorn with the Dairy Queen and Orange Julius brands. Beginning in 1987, many locations with the three product lines were rebranded as Dairy Queen Treat Centers. With the decline of shopping malls and the expiration of Karmelkorn leases in the malls, the chain eroded. By 2019, there were just six remaining Karmelkorn locations. In May of 2019, Dairy Queen International dropped support for its final six locations though retaining the Karmelkorn name and trademark. The brand is presently inactive.

== See also ==
- List of popcorn brands
