= Charles Bowman =

Charles Bowman may refer to:

- Charles Calvin Bowman (1852–1941), U.S. representative from Pennsylvania
- Charles F. Bowman (1919–2009), American businessman
- Charles Lewis Bowman (1890–1971), American architect
- Charles Martin Bowman (1863–1932), Ontario businessman and political figure
- Charles Sumner Bowman (1873–?), African American architect
- Charles Bowman (accountant) (born 1962), Lord Mayor of London
- Chuck Bowman (born 1937), American actor, director and writer
- Chuck Bowman (American football), former American football coach and athletics administrator
- Charlie Bowman, American old-time fiddle player and string band leader
