= Weaver Popcorn Company =

U.S. popcorn company

The Weaver Popcorn Company, based in Van Buren, Indiana, is one of the largest popcorn companies in the United States.

== History ==
Founded in 1928 by Ira E. Weaver (whose family still controls the company), the company develops, grows, processes, packages, and ships a variety of popcorn products internationally. Its customers include international store chains, concessionaires, and international popcorn distributors. In 2007, the Weaver Popcorn Company became the first company to remove diacetyl, a controversial butter flavoring, from its microwave popcorn products sold under the Pop Weaver brand. As of 2025 Pop Weaver microwave popcorn is now made by an independently operating company, Weaver Popcorn Manufacturing, although it remains owned by the same family. A third company in the family, Weaver Popcorn Hybrids, focuses on popcorn seeds.

== Products ==
=== Pop Weaver ===
Weaver uses canola oil in its products. Flavors for microwave oven products include Butter, Light Butter, Extra Butter, Kettle Corn, Caramel, Cinnamon Roll, Jalapeño Cheddar and Parmesan and Herb. Flavors for concession sale include Weaver Gold, Caramel & Sweet, Premium Hybrid Yellow, Candy Cane flavor, Almond, and chocolate-dipped. Flavors for pre-popped popcorn include Caramel Corn with Peanuts and Dash of Salt.

=== Trail's End ===
Trail's End is a brand sold by Scouting America in fundraising. Available flavors from year to year vary, but include Caramel Corn, Butter Light (microwave), Unbelievable Butter (microwave), Kettle Corn (microwave), Caramel Corn with Almonds & Pecans, Butter Toffee Caramel Corn, Salted Caramel Corn, White Cheddar Cheese, Cheddar Cheese, Jalapeño Cheddar, Cheese Lover's Collection, Sweet and Savory Collection and Popping Corn. They also have chocolate products that include Chocolatey Peanut Clusters and Chocolatey Caramel Crunch. Consumers can also donate popcorn to the U.S. military and first responders by making a cash contribution. Trail's End sends popcorn to the armed services stationed both domestically and internationally, including in combat areas.

== See also ==
- List of popcorn brands
