= American Pop Corn Company =

American food company

- Type: Private Corporation
- Founded: 1914
- Founder: Cloid H Smith
- Headquarters: Sioux City, Iowa, U.S.
- Key people: Steve Huisenga, President; Garrett Smith, Director; Carlton Smith, Director
- Products: Blast O' Butter, Butterlicious, Better Butter, White and Buttery, Crispy 'n White, KettleMania, The Big Cheez, Mallow Magic, Sassy Salsa, Sea Salt & Cracked Pepper
- Website: www.jollytime.com

The American Pop Corn Company, established in 1914, is a family-owned business headquartered in Sioux City, Iowa. It is the oldest popcorn producer in the United States and is best known for its Jolly Time brand, which is sold nationally and internationally. The company employs approximately 185 people.

== History ==
The American Pop Corn Company was founded by Cloid H. Smith, who began experimenting with popcorn production after becoming dissatisfied with the prices at which popcorn from his farm was being sold. He started the business in the basement of his home in Schaller, Iowa, with the assistance of his son, Howard.

In its first year, the company sold over 75,000 pounds of popcorn. To meet growing demand, Smith built a storage crib in 1914 and a shelling and cleaning facility in 1915.

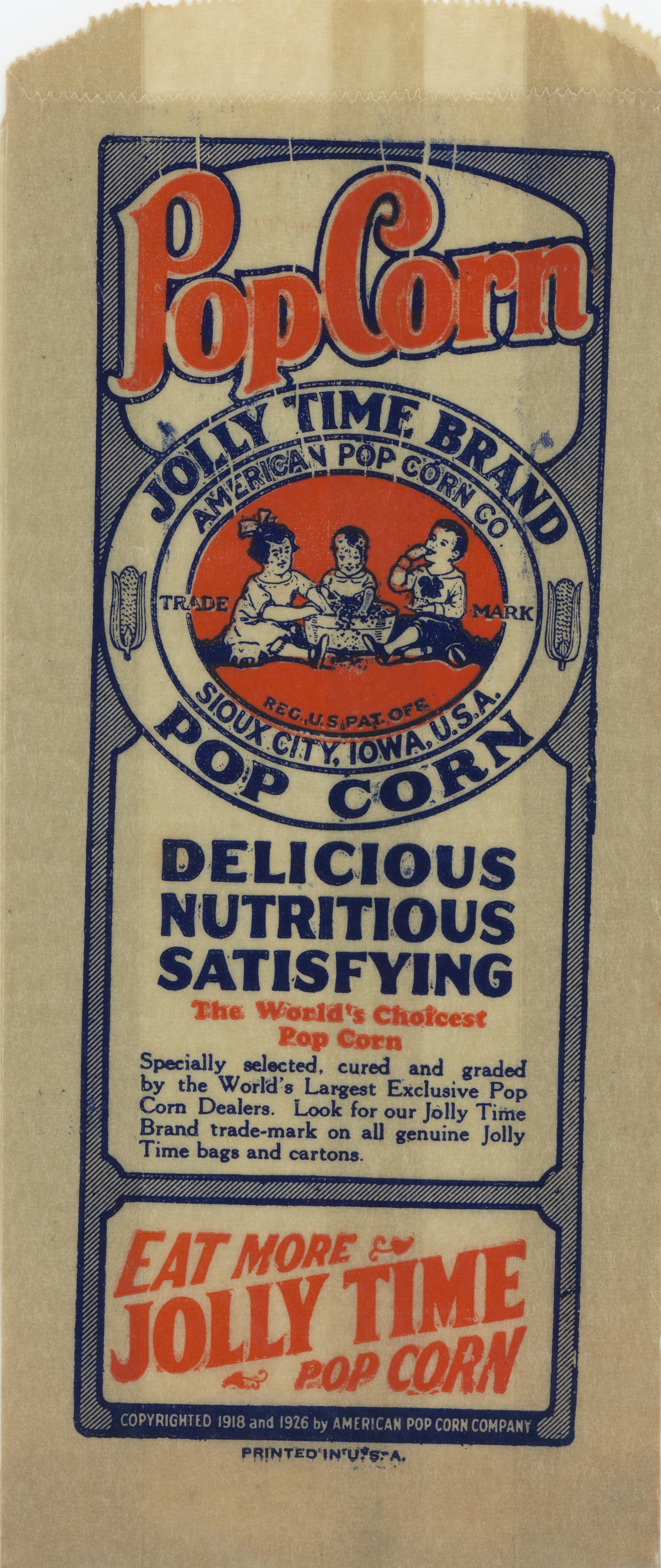
A wrapper sleeve from the company from 1926

In 1924, the company transitioned from cardboard to using metal cans for packaging, which helped preserve the freshness of the popcorn. This innovation led to the company's adoption of the slogan "Guaranteed to Pop."

The economic growth of the American Pop Corn Company was further supported by the rise in popularity of radio, movie theaters, and television in the 1930s and 1940s. Popcorn became a popular snack for people gathered around these entertainment mediums. Additionally, popcorn was an affordable food during the Great Depression, and its popularity continued to grow during the economic boom following World War II.

In 1953, the Floyd River flooded, affecting much of Sioux City. Cloid's grandson, Wrede Smith, led a project in collaboration with the Sioux City Chamber of Commerce to rechannel the river. The project took three years to complete and cost $19.6 million.

To strengthen the Jolly Time brand in the face of increased competition, the company began using celebrity endorsements, including figures like Danny Kaye, Bob Hope, and Ozzie and Harriet Nelson, and advertised on popular game shows such as Let's Make a Deal. In keeping with industry trends, the company switched to plastic packaging for its popcorn.

The introduction of the microwave oven in the 1970s revolutionized the popcorn industry. Jolly Time capitalized on this by introducing microwave popcorn, which led to increased sales and the construction of a new plant. The company also expanded its reach to Europe during this time. In 2003, the company sold its one-billionth bag of microwave popcorn.

As of 2024, the American Pop Corn Company remained family-operated, with the fourth generation of the Smith family at the helm and the fifth generation also employed in the business. According to the company, their product and work culture are reflected in their company address — One Fun Place, Sioux City, Iowa. In 2024, for the first time in its history, a non-family member was chosen for the role of president, while still having Smith family members on the board of directors.

== In the news ==
A Colorado man developed a rare respiratory illness — bronchiolitis obliterans ("popcorn lung") — after consuming about two bags of popcorn every day for 10 years. In 2007, he filed a lawsuit against popcorn maker Gilster-Mary Lee and grocery store chain Kroger, claiming his illness was due to inhaling diacetyl, an additive to microwave popcorn which gives the buttery flavor. While the chemical occurs naturally in foods such as butter, cheese, and fruits and is deemed safe for consumption., it had been known to cause broncheolitis obliterans in plant workers who handle the chemical.

In response to the complaint, popcorn manufacturers, including the American Pop Corn Company (Jolly Time), no longer use diacetyl in their products.

== See also ==
- List of popcorn brands

== Homepage ==
- Jolly Time Official site
