= Lucky Elephant Popcorn =

Canadian popcorn confectionery

Logo

Lucky Elephant Pink Candy Popcorn is a Canadian confection that has been on the snack food market since the 1950s. It is commonly found retailed at mom and pop grocery stores, carnivals, concession stands, arenas and neighbourhood food outlets, and more recently is being launched in major grocery outlets across Canada.

== Description ==
Lucky Elephant Pink Candy Popcorn is sold in 70g boxes and comes with a small prize inside. The popcorn is caramelized with a pink candy coating. Unlike Cracker Jack, the product does not contain peanuts.

Lucky Elephant Pink Candy Popcorn is a Canadian confection (nostalgic / retro) snack that has been on the snack food market since the 1950s. Not widely available in mainstream grocery stores or large convenience store chains, the treat is more commonly found retailed at mom and pop grocery stores, carnivals, concession stands, arenas and neighbourhood food outlets.

== Manufacturer ==
Lucky Elephant Pink Candy Popcorn is produced and distributed by Poppa Corn Corp. of Toronto, Ontario.

== See also ==
- List of popcorn brands
