= Diacetyl =

Organic chemical compound (CH3CO)2

- Structural formula

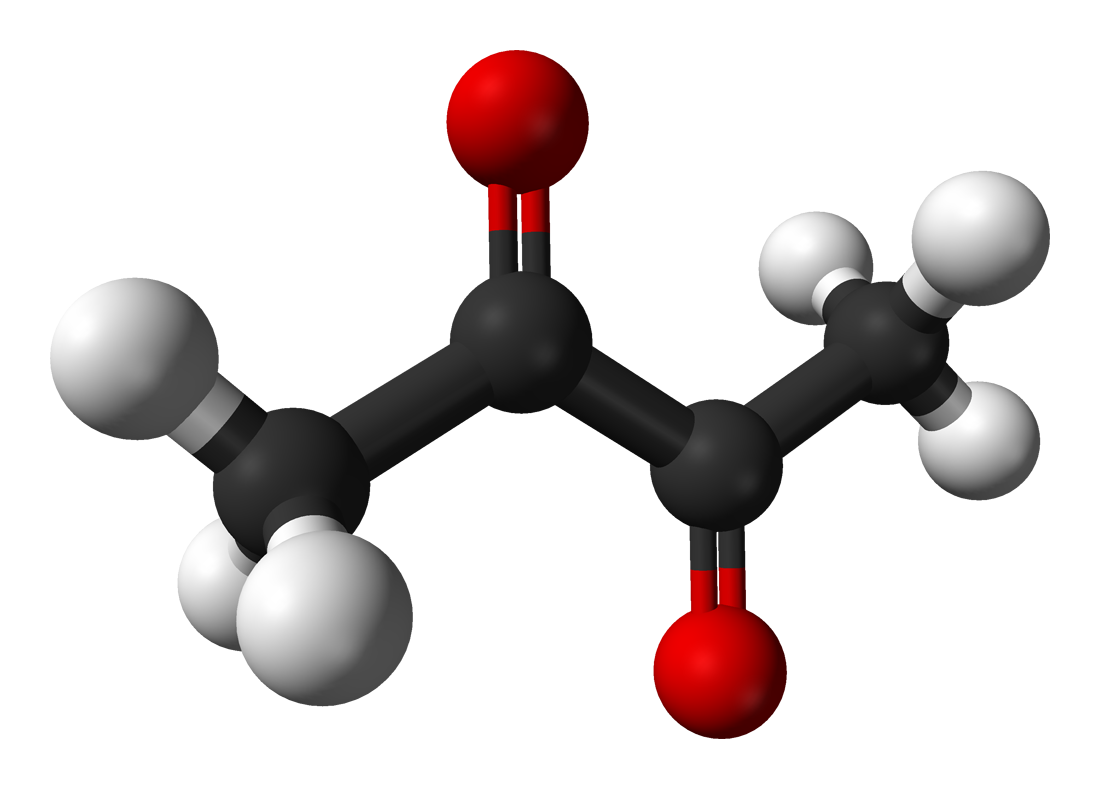
- Ball-and-stick model

Names
- Preferred IUPAC name Butane-2,3-dione
- Other names Biacetyl; Dimethyl diketone 2,3-Diketobutane

Identifiers
CAS Number	431-03-8
3D model (JSmol)	Interactive image
Beilstein Reference	605398
ChEBI	CHEBI:16583
ChEMBL	ChEMBL365809
ChemSpider	630
ECHA InfoCard	100.006.428
EC Number	207-069-8
KEGG	C00741
PubChem CID	650
RTECS number	EK2625000
UNII	K324J5K4HM
UN number	2346
CompTox Dashboard (EPA)	DTXSID6021583
- InChI: InChI=1S/C4H6O2/c1-3(5)4(2)6/h1-2H3 Key: QSJXEFYPDANLFS-UHFFFAOYSA-N; InChI=1/C4H6O2/c1-3(5)4(2)6/h1-2H3 Key: QSJXEFYPDANLFS-UHFFFAOYAX
- SMILES: CC(=O)C(=O)C

Properties
Chemical formula	C_{4}H_{6}O_{2}
Molar mass	86.090 g·mol^{−1}
Appearance	Yellow liquid
Density	0.990 g/mL at 15 °C
Melting point	−2 to −4 °C (28 to 25 °F; 271 to 269 K)
Boiling point	88 °C (190 °F; 361 K)
Solubility in water	200 g/L (20 °C)

Hazards
- Occupational safety and health (OHS/OSH)
Main hazards	Harmful, flammable
- GHS labelling
Pictograms	(GHS02: Flammable) (GHS05: Corrosive) (GHS06: Toxic) (GHS07: Exclamation mark) (GHS08: Health hazard)
Signal word	Danger
Hazard statements	H225, H302, H315, H317, H318, H331, H373
Precautionary statements	P210, P233, P240, P241, P242, P243, P260, P264, P270, P271, P272, P280, P301+P312, P302+P352, P303+P361+P353, P304+P340, P305+P351+P338, P310, P311, P314, P321, P330, P332+P313, P333+P313, P362, P363, P370+P378, P403+P233, P403+P235, P405, P501
NFPA 704 (fire diamond)	2 3 0
Safety data sheet (SDS)	External MSDS
- Except where otherwise noted, data are given for materials in their standard state (at 25 °C [77 °F], 100 kPa). verify (what is ?) Infobox references

Diacetyl (/daɪjəˈsiːtəl/ dy-yuh-SEE-tuhl; IUPAC systematic name: butanedione or butane-2,3-dione) is an organic compound with the chemical formula (CH_{3}CO)_{2}. It is a yellow liquid with an intensely buttery flavor. It is a vicinal diketone (two C=O groups, side-by-side). Diacetyl occurs naturally in alcoholic beverages and some cheeses and is added as a flavoring to some foods to impart its buttery flavor. Chronic inhalation exposure to diacetyl fumes is a causative agent of the lung disease bronchiolitis obliterans, commonly known as "popcorn lung".

== Chemical structure ==
A distinctive feature of diacetyl (and other vicinal diketones) is the long C–C bond linking the carbonyl centers. This bond distance is about 1.54 Å, compared to 1.45 Å for the corresponding C–C bond in 1,3-butadiene. The elongation is attributed to repulsion between the polarized carbonyl carbon centers.

== Occurrence and biosynthesis ==
Diacetyl arises naturally as a byproduct of fermentation. In some fermentative bacteria, it is formed via the thiamine pyrophosphate-mediated condensation of pyruvate and acetyl CoA. Sour (cultured) cream, cultured buttermilk, and cultured butter are produced by inoculating pasteurized cream or milk with a lactic starter culture, churning (agitating) and holding the milk until a desired pH drop (or increase in acidity) is attained. Cultured cream, cultured butter, and cultured buttermilk owe their tart flavour to lactic acid bacteria and their buttery aroma and taste to diacetyl. Malic acid can be converted to lactic acid to make diacetyl.

== Production ==
Diacetyl is produced industrially by dehydrogenation of 2,3-butanediol. Acetoin is an intermediate.

== Applications ==
=== In food products ===
Diacetyl and acetoin are two compounds that give butter its characteristic taste. Because of this, manufacturers of artificial butter flavoring, margarines or similar oil-based products typically add diacetyl and acetoin (along with beta-carotene for the yellow color) to make the final product butter-flavored, because it would otherwise be relatively tasteless.

=== Electronic cigarettes ===
Diacetyl is used as a flavoring agent in some liquids used in electronic cigarettes. People nearby may be exposed to it in the exhaled aerosol at levels near the limit set for occupational exposure. However, studies on the human effects of Diacytl have been inconclusive, and the effect of human inhalation has not been positively correlated with vaping inhalation or second hand vapor inhalation.Thimraj et al Johns et al Pierce et al

=== In alcoholic beverages ===
In some styles of beer (e.g. in Czech lagers and many beer styles produced in the United Kingdom, such as stouts, English bitters, and Scottish ales), the presence of diacetyl can be acceptable or desirable at low or, in some cases, moderate levels. In other styles, its presence is considered a flaw or undesirable.

Diacetyl is produced during fermentation as a byproduct of valine synthesis, when yeast produces α-acetolactate, which escapes the cell and is spontaneously decarboxylated into diacetyl. The yeast then absorbs the diacetyl, and reduces the ketone groups to form acetoin and 2,3-butanediol.

Beer sometimes undergoes a "diacetyl rest", in which its temperature is raised slightly for two or three days after fermentation is complete, to allow the yeast to absorb the diacetyl it produced earlier in the fermentation cycle. The makers of some wines, such as chardonnay, deliberately promote the production of diacetyl because of the feel and flavor it imparts. Diacetyl is present in some chardonnays known as "butter bombs", although there is a trend back toward the more traditional French styles.

Concentrations from 0.005 mg/L to 1.7 mg/L were measured in chardonnay wines, and the amount needed for the flavor to be noticed is at least 0.2 mg/L.

== Use as butter flavoring ==
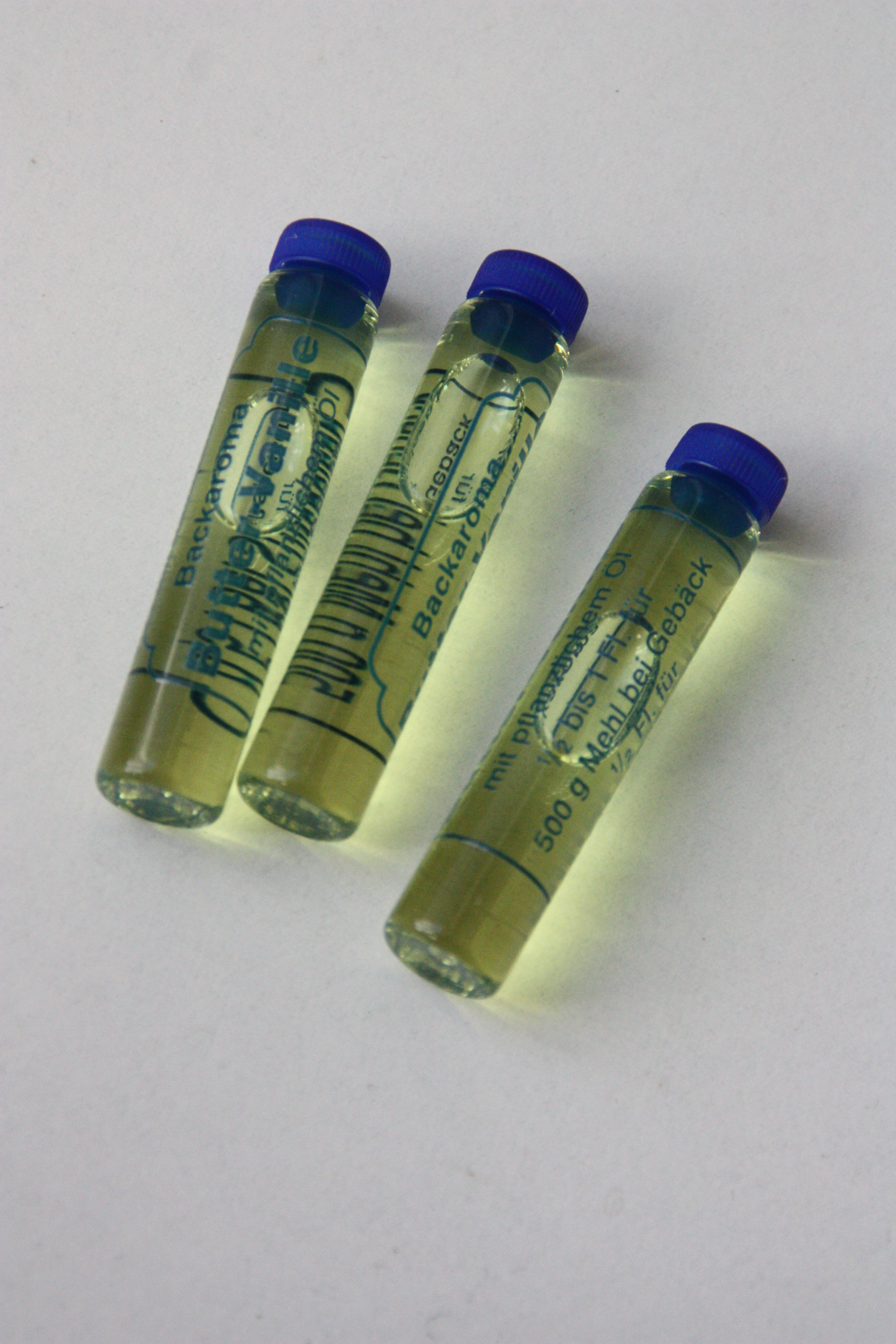
Butter-vanilla flavor, a combination of butter and vanilla flavors

=== Butter-flavoring controversy ===
Chronic industrial exposure to diacetyl fumes, such as in the microwave popcorn production industry, has been associated with bronchiolitis obliterans, a rare and life-threatening form of non-reversible obstructive lung disease in which the bronchioles (small airway branches) are compressed and narrowed by fibrosis (scar tissue) and/or inflammation.

=== Regulation ===
The European Commission has declared diacetyl is legal for use as a flavouring substance in all EU states. As a diketone, diacetyl is included in the EU's flavouring classification Flavouring Group Evaluation 11 (FGE.11). A Scientific Panel of the EU Commission evaluated six flavouring substances (not including diacetyl) from FGE.11 in 2004. As part of this study, the panel reviewed available studies on several other flavourings in FGE.11, including diacetyl. Based on the available data, the panel reiterated the finding that there were no safety concerns for diacetyl's use as a flavouring.

In 2007, the European Food Safety Authority (EFSA), the EU's food safety regulatory body, stated its scientific panel on food additives and flavourings (AFC) was evaluating diacetyl along with other flavourings as part of a larger study.

In 2007, the Flavor and Extract Manufacturers Association recommended reducing diacetyl in butter flavorings. Manufacturers of butter flavored popcorn including Pop Weaver, Trail's End, and ConAgra Foods (maker of Orville Redenbacher's and Act II) began removing diacetyl as an ingredient from their products.

A 2010 U.S. OSHA Safety and Health Information Bulletin and companion Worker Alert recommend employers use safety measures to minimize exposure to diacetyl or its substitutes.

Diacetyl is banned in e-liquids/e-cigarettes in the EU under the EU Tobacco Products Directive.

== See also ==
- Acetylpropionyl, a similar diketone
- Acetoin
- Bronchiolitis obliterans
