= Charles F. Bowman =

American businessman (1919–2009)

- Born: May 3, 1919; Lowell, Indiana
- Died: April 8, 2009 (aged 89); Holland, Michigan
- Occupations: Entrepreneur; Businessman
- Spouse: Mary Bowman

Charles F. Bowman (May 3, 1919 – April 8, 2009) was an American businessman who partnered with Orville Redenbacher to create a popping corn which won a third of the US market for unpopped popcorn by the mid-1970s. The corn was marketed as Orville Redenbacher's and is now owned by ConAgra Brands.

Charlie Bowman graduated from Purdue University. In 1951, Bowman and Redenbacher bought Chester, Inc., a company based in Boone Grove, Indiana, that specialized in hybrid seeds. Redenbacher's eponymous popcorn was the result of nearly twenty years of research at Chester and was launched in 1970. Bowman served as the company's president while Redenbacher drove the scientific research. Bowman retired as president in 2006 at age 87.

Bowman lived in Holland, Michigan after his retirement. He died in 2009, almost 14 years after Redenbacher's death. Bowman's survivors included his wife of 64 years, Mary, and three daughters: Judy Anthrop, June Bowman and Connie Bowman.
