= Tiny but Mighty Popcorn =

American popcorn brand

- Industry: Food
- Predecessor: K&K Popcorn
- Founded: 1981; 44 years ago in Urbana, Iowa, United States
- Founder: Richard Kelty
- Headquarters: Shellsburg, Iowa, United States
- Area served: United States
- Revenue: $3 million–$5 million (2015)
- Owners: Gene Mealhow; Lynn Mealhow
- Number of employees: 18 (2015)
- Website: tinybutmightyfoods.com

Tiny but Mighty Popcorn is an American brand of heirloom popcorn, introduced in 1981, when Iowa farmer Richard Kelty founded K&K Popcorn. Iowa farmers Gene and Lynn Mealhow later purchased the company in 1999, and subsequently renamed it.

== History ==
=== Kelty family ===
Since 1854, the ancestors of Richard Kelty (1936-2015) had been growing an heirloom popcorn variety out of small kernels, whose hulls would disintegrate after being popped, resulting in a richer taste. The popcorn had been introduced to the Kelty family by Native Americans, who shared it with them. The Kelty family had never sold the popcorn, which was only grown for personal consumption.

After Richard Kelty retired from the military in the mid-1970s, he obtained a handful of the corn from a relative and planted it on his farm in Urbana, Iowa. Eventually, Kelty and his wife, Rita, annually planted four rows of popcorn behind their house, which later increased to ten rows after their friends and neighbors requested more for their consumption. Kelty then chose to begin selling the popcorn, and founded K&K Popcorn in 1981. Kelty operated the business with his wife.

By 1995, the popcorn operation had grown to include the entire Kelty farm, consisting of 125 acres (51 ha). At that time, the popcorn was available in nearly every U.S. state through mail order, and was also sold in local stores, including Hy-Vee. A toll-free telephone number had also been installed recently to generate interest in the company. Kelty's only marketing effort was to pop his popcorn at grocery stores and give away samples. CBS, as well as several magazines and newspapers, eventually reported about the popcorn; Kelty later said, "I've had people call me and say they've been trying to find out where they can get this popcorn at for two years after they saw one of the stories."

The corn grown by Kelty was never hybridized or genetically modified. Kelty's stalks would reach a height of four to five feet. Each kernel was capable of producing four to six stalks with three to four ears of corn each, unlike field corn. Each ear of corn was grown to be less than three inches long. The characteristics of Kelty's popcorn were created through open pollination, seed selection, and roguing.

=== Mealhow purchase ===
During the 1990s, Gene Mealhow, another eastern Iowa farmer, was working as a soil consultant. Mealhow and his wife, Lynn, had been growing organic crops on their farm since 1989. Gene Mealhow met Kelty in the early 1990s, and they worked together to improve Kelty's popcorn crop. The Mealhows purchased the company on July 1, 1999, allowing Kelty to retire. Kelty said about the Mealhows, "They embrace the concept of having this direct relationship between the customer and the producer that I think is so important for this product." At that time, the company had 130 acres (53 ha) of land for popcorn crops. After the Mealhows purchased the company, they moved its processing equipment from the Kelty farm in Urbana to their own farm north of Shellsburg, Iowa.

The Mealhows began growing the popcorn through an organic method that included farming the biology of the soil. The corn was grown without the use of pesticides. Shortly after the purchase, the Mealhows secured a $40,000 forgivable loan. The loan was secured with help by the Benton Development Group and the Marion Small Business Development Center, and was made through the Value Added Agricultural Products and Processes Financial Assistance Program (VAPPFAP), offered by the Iowa Department of Economic Development. The loan was used to convert a building on the Mealhow farm into an upgraded popcorn-processing facility. The Mealhows also planned to launch a company web site and increase its marketing efforts. Sales increased each month after the Mealhow purchase due to an expanded marketing effort, which was led by the Mealhows' son, Nate. As a result, the company increased to 320 acres (14,000,000 sq ft) to meet demand.

In September 2000, K&K Popcorn received a second $40,000 forgivable loan through VAPPFAP. The second loan was used to finance additional processing equipment and storage space. As a condition of the two loans, the Mealhows were required make it a necessity for local farmers to grow popcorn. Fifteen growers had been contracted to grow popcorn for the company, which had expanded into the organic market. By the end of 2003, the company had 18 contracted popcorn farmers.

By October 2014, Tiny but Mighty Popcorn had eight full-time employees and more than 200 acres (81 ha) in Iowa and Illinois. As of May 2015, the company had 18 employees and an annual profit of $3 million to $5 million, with average yearly sales of 1.6 million pounds of popcorn. Gene Mealhow expected to grow the company within three to five years for anticipated yearly sales of 15 million pounds of popcorn per year.

== Products and availability ==
At the time of the Mealhow purchase, K&K Popcorn was sold through Fareway stores. The Mealhows were initially unsuccessful in convincing Whole Foods Market to carry their product. One store manager in Chicago ultimately agreed to stock the product for a month; the manager contacted the family 10 days later to request additional stock after it sold out. The company's popcorn was eventually carried in every Whole Foods store in Chicago. By 2000, the company's popcorn was advertised as being the world's smallest; Gene Mealhow stated, "The smaller the kernel, the better the flavor."

As of 2002, K&K offered un-popped popcorn in bags ranging from one to five pounds, as well as a 50-pound option. A pre-popped variety was also offered in several flavors. At the time, K&K Popcorn was sold through mail order and was available in each U.S. state. The popcorn was also sold in Hy-Vee stores in seven states. Gene Mealhow stated that the popcorn's "disappearing hull" was appealing to people with digestive problems such as diverticulitis; one of the company's top-selling locations was Florida, which had a high population of older residents. Lynn Mealhow noted that unlike newer varieties of popcorn at that time, the company's heirloom variety did not taste right if popped in a microwave.

In 2003, Market Square Food Company Inc., based in Highland Park, Illinois, began purchasing raw popcorn from K&K Popcorn and popping it. The company would then package the popcorn under the label, "The World's Tiniest Popcorn We Think." Market Square's popcorn went on sale in Iowa in December 2003, and was available in four flavors. Stores also continued to sell K&K's un-popped popcorn, which at that time was made without preservatives, as well as artificial colors and flavors.

As of 2013, the popcorn was available in most Fareway and Hy-Vee stores, as well as approximately 40 Whole Foods stores in the midwestern and eastern United States. A ready-to-eat version of the company's popcorn had also been launched by that time, and a deal had been signed with national distributor KeHE, allowing for access to 30,000 U.S. grocery stores. A microwavable version of the company's popcorn was introduced in October 2014, at which point pre-popped flavored corn was also available, including white cheddar.

Kaitlyn Goalen of Tasting Table wrote that the company's "petite kernels are reinventing our favorite silver-screen snack." In 2014, Evan S. Benn of the Miami Herald stated that Tiny but Mighty Popcorn was his favorite variety of newly emerging heirloom popcorns, writing, "The popcorn has a sweet, nutty flavor, and because the kernels are so small, their hulls disintegrate when popped, so no pesky bits will stick between your teeth."
