= Kettle corn =

Sweet variety of popcorn

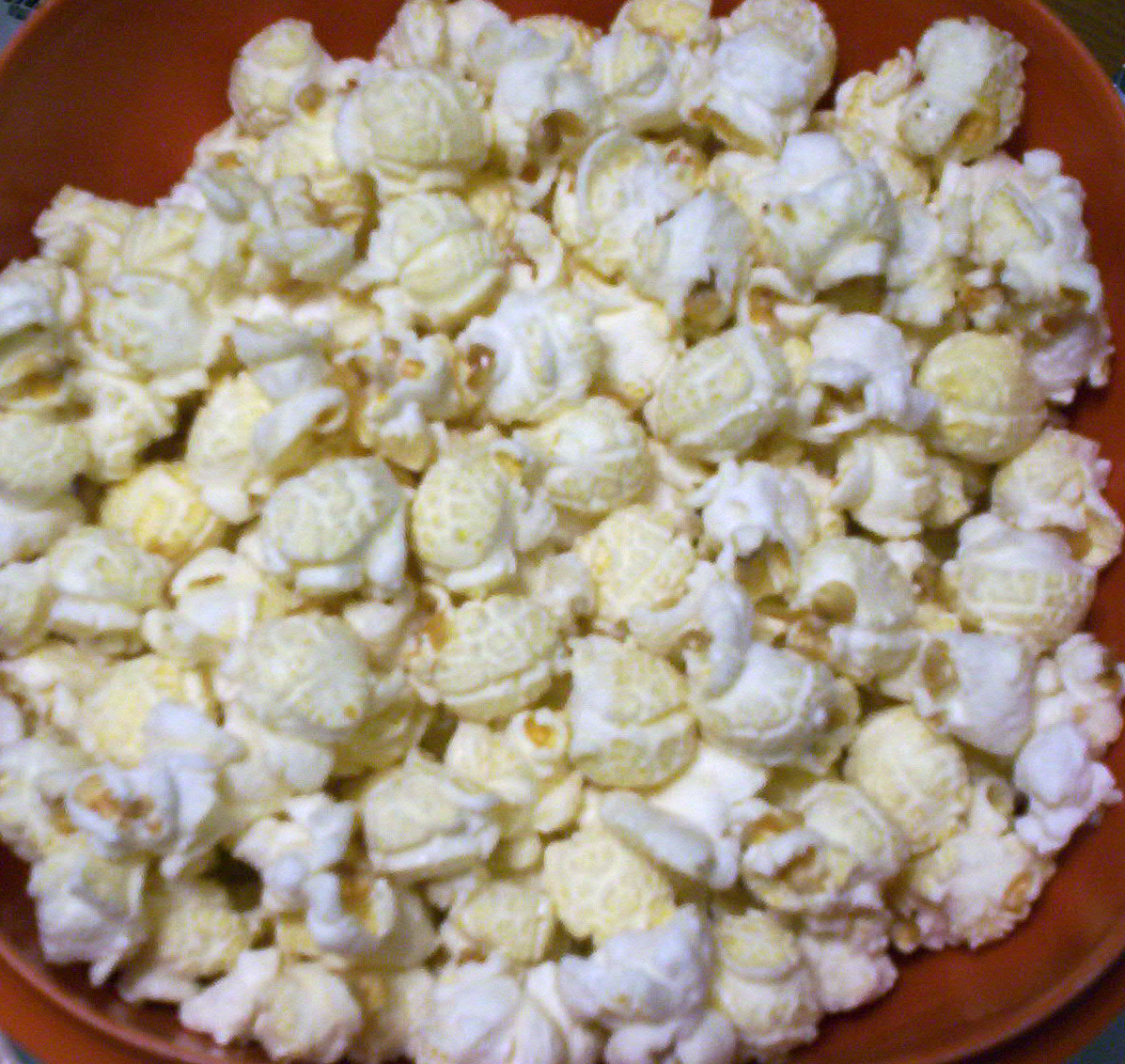
- Unless it is inspected very carefully, the clear coating of sugar on kettle corn is barely visible
- Type: Popcorn
- Place of origin: United States
- Main ingredients: Corn, sugar, salt, oil
- Food energy (per serving): 129 kcal (540 kJ)

Kettle corn being prepared and sold.

Kettle corn is a sweet-and-savory variety of popcorn that is typically mixed or seasoned with a light-colored refined sugar, salt, and oil. It was traditionally made in cast iron kettles, hence the name, but other types of pots and pans are used in modern times.

== History in the United States ==
Kettle corn was introduced to the United States in the 18th century. It is referenced in the diaries of Dutch settlers in Pennsylvania circa 1776.

It was a treat sold at fairs or consumed at other festive occasions. The corn, oil, sugar, and salt are cooked together in a cast-iron kettle, or possibly a Dutch oven. This produces a noticeable sweet crust on the popcorn; however, this method requires constant stirring or the sugar will burn. Alternatively, a batch of plain popped corn can be sweetened with sugar or honey before adding salt. This combination was widely popular in the early 19th century but fell from wide usage during the 20th century.

In the early 21st century, kettle corn made a comeback in America, especially at 19th-century living history events. It is cooked and sold at fairs and flea markets throughout the United States, especially art and craft shows. Although modern kettle corn is commonly cooked in stainless steel or copper kettles because of their lighter weight, cast-iron cauldrons are still used to publicly cook the corn and mix the ingredients to retain the original flavor. Recipes for homemade kettle corn are available, and microwave popcorn versions are sold.

Flavored kettle corn comes in flavors such as "garlic-maple-pepper", jalapeño, and maple.

== See also ==
- Caramel corn, the popcorn with a darker, thicker, richer tasting candy shell, made with caramelized sugar.
