= Acetylpropionyl =

Names
- Preferred IUPAC name Pentane-2,3-dione
- Other names 2,3-Pentanedione

Identifiers
CAS Number	600-14-6
3D model (JSmol)	Interactive image
ChemSpider	11254
ECHA InfoCard	100.009.078
PubChem CID	11747
UNII	K4WBE45SCM
CompTox Dashboard (EPA)	DTXSID6051435
- InChI: InChI=1S/C5H8O2/c1-3-5(7)4(2)6/h3H2,1-2H3 Key: TZMFJUDUGYTVRY-UHFFFAOYSA-N; InChI=1/C5H8O2/c1-3-5(7)4(2)6/h3H2,1-2H3 Key: TZMFJUDUGYTVRY-UHFFFAOYAL
- SMILES: CCC(=O)C(=O)C

Properties
Chemical formula	C_{5}H_{8}O_{2}
Molar mass	100.117 g·mol^{−1}
- Except where otherwise noted, data are given for materials in their standard state (at 25 °C [77 °F], 100 kPa). Infobox references

Acetylpropionyl, also known as acetyl propionyl or 2,3-pentanedione, is an organic compound, specifically a diketone.

Uses for acetylpropionyl include as a:

- Solvent for cellulose acetate, paints, inks, and lacquers
- Starting material for dyes, pesticides, and drugs
- Flavor, with an odor described as "buttery, cheesy, sweet, nutty, fruity, creamy, caramel"

Food production facilities use acetylpropionyl in foods such as cookies, coffee, cereal, and chocolate. It is also found in nicotine containing liquids for vaping, and in flavored cigarettes. It is often used as a flavoring substitute for diacetyl, but may share similar human pulmonary toxicity.

== Safety ==
As a flavoring agent, it is an ingredient in some e-liquid products for use with electronic cigarettes to give a buttery or caramel flavor. There is substantial evidence of the pulmonary toxicity of acetylpropionyl in animals. Rats exposed to acetylpropionyl develop both fibrosis and necrosis of the respiratory tract. Mice exposed to acetylpropionyl demonstrate more bronchial constriction in response to methacholine challenge. It is also known to cause genetic changes in animal brains.

Acetylpropionyl has been used as a substitute for the toxic flavoring chemical diacetyl. However, in one flavoring manufacturing facility that substituted diacetyl for acetylpropionyl, abnormal lung function values were associated with total time spent in production areas. An investigation by NIOSH in 2009 at a facility that used buttermilk flavoring containing acetylpropionyl demonstrated that workers had higher than average reports of shortness of breath, asthma, and restrictive type spirometry defects. Another investigation by NIOSH in 2013 at a flavoring manufacturer that used acetylpropionyl revealed that those workers who spent the most time working with flavoring chemicals, including acetylpropionyl, were more likely to have abnormal lung function as detected by pulmonary function tests.

== See also ==
- Diacetyl, a similar diketone
- Acetoin
