= Orville Redenbacher's =

American brand of popcorn

- Product type: Popcorn
- Current owner: Conagra Brands
- Country: United States
- Introduced: 1969; 57 years ago
- Markets: Worldwide
- Previous owners: Charles F. Bowman; Orville Redenbacher; Hunt-Wesson, Inc. Beatrice Foods

Orville Redenbacher's is an American brand of popcorn made originally by Chester Inc.

The brand was launched to the public in 1969, and was sold to Hunt-Wesson, a division of Norton Simon Inc. in 1976. In 1983, Esmark purchased Norton Simon, and the next year (1984), Beatrice Foods acquired Esmark. In 1985, Kohlberg Kravis Roberts acquired Beatrice with the goal of selling off businesses. The popcorn business and other old Hunt-Wesson businesses were sold in 1990 to agribusiness giant Conagra Brands.

Chester, the corporation that launched the Orville Redenbacher's brand, was owned by Charles F. Bowman and Orville Redenbacher. Redenbacher starred in nearly all the brand's commercials until his death in 1995.

== See also ==
- List of popcorn brands
