= Act II (popcorn) =

Brand of microwavable popcorn

ACT II
- Product type: Microwave popcorn
- Current owner: Conagra Brands
- Country: United States
- Introduced: 1981; 45 years ago
- Markets: Worldwide
- Previous owners: Golden Valley Microwave Foods
- Website: www.actii.com

Act II (simply Act) is an American brand of microwave popcorn that is based on the look and taste of movie theater popcorn. It is currently made and distributed by Conagra Brands. Act II was preceded in the popcorn market by Act I (popcorn in theaters), an early microwave popcorn that had to be stored in the refrigerator due to its real butter content. The bag itself featured a built in susceptor, a thin metallized layer designed to absorb microwave energy and convert it into heat. This allowed the bottom of the bag to reach high temperatures (reaching up to 300°F) heating the oil and pop the kernels left at the bottom of the bag.

== Overview ==
Act I was introduced in 1981. In 1984, Act II, a shelf-stable microwave popcorn was released, becoming the first mass-marketed microwave popcorn. The popcorn bag used in Act II was invented by James Watkins, a former engineer for the Pillsbury Company in Minneapolis, Minnesota, and then Founder/President of Golden Valley Microwave Foods.

== Manufacturing ==
Act II was manufactured by the Golden Valley Microwave Foods (frequently abbreviated as GVMF on the packaging) company of Edina, Minnesota. GVMF was later bought by ConAgra Foods in 1991.

The Edina facility was closed and manufacturing moved to other manufacturing plants in the US and Mexico.

== See also ==
- List of popcorn brands
