= Caramel corn =

Popcorn coated with caramel

Caramel corn, caramel popcorn
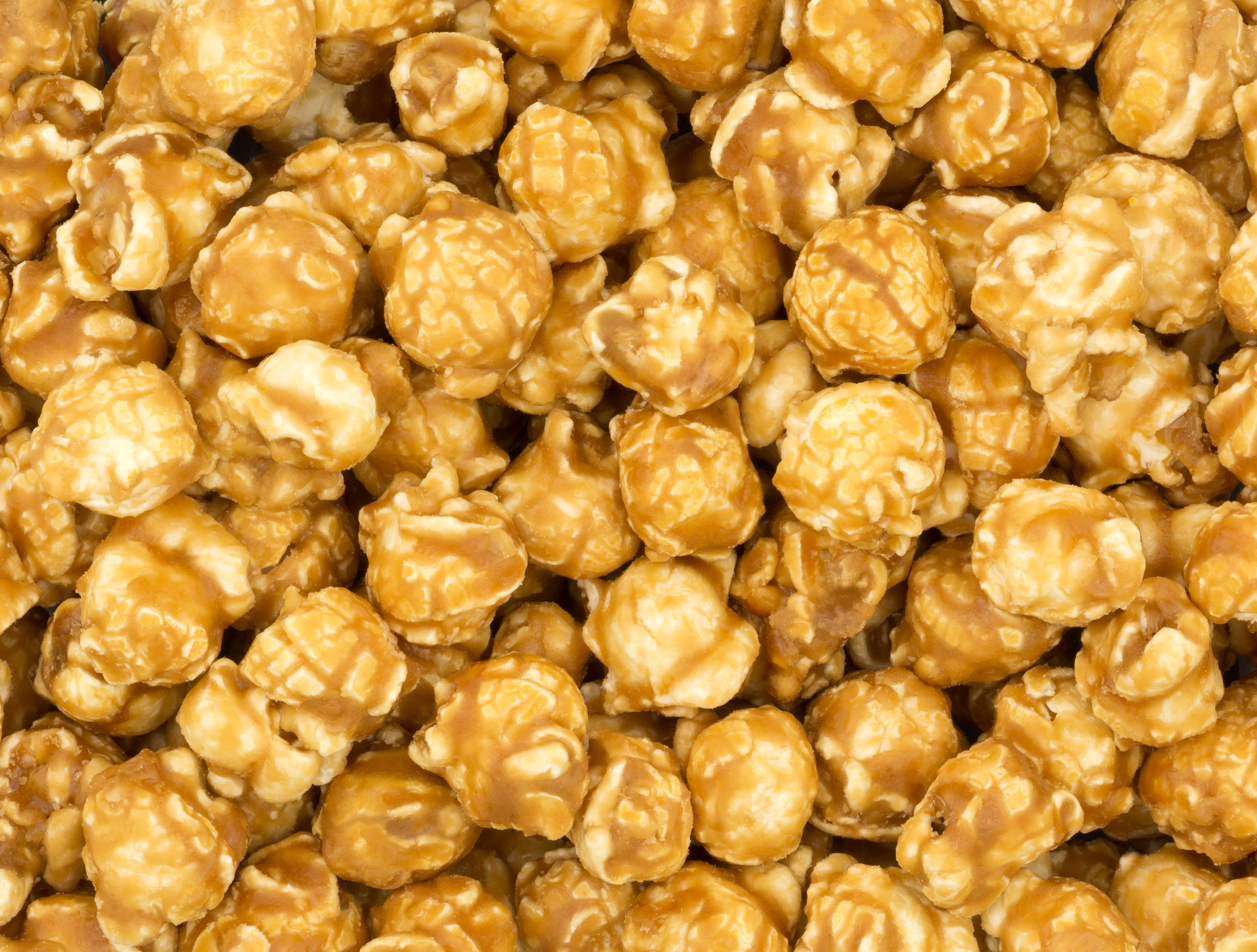
- Caramel corn
- Type: Confectionery
- Place of origin: United States
- Region or state: Chicago, Illinois
- Main ingredients: Popcorn, caramel (based on sugar or molasses)

Caramel corn or caramel popcorn (toffee popcorn in the UK) is a confection made of popcorn coated with a sugar or molasses-based caramel candy shell that is normally less than 1 mm thick. Typically a sugar solution or syrup is made and heated until it browns and becomes thick, producing a caramelized candy syrup. This hot candy is then mixed with popped popcorn, and allowed to cool. Sometimes, a candy thermometer is used, as making caramel is time-consuming and requires skill to make well without burning the sugar. The process creates a sweet flavored, crunchy snack food or treat. After coating with the candy syrup, some varieties are baked in an oven to crisp the mixture. Mixes sometimes contain nuts, such as peanuts, pecans, almonds, or cashews.

== History ==
The combination of caramel and corn dates back at least as far as the 1890s with the strong molasses flavor of Cracker Jack, an early version of which was introduced at the Chicago World's Fair in 1893. The lighter, sweet but un-caramelized kettle corn, may be a North American colonial predecessor to caramel corn.

There are many commercial brands and forms of caramel corn available, such as Cracker Jack, Fiddle Faddle, Lolly Gobble Bliss Bombs, and Crunch 'n Munch. In grocery stores, at cinemas, and convenience stores, pre-bagged caramel corn made locally may also be sold.

== Regulation ==
Candy-coated popcorn is defined in US law as a food of minimal nutritional value.

== See also ==
- Cretors, the Chicago company who invented the first commercial popcorn machine
- Kettle corn, the sweetened popcorn with a lighter, thinner (in both flavor and color) sweet coating
