= Microwave popcorn =

Type of convenience food

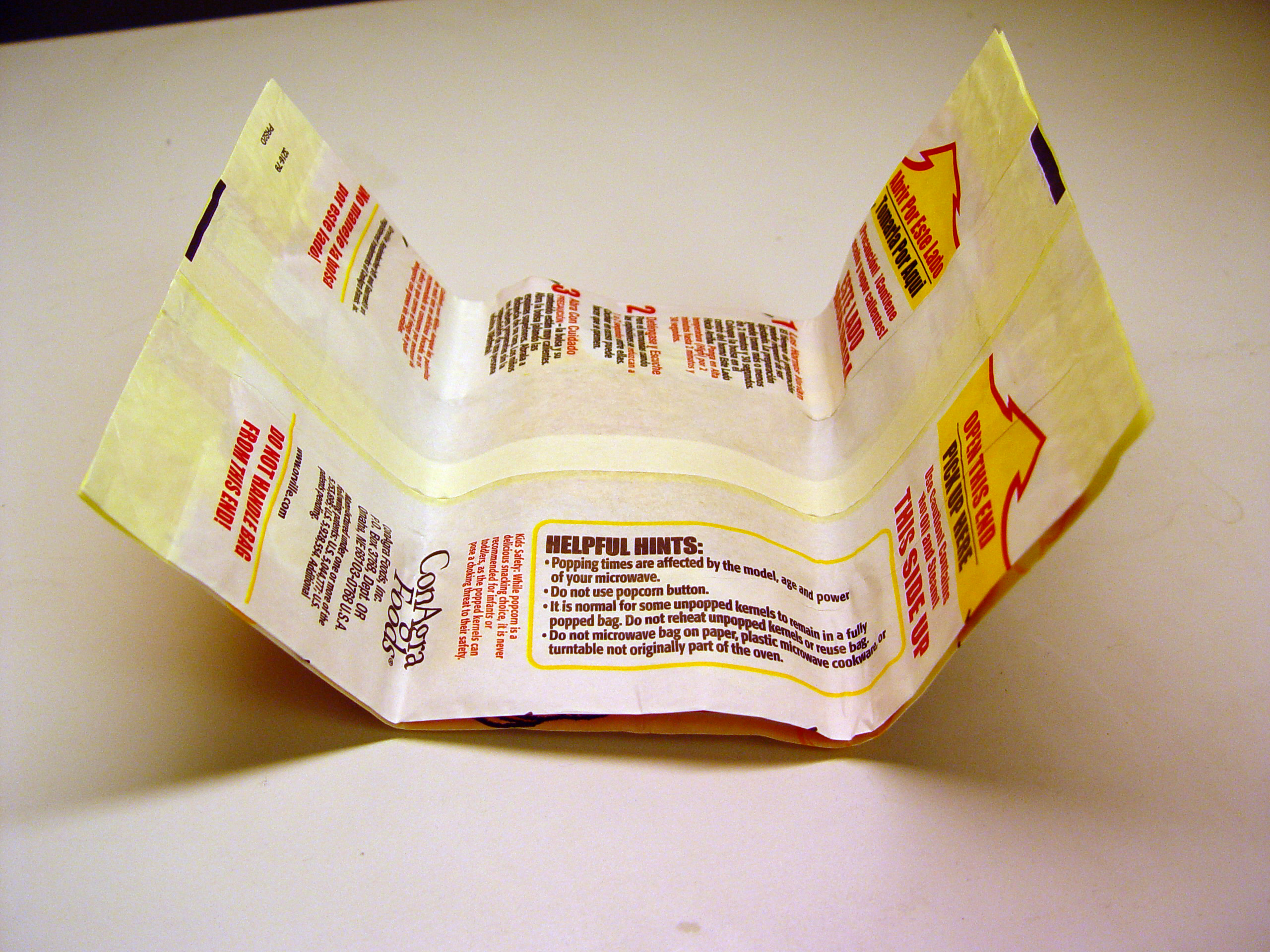
Microwave popcorn bag from ConAgra, unpopped state

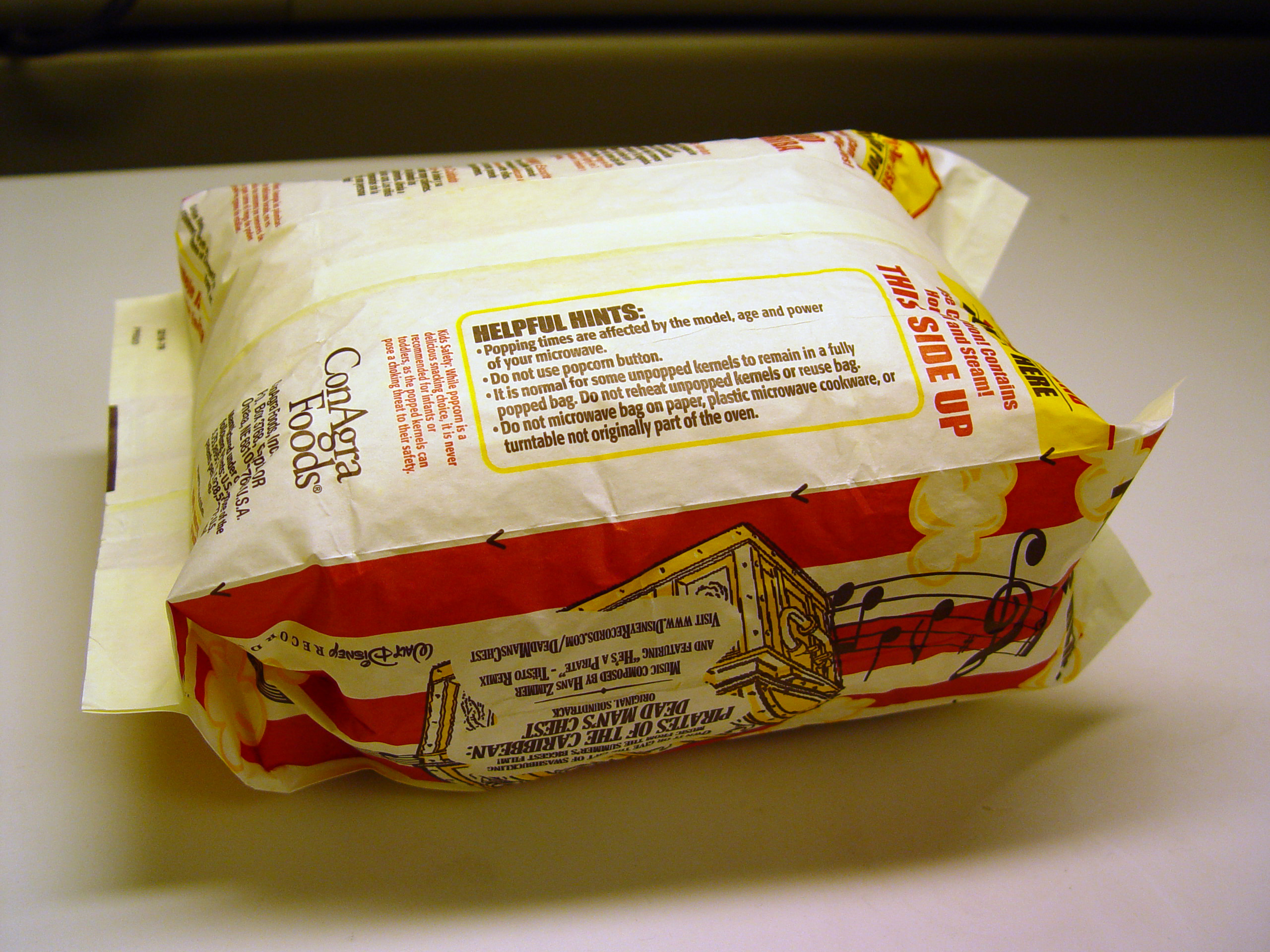
Microwave popcorn bag, popped state

Microwave popcorn is a convenience food consisting of unpopped popcorn in an enhanced, sealed paper bag intended to be heated in a microwave oven. In addition to the dried corn, the bags typically contain cooking oil with sufficient saturated fat to solidify at room temperature, one or more seasonings (often salt), and natural or artificial flavorings or both.

== Design ==
The bag is typically partially folded when it is placed in a microwave, and inflates as a result of steam pressure from the heated kernels.

Microwave popcorn bags are designed to avoid popped-kernel scorching, an undesirable effect that takes place when popped kernels are heated above 300 °F (150 °C). A susceptor—usually a metalized film laminated onto the paper of the bag—absorbs microwaves and concentrates heat at the film interface, thus ensuring a heat distribution focused on the hard-to-heat flavor coating so that the unpopped kernels are evenly coated prior to popping, thereby ensuring even flavor throughout the product.

Some popcorn is flawed and will not pop because of possible damage to the shell, which allows the steam to escape. These unpopped kernels are known as "old men" or "grandpas".

An early susceptor popcorn bag design was patented by the American company General Mills in 1981 (US Patent #4,267,420).

== History ==
The first use of microwaves to pop corn kernels was when Raytheon engineer Percy Spencer further tested his observation of a chocolate candy bar melting in his pocket while working with radar tubes during WWII. Later on, Spencer did create a method in popping popcorn without removing the corn kernels from the cob, however, it didn't catch on. In 1978 was when the earliest microwave popcorn bag was first patented. Three years later, in 1981, the first microwave popcorn was released

== Safety issues ==
Care in package design is needed for food safety.

A safety issue is that the cooking time given on the packaging does not apply to all microwave ovens. Setting the timer and coming back later, after the timer's alarm has sounded, could result in the popcorn being burnt and smoking badly. Microwave popcorn makers suggest that the person cooking the popcorn stay near the oven to observe the popcorn as it cooks, and take the popcorn out when the time between pops is more than a few seconds.

Some microwave ovens have a specific mode designed for cooking popcorn, which either uses factory-calibrated time and power level settings, or which uses humidity or sound sensors to detect when popping has finished.

The concern about microwave popcorn bags has increased in terms of the waste and their harmful impacts on the environment. The coating materials used in microwave popcorn bags can have negative effects on the environment. Researchers have detected toxic chemicals in the bags, such as perfluorinated compounds (PFCs) and their potential precursors.

=== Harmful chemicals ===
Researchers have detected many PFCs in microwave popcorn bags used as coating materials for oil and moisture resistance. The amount of PFOA in some microwave popcorn bags is determined as high as 300 μg kg^{−1}. Besides PFOA and PFOS, Moral et al. also determined other perfluorocarboxylic acids (PFCAs) in popcorn packaging, including perfluoroheptanoic (PFHpA), perfluorononanoic (PFNA), perfluorodecanoic (PFDA), perfluoroundecanoic (PFUnA), and perfluorododecanoic (PFDoA) acids.

Due to the toxicity of PFOA, major U.S. manufacturers volunteered to phase out production of PFOA by the end of 2015. In addition, the use of perfluoroalkyl ethyl-containing food-contact substances are no longer allowed by the U.S Food and Drug Administration (FDA) regulations in January 2016. However, although the production of PFOA and PFOS was reduced, the production of fluorotelomer-based chemicals applied to food contact papers is still increasing. Some compounds, such as polyfluoroalkyl phosphate surfactants (PAPs) or fluorotelomers (FTOH), have been used in some brands of microwave popcorn bags. Those compounds are precursors of PFCAs, and evidence shows that they are more toxic than PFCAs themselves. Furthermore, they may also be degraded to PFCAs, and therefore leading to the increase of PFCAs concentrations in the environment and generating adverse effects.

=== Environmental impacts ===
Because of the large amount of production of microwave popcorn bags, they have also become a significant contaminant source (PFCs) to the environment. Due to the disposal of coated paper and manufacturing activities, PFOA has also been detected in wastewater and biosolids. Soil near disposal sites are contaminated by PFOA as well.

== See also ==
- Kettle corn
- List of popcorn brands
- Popcorn maker
- Pop Secret
