= List of brand name food products =

This article is a list of notable brand name food products that are presently produced as well as discontinued or defunct, organized by the type of product. This list also includes brand-name beverage mix products.

== Baked goods ==
- Back to Nature (Mondelez International)
- Bimbo
- Bond Bread
- Bost's Bread
- Burry's
- Dave's Killer Bread
- Davidovich Bagels
- Entenmann's
- Holsum Bread
- Home Pride
- Hovis
- King's Hawaiian
- Kits
- Lender's Bagels
- McVitie's
- Merita Breads
- Mother's Pride
- Nabisco
- Nature's Own
- Newman's Own
- Pepperidge Farm
- Polarbröd
- Roman Meal
- Sunbeam Bread
- Tastykake
- Thomas'
- Warburtons
- Westminster Cracker Company
- Wonder Bread

=== Baking mixes ===
- Arrowhead Mills
- Atkins Nutritionals
- Aunt Jemima (rebranded to Pearl Milling Company)
- Betty Crocker
- Bisquick
- Bob's Red Mill
- Boulder Brands
- Cherrybrook Kitchen
- Dassant
- Jack & Jason's Pancakes & Waffles
- Jiffy mix
- King Arthur Baking
- Kodiak Cakes
- Krusteaz
- Martha White
- Mrs. Butterworth's
- Dr. Oetker
- Pillsbury
- Ralcorp
- Streit's

== Beverages ==
- Akta-Vite
- Almdudler
- Alpro – soy milk
- Apple Sidra
- Artos (drink)
- Asia (soft drink brand)
- Banana Flavored Milk
- Banania
- Barleycup
- Baron von Lemon
- Boga (soft drink)
- Bournvita
- Bovril
- Carnation – evaporated milk, instant breakfast
- Caro (drink)
- Capri-Sun
- Clamato
- Clipper Teas
- Club-Mate
- Cocio
- Cool Mountain Beverages
- Cravendale
- Crystal Light
- Danone
- Double Seven (soft drink)
- El Namroud
- Energen (cereal drink)
- Frugo
- Gold Spot
- Goombay Punch
- Höpt
- Horlicks
- Jūrokucha
- Juven
- Kalleh Dairy
- Killer Shake
- Kinnie
- Kinohimitsu
- Maltos-Cannabis
- Manhattan Special
- Maxwell House International
- Mercy (drink)
- Nestlé Milo
- MiO
- Mirinda
- Mr Sherick's Shakes
- Nescafé
- Nespresso
- Nesquik
- Nestea
- Nestlé
- Nexcite
- Ovaltine
- PDQ Chocolate
- PJ's Smoothies
- Pog
- POM Wonderful
- Postum
- Silk
- Sinalco
- Swiss Miss – hot chocolate
- Vitamalt
- Vitamin Water
- Wander AG
- Welch's
- Wyler's
- Yop
- Zarex (drink)
- Zest-O

=== Nutritional drinks ===
- Ensure
- Horlicks

== Biscuits ==
- Abbey Crunch
- Aero Biscuits
- Afghan (biscuit)
- Afternoon Tea (biscuits)
- Arnott
- Biscuit rose de Reims
- Biscuits Fossier
- Blue Riband
- BN (biscuit)
- Breakaway (biscuit)
- Britannia Biscuits
- Burton's
- Cadbury Caramel Crunch
- Cadbury Fingers
- Cadbury Snack
- Cadbury Snaps
- Cameo Creme
- Carr's
- CBL Munchee Bangladesh
- Ceylon Biscuits Limited
- Cheddars
- Chips Ahoy!
- Club (biscuit)
- Club Milk
- DeMet's Candy Company
- Domino (cookie)
- Drifter (chocolate bar)
- Famous Amos
- Kinder
- Filipinos (snack food)
- Fox's Biscuits
- Galletas Fontaneda
- Galletas Gullón
- Gold (biscuit)
- Happy Faces
- Hello Panda
- Hobnob biscuit
- HobNob
- Hovis biscuit
- Hula Hoops
- Huntley & Palmers
- Iced VoVo
- Jacob's
- Jaffa Cakes
- Jammie Dodgers
- Kägi Söhne
- Kambly
- Kingston (biscuit)
- Kit Kat
- Kits
- KP Snacks
- Krispie
- Leibniz-Keks
- Loacker
- Lotus Bakeries
- LU (biscuits)
- Maliban
- McCoy's (crisp)
- McVitie's
- Meanie (snack)
- Monte Carlo (biscuit)
- Neapolitan wafer
- Newman's Own
- Nik Naks (British snack)
- Oreo
- Parle-G
- Peek Freans
- Penguin (biscuit)
- Pirouline
- Plasmon biscuit
- Quadratini
- Quely
- Rebisco
- Skips (snack)
- Space Raiders (snack food)
- Sunshine Biscuits (Australia)
- Taxi
- Tim Tam (biscuit)
- Tiny Teddy
- Tracker
- Trio (chocolate bar)
- Tunnock's wafer
- Tunnock's
- Twiglets
- Twix
- United Biscuits
- Vienna Fingers
- Wagon Wheels
- Waitrose Duchy Organic
- Walkers Shortbread
- Wheat Crunchies
- Wright's Biscuits

=== Crackers and other savoury biscuits ===
- Club (Keebler)
- Jacobs Cream Crackers
- Ritz
- Ry-Krisp
- Triscuit
- Wheat Thins

=== Energy bars ===
- Balance Bar
- CalorieMate
- Clif Bar
- Lärabar
- LUNA Bar
- PowerBar
- Rxbar
- Soldier Fuel
- Tiger's Milk

== Breakfast foods ==
- Cream of Wheat
- Malt-O-Meal
- Maypo – oatmeal
- McCann's Steel Cut Irish Oatmeal
- Quaker Oats Company
  - Quaker Instant Oatmeal
- Scott's Porage Oats

== Cakes ==
- Barny Cakes
- Baskin-Robbins
- Betty Crocker
- Bumpy cake
- Cadbury Cake Bars
- Cadbury Highlights
- Chocodile Twinkie
- Drake's Cakes
- Dunkin' Donuts
- Hostess CupCake
- Ho Hos
- Hostess (snack cakes)
- Krispy Kreme
- Mars Muffin (McVitie's)
- McVitie's
- Mr Kipling
- Secret Recipe
- Suzy Q
- Twinkie
- Viennetta
- Yodels
- Zingers

== Canned (tinned) foods ==
- Ayam Brand
- Bush's Baked Beans
- Century Tuna
- Chef Boyardee
- Chicken of the Sea
- Contadina – owned by Del Monte Foods
- Crosse & Blackwell
- Del Monte Foods
- Fray Bentos
- Gerber Singles
- Grandma Brown's Baked Beans
- Green Giant
- Greenseas
- Heinz baked beans
- Hunt's
- Libby's
- Manwich
- Prem (food)
- Ro-Tel
- Spam
- StarKist
- Treet
- Van Camp's
- Wolf Brand Chili

== Chips, crisps, corn snacks, nuts and seeds ==
- Adyar Ananda Bhavan
- Andy Capp's fries
- Barcel
- Brannigans
- Bugles (General Mills)
- Cape Cod Potato Chips
- Cheetos
- Cheez Doodles
- Cheez-It
- Cheezies
- CornNuts
- David Sunflower Seeds
- Doritos
- Frito-Lay
- Fritos
- Golden Wonder (Tayto Group)
- Hula Hoops (KP Snacks)
- Kettle Foods
- KP Nuts (KP Snacks)
- Kurkure
- Lay's Stax (Frito-Lay)
- McCoys Crisps
- Monster Munch – corn snack
- Munchos
- Nobby's Nuts
- Phileas Fogg
- Pirate's Booty
- Pringles (Kellogg Company)
- Ringos (Golden Wonder)
- Ruffles
- San Nicasio
- Space Raiders (KP Snacks)
- Sun Chips
- Smith's Crisps
- The Smith's Snackfood Company
- Tudor Crisps
- Twiglets (United Biscuits)
- Twisties
- Tyrrells
- Tyrrells Apple Chips
- Walkers Crisps (Walkers)
- Wheat Crunchies
- Wise Foods
- Wotsits (Walkers)

== Condiments ==
- Ajinomoto
- Hellmann's and Best Foods
- Dennis' Horseradish

== Dairy products ==
- Alaska
- Almarai
- Alpura
- Alquería
- Amul
- Anchor
- Arla
- Borden
- Broughton Foods Company
- Chivers
- Colun
- Conaprole
- Dutch Lady
- Dutch Mill
- Eagle Brand
- Garelick Farms
- Horizon Organic
- Iran Dairy Industries Co.
- La Serenísima
- Lala
- Louis Trauth Dairy
- Magnolia
- Mayfield Dairy
- Meadow Gold Dairies (Hawaii)
- Nestlé
- Organic Valley
- Purity Dairies
- Reddi-Wip
- Selecta
- Soprole
- T. G. Lee Dairy
- Tuscan Dairy Farms
- Vigor

=== Cheeses and cheese foods ===
- Alpine Lace
- Borden
- Cheez Whiz
- Easy Cheese
- Eden
- Gossner Foods
- Kraft
- Palmetto Cheese
- Sargento
- Velveeta

== Egg products ==
- Egg Beaters

== Export/wholesale/catering trade ==
- Moorhouse's

== Frozen foods ==
- Banquet
- Birds Eye
- Findus
- Freezer Queen
- FRoSTA
- Jus-Rol
- Marie Callender's
- Stouffer's
- Tombstone (pizza)
- XLNT Foods

=== Ice cream and frozen desserts ===
- Ambrosia
- Angel Delight
- Ben & Jerry's
- Bird's Custard
- Bounty ice cream
- Eskimo
- Gü
- Häagen-Dazs
- Keventers Milkshake
- Magnolia
- Magnum
- Müller Rice
- Selecta
- Solero
- Wall's (see Unilever Heartbrand)
  - Walls Cornetto
  - Walls Vienetta

== Meats ==
- Argentina
- Armour
- Butterball
- Campofrío
- CDO
- Columbus Craft Meats
- Frank 'n Stuff
- Gorton's of Gloucester
- Gwaltney
- Hebrew National
- Hormel
- Jennie-O – turkey products
- Jimmy Dean
- Libby's
- Maple Leaf
- Omaha Steaks
- Oscar Mayer
- Spam
- Wall's sausages

== Oils, butters and fat spreads ==
- Becel
- Bertolli
- Blue Bonnet
- Country Crock
- Crisco
- Flora
- I Can't Believe It's Not Butter!
- Lambda
- Land O'Lakes
- PAM
- Parkay
- Rafhan
- Sana
- Spry Vegetable Shortening
- Stork
- Wesson cooking oil

== Pickles and vinegar ==
- Branston
- Crosse & Blackwell
  - Sarson's
- Datu Puti
- Haywards
- Maille
- Mt. Olive
- Vlasic Pickles

== Prepared/ready-made meals and foods ==
- Buddy Fruits
- Buitoni
- Candwich
- Conimex
- Continental
- DiGiorno
- Findus
- Gardein
- Gardenburger
- Gerber
- Healthy Choice
- Herta Foods – a brand of pre-cooked Frankfurters owned by Nestlé
- Heinz
- Hunt's Snack Pack – pudding
- Kozy Shack – pudding
- La Choy
- Lean Cuisine
- Mrs. Grass
- Swanson
- Swiss Miss – pudding
- Weight Watchers
- Yoplait

== Sauces ==
- Beerenberg Farm (Australia)
- Chicken Tonight
- Hayward's
- Loyd Grossman sauces
- Prego
- Ragú

== Seafood ==
- Ayam Brand

== Snack foods ==
- Peperami – pork sausage snack
- Planters nuts
- Pocky
- Slim Jim
- Space Food Sticks

=== Popcorn ===
- Act II
- Jiffy Pop
- Orville Redenbacher's
- Smartfood

==== Candied popcorn ====
- Cracker Jack
- Crunch 'n Munch
- Fiddle Faddle
- Poppycock
- Screaming Yellow Zonkers

== Soup and noodles ==
- Batchelor's Super Noodles
- Campbells
- Continental
- Cup-a-Soup
- Cup Noodles
- Hamburger Helper
- Heinz
- Indomie
- Koka (brand)
- Knorr
- Kraft Dinner
- Lucky Me!
- Maggi
- Mie Sedaap
- Mrs. Grass
- Nissin
- Nongshim
- Ottogi
- Pot Noodle and derivatives like Pot Rice
- Progresso
- Samyang
- Sapporo Ichiban
- Sarimi
- Science Noodles
- Super Noodles
- Wyler's

== Soy foods ==
- Alpro – soy yogurt
- Eden Foods Inc.

== Spreads, jams and honeys ==
- Gale's (honey, lemon curd)
- Hartley's (jam)
- Rafhan
- Tiptree (jam, marmalade, sauce, chutney, mustard, honey, lemon curd, Christmas pudding)
- Welch's

=== Nut butters ===
- Jif
- Nutella
- Peter Pan
- Skippy
- Squirrel
- Sun-Pat

== Yeast ==
- Fleischmann's Yeast

== Miscellaneous ==
- Amy's Kitchen
- Bernard Matthews
- Birds
- Carbolite
- China Doll
- Fleischmann's Yeast
- General Mills
- Ginsters
- Harina P.A.N.
- Jel Sert
- Minute Rice
- Mrs. Wagner's Pies
- Quorn
- ReaLemon
- Slim Fast
- Smash
- Square Pie
- Wall's – sausages and pies

== See also ==
- List of brand name breads
- List of brand name condiments
  - List of mustard brands
- List of brand name snack foods
- List of Conagra brands
- List of food companies
- List of frozen food brands
- List of Japanese snacks
