= Beerenberg (disambiguation) =

Beerenberg (Dutch: "Bear mountain") may refer to

- Beerenberg, a stratovolcano on Jan Mayen, Norway
- Beerenberg (Sauerland), a mountain in Sauerland, Germany
- Beerenberg (Winterthur), a hill in Winterthur, Switzerland
- Beerenberg Abbey, an abbey in Winterthur, Switzerland
- Beerenberg Corp (Norwegian company), formerly Dalseide & Fløysand, a Norwegian technical service company
- Beerenberg Farm, an Australian producer of jams, condiments, sauces and dressings

== See also ==
- Berenberg (disambiguation)
- Berenberg Bank, a German bank
