= Suso =

Suso or Susso may refer to:

== People ==
=== Nickname or given name ===
- Suso (footballer) (Jesús Joaquín Fernández Sáenz de la Torre) (born 1993), Spanish professional footballer
- Suso Santana (born 1985), nicknamed Suso, Spanish footballer
- Suso Cecchi d'Amico (1914–2010), Italian screenwriter
- Suso Díaz (1944–2025), Spanish trade unionist
- Suso de Toro (born 1956), Spanish writer

=== Surname ===
- Foday Musa Suso, Gambian griot and kora musician
- Jali Nyama Suso (1925–1991), Gambian kora musician
- Papa Susso, Gambian kora musician
- Henry Suso (1295–1366), German mystic
- Sima Suso (born 2005), German footballer

== Acronyms of orchestras ==
- Stockholm Youth Symphony Orchestra (Swedish: Stockholms ungdoms symfoniorkester)
- Sydney University Symphony Orchestra

== Other uses ==
- Suso (drink), carbonated fruit juice drink
- The Susso, an Australian slang term referring to "sustenance" (welfare) payments
