= Club Orange =

Club Orange may refer to:

- A flavor of Club (soft drink)
- A flavor of Club (biscuit)
