= Alqueria (disambiguation) =

Alqueria or Alcaria may refer to:

- Alqueria, type of Muslim village in Southern Spain
- L'Alqueria de la Comtessa/Alquería de la Condesa, Valencia, Spain
- L'Alqueria d'Asnar/Alquería de Aznar, Alicante, Spain
- Alquería (company), a Colombian dairy company
