= Artos (disambiguation) =

An artos is a loaf of bread used in Eastern Orthodox and Byzantine rite catholic church services.

Artos may also refer to:

- Mount Artos, Turkey
- Artos (drink), an Indian soft drink
- Rudi "Artos" Mackenzie, a major character in the Emberverse science fiction universe
