= Vue West End =

Cinema in Westminster, London, England

Coordinates: 51°30′41″N 0°7′46″W

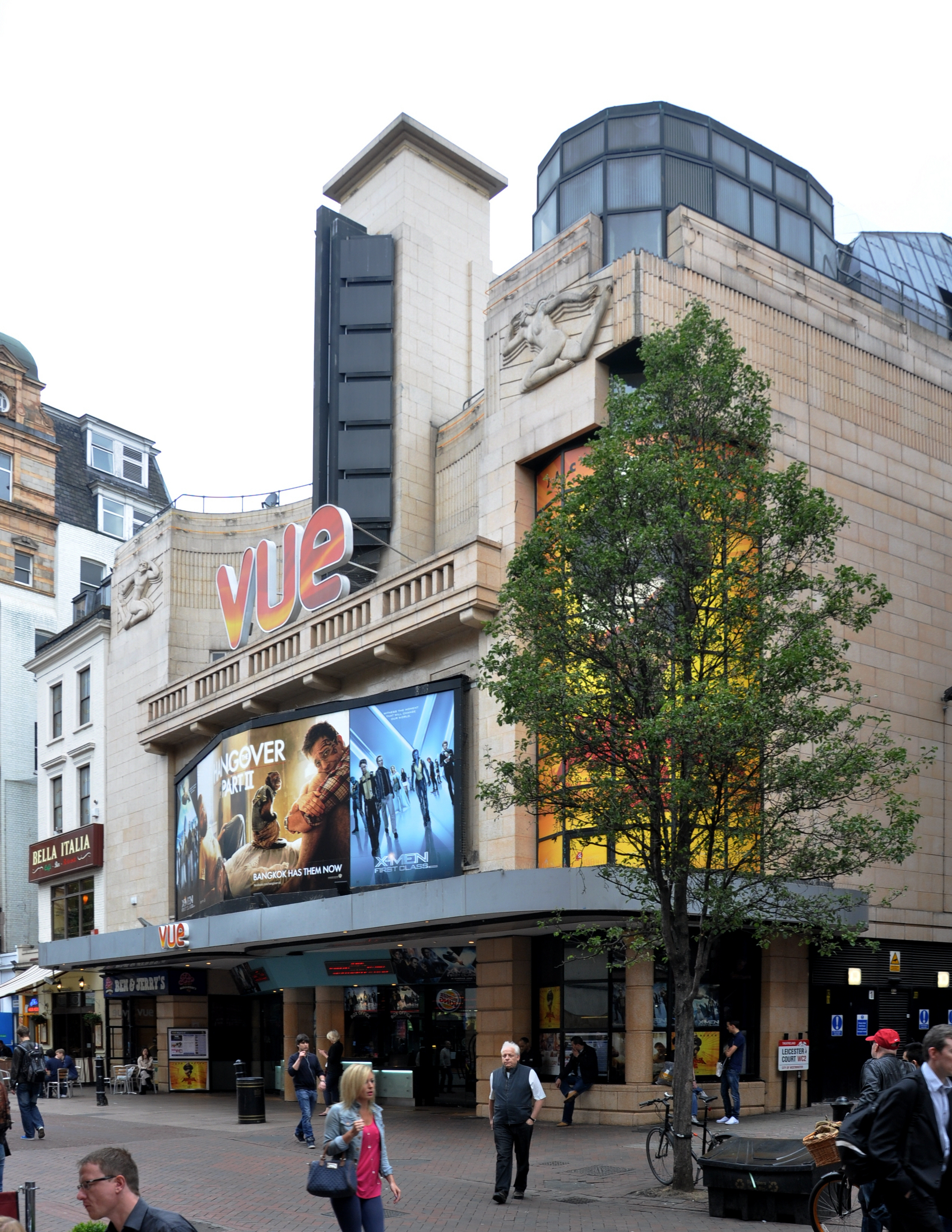
Vue West End

Vue West End is a nine-screen cinema complex in Leicester Square, London, operated by Vue Cinemas. The multiplex was constructed in 1993 on the site of what was previously the Warner West End cinema.

== History ==
The site was previously occupied by Daly's Theatre, which opened on 27 June 1893; following acquisition by Warner Brothers, this was demolished in 1937, to build a new 1,789-seat cinema. Known as the Warner Theatre, its architects were Thomas Somerford and Edward Stone, and it featured a facade of reconstructed marble panels, with large relief panels in each top corner by Bainbridge Copnall depicting the spirits of sight and sound.

Its single auditorium was a 2 level design, with a circle balcony, and its sidewalls were fitted with asbestos panels, perforated with large holes, over acoustic absorption. The stage at Daly's Theatre occupied almost as much space as the seating area but the new building was almost entirely devoted to seats. The cinema featured designs never before incorporated into a UK cinema such as the screen design, lighting and the walls quilted with mahogany and fawn to give the maximum in acoustic results. It opened on 12 October 1938 showing The Adventures of Robin Hood starring Errol Flynn.

The cinema was refurbished in 1964. In 1970, the original auditorium was subdivided at a cost of $1.5 million to form 2 screens, known as the Warner West End (with 800 seats) and the Rendezvous Warner West End (with 700 seats). The Warner West End opened 29 October 1970 with the British premiere of There Was a Crooked Man... starring Kirk Douglas and Henry Fonda, and the Rendezvous opened 12 November with the world premiere of The Rise and Rise of Michael Rimmer. A third auditorium, built in the former bar area, was added in 1974, with the screens now numbered 1–3. In 1975 Screen 2 was subdivided into 2 auditoria, and a 5th auditorium was added in 1981. The whole complex became known as the Warner West End.

Due to asbestos, no further refurbishments could take place and the cinema closed on 12 September 1991 and the 1938 building was almost entirely demolished, but with the retention of, in particular, most of the front facade. A new nine screen multiplex over five floors was constructed at a cost of £11 million having a total capacity of 2,482. The largest auditoria (5 and 7) had a capacity of 420 each, much smaller than the largest auditorium previously. The architect was HGP Greentree Allchurch Evans with Higgs and Hill as the main contractor. It opened on 23 September 1993 with a Royal premiere of The Fugitive.

A new glass fronted staircase was woven into the existing facade, which also featured a new canopy, and above, two vertical stacks of large single line monochromic LED dot matrix displays. Auditorium fit-outs were typical of the time with grey coloured Soundfold pleated wall coverings over acoustic absorption, but also featured art deco proscenium details and orange/gold coloured tabs.

The main foyer is on the ground floor, with a large bar area on the 1st floor. A series of escalators enable access to all levels, with Screens 1-4 accessed from the basement, 5 from the ground floor, 6 and 7 from the 2nd floor, and 8 and 9 from the 4th floor.

JBL cinema speakers were used throughout the complex, with the two main auditoria, Screens 5 and 7, being THX certified and featuring JBL 4675 screen speakers, 4645 subwoofers and 8330 surround speakers. Playback of all the major 35mm digital sound formats was available, i.e. Dolby Digital, DTS and SDDS, with Screen 7 in particular equipped for all three systems.

Following a joint venture between Warner Bros. International Theatres and Village Cinemas, the complex became the Warner Village West End, and after the acquisition of Warner Village in 2003, it has been known as Vue West End.

Some of the publicly accessible areas, particularly the foyer and lobby areas, were redecorated in subsequent years, and the large frontage rows of monochrome LED dot matrix displays were initially replaced with printed advertising, and subsequently colour LED displays. Digital projection was installed, Martin Audio speakers replaced the JBL installations, and THX certification was eventually dropped, initially from Screen 5, but later Screen 7 also.

== Today ==
In 2017, the cinema closed for a major refurbishment at a cost of £6.6m, reopening on 10 July 2017, with new finishes in all auditoria and public areas, and larger luxury auditorium seating installed with a commensurate reduction in seating capacity to a total of 1,388. The architect was UNICK Architects, with the foyer, 1st floor bar area and new frontage details by Brinkworth Design, and auditoria largely fitted out by (or on behalf of) Eomac, the walls primarily being covered with stretched fabric over acoustic absorption and acoustic carpet. Proscenium details and tabs have been retained.

Sony 4K projection is installed throughout, with dual Sony FINITY SRX-R515DS projectors, a product Sony markets for premium large format cinemas, in the two main auditoria, Screens 5 and 7; and Sony SRX-R320 projectors elsewhere. Screens 5–8 feature Harkness Clarus XC170 screens. The two main auditoria are also equipped for Dolby Atmos with a Dolby CP-850 processor, Dolby multi-channel amplifiers and Dolby SLS speakers.

The facade has been updated with a new doors, and a new canopy, above which a single large (62.7m^{2}) colour LED display has been installed. The ground floor foyer now features concessions for Square Pie, Pizzeria Malletti and Ben & Jerry's, as well as Vue's own counter, and two bars; one on the ground floor and another on the first floor.

== See also ==
- Scenes in the Square which includes a statue of Wonder Woman on the wall of the cinema
