= Wendeburg =

- Municipality
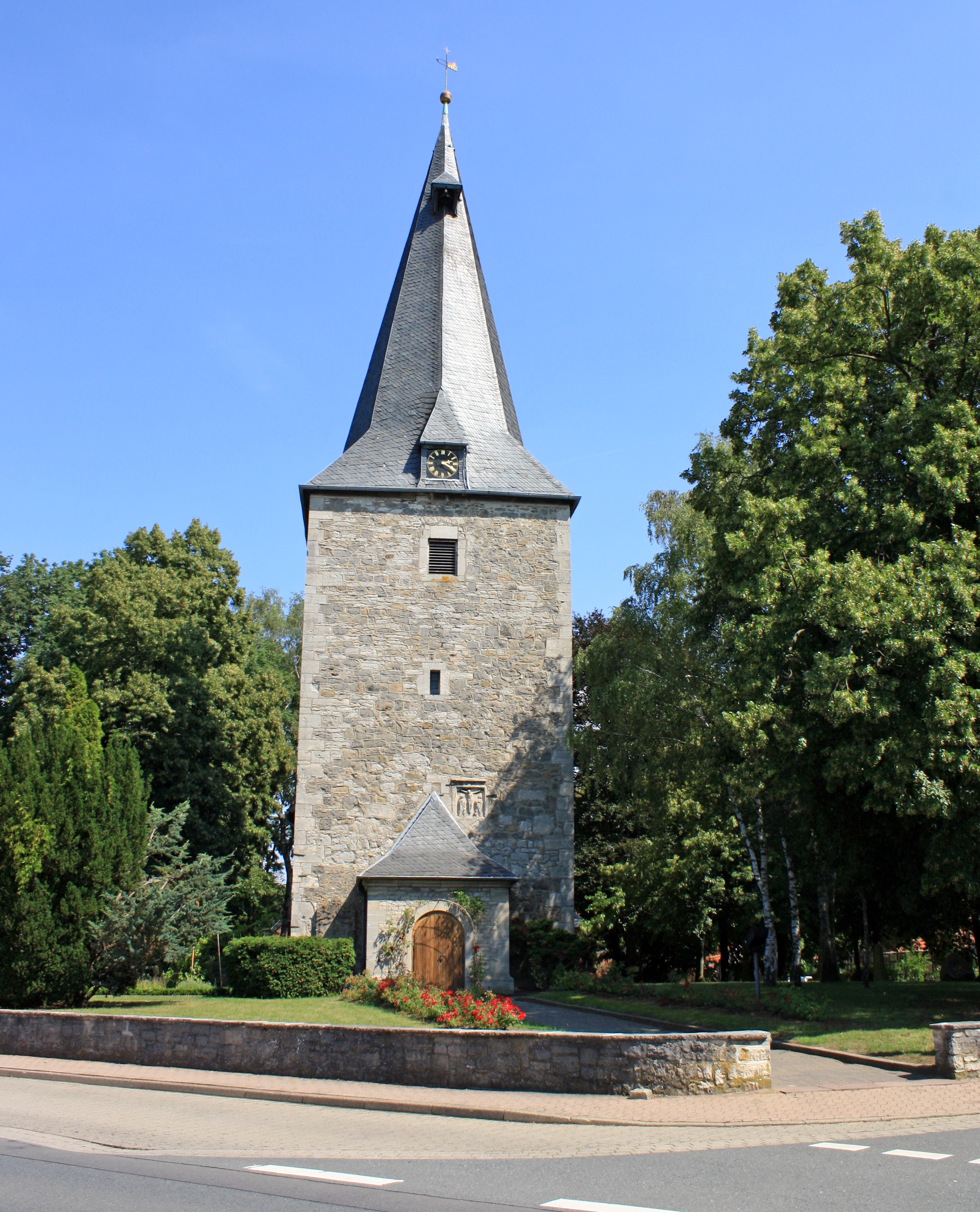
- Lutheran church

- Coat of arms

- Location of Wendeburg within Peine district
- Interactive map of Wendeburg
- Location within Germany Location within Lower Saxony
- Coordinates: 52°19′N 10°24′E
- Country: Germany
- State: Lower Saxony
- District: Peine
- Subdivisions: 8 districts

Government
  - Mayor (2019–24): Gerd Albrecht (CDU)

Area
  - Total: 60.15 km^{2} (23.22 sq mi)
- Elevation: 67 m (220 ft)

Population (2025-12-31)
  - Total: 10,151
  - Density: 168.8/km^{2} (437.1/sq mi)
- Time zone: UTC+01:00 (CET)
  - Summer (DST): UTC+02:00 (CEST)
- Postal codes: 38176
- Dialling codes: 05303, 05302, 05171
- Vehicle registration: PE
- Website: www.wendeburg.de

Wendeburg (German pronunciation: [ˈvɛndəbʊʁk]) is a municipality in the district of Peine, in Lower Saxony, Germany. It is situated approximately 11 km east of Peine, and 12 km northwest of Braunschweig.

== Municipal subdivisions ==
- Bortfeld
- Harvesse
- Meerdorf
- Neubrück and Ersehof
- Rüper
- Sophiental
- Wendeburg, Wendezelle and Zweidorf
- Wense

=== Personalities of the community ===
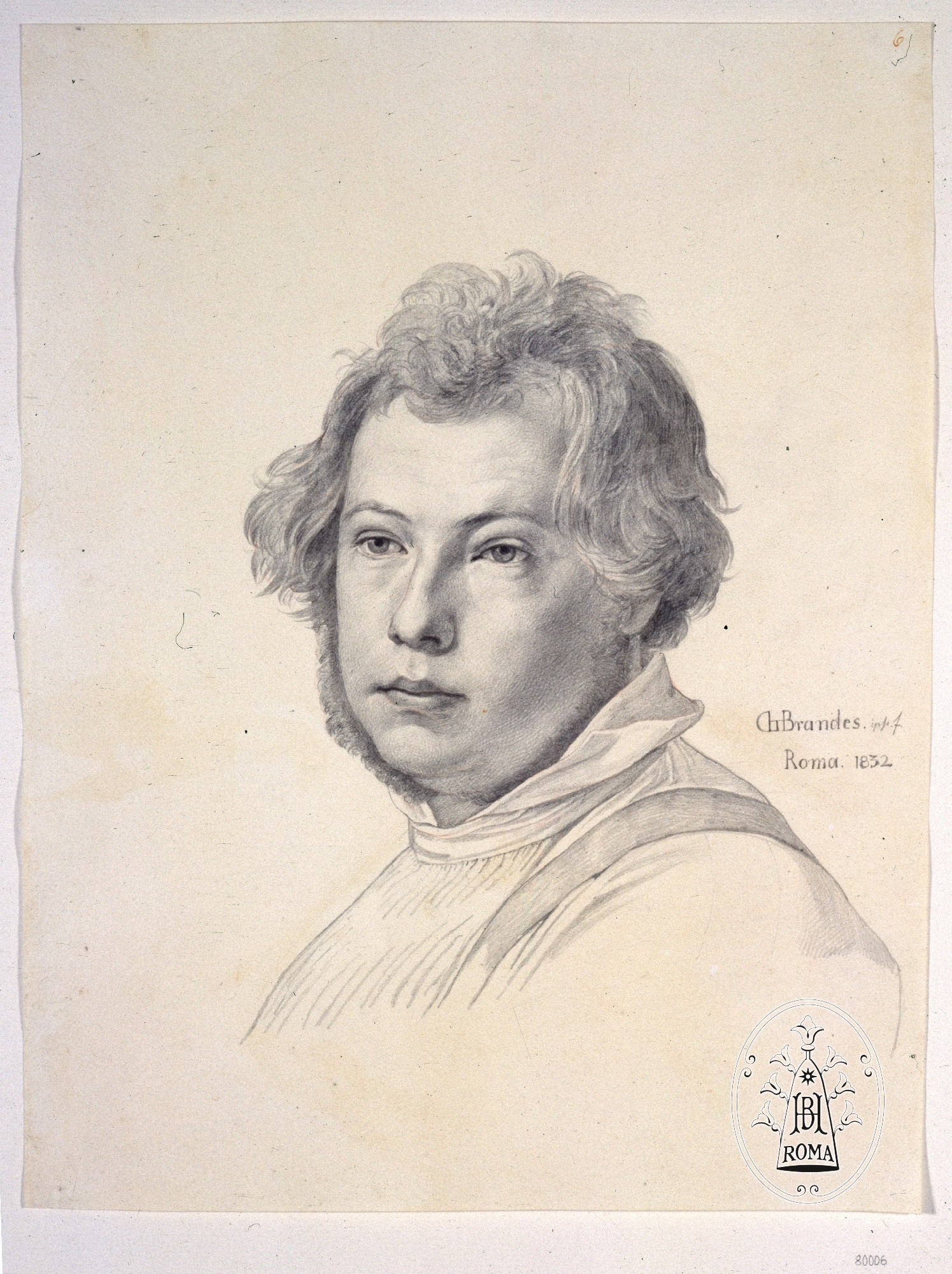
Georg Heinrich Brandes (1832)

- Heinrich Brandes (1803-1868), painter, born in the district of Bortfeld
- Carl Heinrich Theodor Knorr (1800-1875), founder of the food company Knorr, born in the district of Meerdorf
- Gerhard Schrader (1903-1990), chemist, born in the district of Bortfeld
