= Continental (food brand) =

Manufacturer of side dishes and recipe bases

- Area served: Worldwide
- Owner: Unilever
- Parent: Unilever

Continental is a manufacturer of side dishes and recipe bases (including packs of dried pasta and sauces). The company is based in Australia, and is a subsidiary of Unilever. Its Global sister brand is Knorr.

== Information ==
The Continental manufacturer has been in business for over 50 years now. The Continental website includes recipes and cooking ideas for people to try at home while using their products.

== Products ==
Continental produces the following products:

- soups
- side dishes
- Meal Kits
- Meal Bases
- Stocks
- Gravies & Sauces
- Spices
- Deb Mashed Potato
- Surprise Peas

== See also ==
- List of food companies
- List of brand name food products
