= Carl Heinrich Theodor Knorr =

German entrepreneur

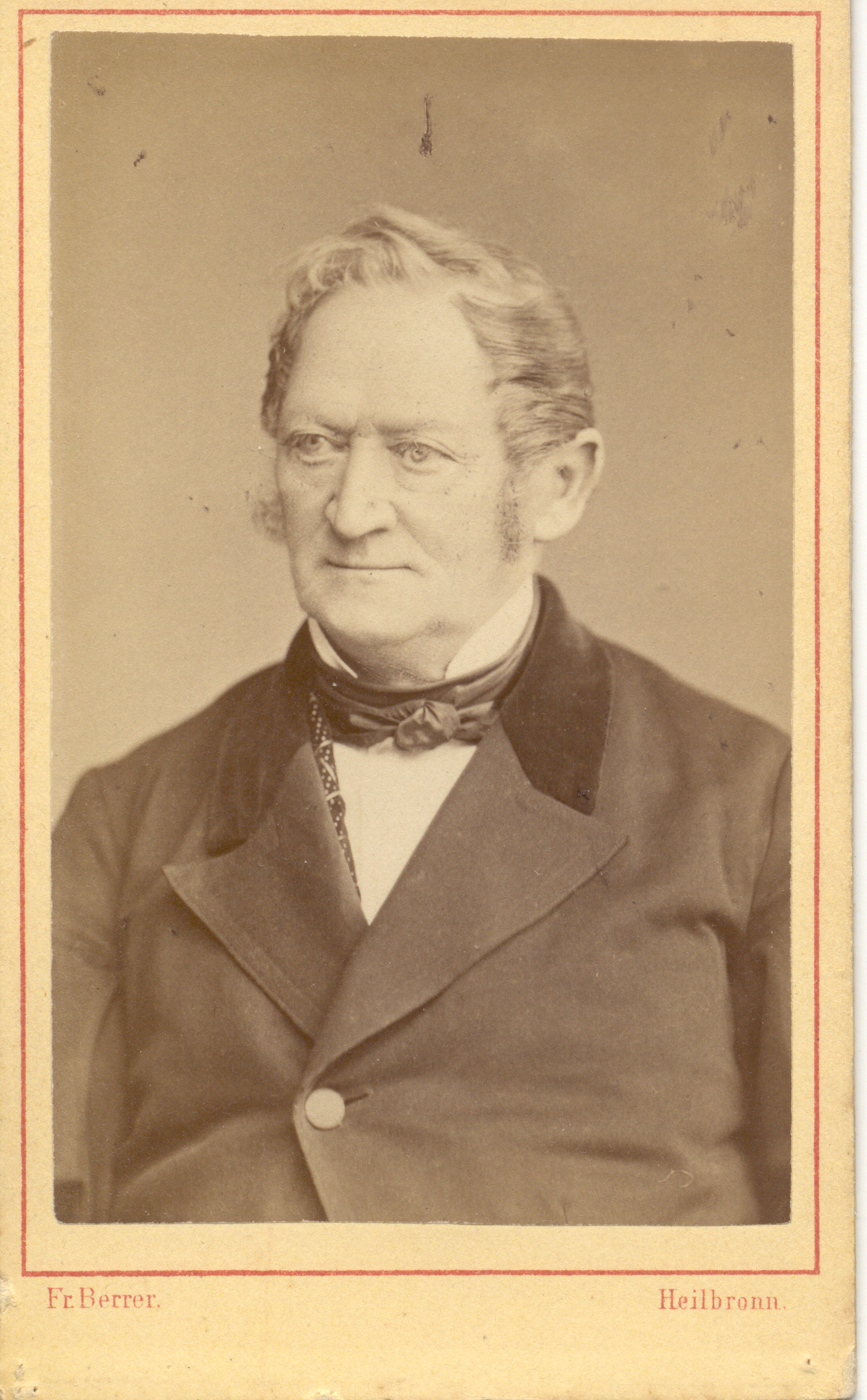
Carl Heinrich Theodor Knorr

Carl Heinrich Theodor Knorr (/nɔːr/; 15 May 1800 in Meerdorf near Braunschweig – 20 May 1875 in Heilbronn), was a German businessman and founder of food and beverage company Knorr.
