= Griffin's Foods =

New Zealand snack-food and confectionery manufacturer

The Griffin's Food Company
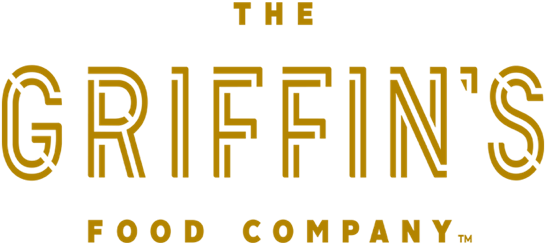
- Formerly: Griffin & Sons, Ltd. (1895–?)
- Type: Private (1864–95); Public (1895–1962); Subsidiary (1962–present)
- Founded: 1864; 162 years ago
- Founder: John Griffin
- Headquarters: Auckland, New Zealand
- Products: Biscuits, chocolate confection, crackers, cereal bars, snacks
- Brands: Griffin's; Huntley & Palmers (Note: Under license); Kettle
- Number of employees: 800 (2014)
- Parent: Intersnack (2021–present) Former: Unisnack ANZ (Note: A joint venture between Universal Robina and Intersnack) (2019–21); Universal Robina (Note: Part of JG Summit Holdings) (2014–19); Pacific Equity Partners (2006–14); Danone (1990–2006); Britannia Foods (1990); Nabisco (1962–90)
- Website: griffinsfoodcompany.com

The Griffin's Foods Company is a New Zealand food company currently headquartered in Auckland and established by John Griffin as a flour and cocoa mill in the city of Nelson in 1864. The company started biscuit manufacturing in 1890. Products commercialised by Griffin's include biscuits, chocolate confection, crackers, cereal bars, and snack foods.

Since 1962, Griffin's has been owned by several companies including Nabisco, Danone, Pacific Equity Partners and Universal Robina. As of 2021, it has been wholly owned by Intersnack. Griffin's had sales of approximately NZ$300 million in 2011.

== History ==
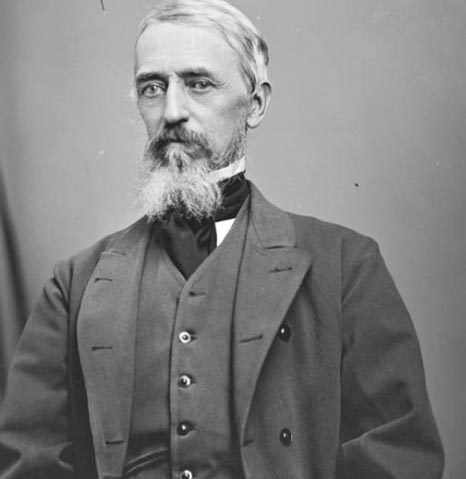
John Griffin, founder

The company was founded by Englishman John Griffin (1813–1893) who established a business as a flour and cocoa miller in 1864 in Nelson, New Zealand. Griffin had arrived in Nelson in 1854, commencing business in a bakery shop one year later. After the premises was severely damaged by an earthquake in 1855, Griffin moved to Christchurch, then returned to Nelson a few years later when conditions improved.

Newspaper records show biscuits were in production by the 1880s and the confectionery arm of the business launched in 1886. By the 1890s Griffin's was producing a range of candied peels and by the late 1900s made drinking cocoa. Most products were distributed via the Griffin's manufacturing plant on Ashmole Street in Christchurch.

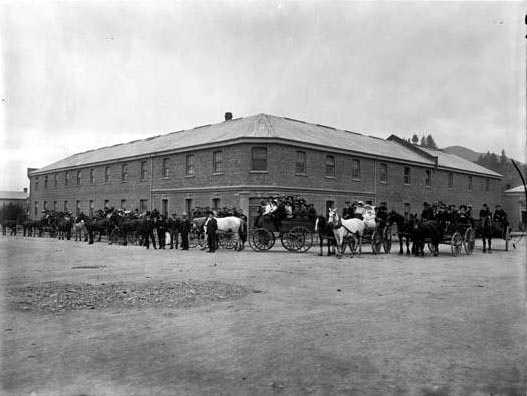
Griffin's factory in Nelson, c. 1905

After Griffin died in 1893, his sons J.H. and G.R. Griffin carried on the family business. When in February 1895 a huge fire caused a new disaster, they formed a public company with a capital of £5,172. In search of further capital to expand the business, in 1897 a chocolate factory was acquired.

Griffin's opened a new factory in Lower Hutt in 1938, transferring its entire biscuit manufacturing operation there and leaving the Nelson factory entirely to confectionery manufacture. Griffin's made army ration biscuits during World War II. This period as a provider of goods for war purposes helped Griffin's to expand. In 1959, Griffin's acquired the Southern Cross Biscuit Factory, a rival company in Whanganui owned by the Dustin family.

In 1962, Griffin's was purchased by Nabisco. Griffin's bought confectionery manufacturer Sweetacres in 1971. The company also added British Huntley & Palmers' crackers to its brand portfolio, and two years later Griffin's acquired Eta Foods including its range of snacks and potato chips brands. The Nelson factory was closed by Nabisco in 1988, with the loss of 137 jobs, most of them women's. The former factory was then demolished. In 1989 Griffin's acquired biscuit company Hudson's, taking on the copyright for the famous Hudson's icon Cookie Bear. When Nabisco was effectively broken up, Griffin's was acquired by Britannia Foods in 1990, but in December of the same year Danone bought it from Britannia Foods.

In 2006 Danone divested Griffin's to Pacific Equity Partners. One year later, Griffin's acquired the Nice & Natural Wrapped Snacks company to become the leading snack food manufacturer in New Zealand.

The Lower Hutt plant closed in 2008 with the loss of 200 jobs, with all production transferred to the Auckland sites. In 2009 Griffin's moved the production of its cream filled biscuits, which account for 2.5% of production, to Fiji.

In July 2014, Pacific Equity Partners divested itself of Griffin's Foods, selling the operations to Philippines company Universal Robina for NZ$700 million. In October 2015, Universal Robina announced they were expanding the Griffin's brand to the Southeast Asian market starting with the Philippines.

In December 2019, Universal Robina and German company Intersnack formed Unisnack ANZ, a joint venture comprising Griffin's and Snack Brands Australia. Intersnack held a 40% stake in the consolidated business. In August 2021, Universal Robina exited the Australian and New Zealand market by selling its remaining 60% stake in Unisnack ANZ to Intersnack.

== Products ==
The company's food range comprises:

Brand	Products
Griffin's	Biscuits, chocolate confections, crackers, muesli bars
Eta	Potato chips, nachos, cheese puffs
Nice & Natural	Muesli bars, protein bars
Huntley & Palmers	Crackers
Kettle	Potato chips

=== Biscuits ===
- Cameo Creme
- Chit Chat
- Chocolate Fingers
- Digestive
- Gingernuts
- Krispie
- Squiggles
- Toffee Pops
- Cookie Bear Hundreds & Thousands

== See also ==
- Huntley & Palmers
- List of food companies
