= Suso (drink) =

Carbonated fruit juice drink

SUSO
- Type: Carbonated fruit juice
- Manufacturer: SUSO drinks Ltd.
- Introduced: 2008
- Color: red
- Related products: PJ drinks

Suso is a carbonated fruit juice drink manufactured and sold in the UK. Founded by creative entrepreneurs Graeme Dignan, Ross Cairns and Tara Macdonald, it is made by London-based Suso Drinks Ltd, run by a team comprising former Red Bull Managing Director Harry Drnec, former general manager of Relentless Sean Uprichard, former CEO at PJ Smoothies Andrew King, and former L'Oreal UK sales director Jamie Farrell.

Launched into the UK market with a £4 million marketing budget in February 2008, Suso is currently distributed to over 600 UK secondary schools and national supermarkets, including Tesco, Sainsbury's, Asda, Morrisons, Waitrose and Superdrug.

It comes in a 250 ml can size available in a variety of flavours: Berry; Orange; Apple; Lemon; Tropical; Mango & Passion Fruit; Forest Fruits. The can is marked as supplying "One of your five-a-day", a reference to the UK government's programme to encourage people to consume five portions of fruit and/or vegetables per day.

In 2012, the brand was sold to Cott Beverages and was relaunched in January 2021 after a few years' absence with a new look.
