= Berenberg (name) =

Berenberg is a surname of German origin. Some notable people with the surname include:

- Members of the Berenberg family, a Hanseatic dynasty of merchants, bankers and senators based in Hamburg:

- Cornelius Berenberg (1634–1711)
- Rudolf Berenberg (1680–1746)
- Paul Berenberg (1716–1768)
- Johann Berenberg (1718–1772)
- Elisabeth Berenberg (1749–1822)

- William Berenberg (1915–2005), American physician and Harvard professor
- David P. Berenberg (1890–1974), American socialist teacher, editor, and writer

== See also ==
- Berenberg-Gossler (surname)
- Berenberg (disambiguation)
