= Mrs. Wagner's Pies =

Single-serving pies sold in waxed paper

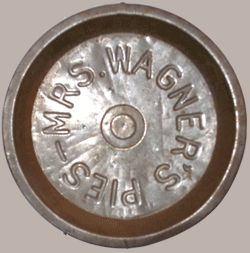
Mrs. Wagner Pies tin pan, c. 1940.

Mrs. Wagner's Pies were single-serving pies sold in waxed paper, produced by the Wagner Baking Company, originally located in Ocean Grove, New Jersey, and later in Brooklyn, New York.

The eponymous Mrs. Wagner was selling homemade pies in Jersey City, New Jersey, as early as 1897. She was Mary J. Wagner, wife of William Wagner; she died in Ocean Grove on March 31, 1911, aged 72.

In September 1940, The Newark News described Mrs. Wagner's Pies as the "largest pie bakery in the country, with its home plant in Newark and five branches as far west as Chicago." Its president at the time was F. W. Birkenhauer.

The company ceased operations in July 1966.

== In popular culture ==
The pies are mentioned in "America," a 1968 song by Simon and Garfunkel.
