= Cameo Creme =

Chocolate biscuit made in New Zealand

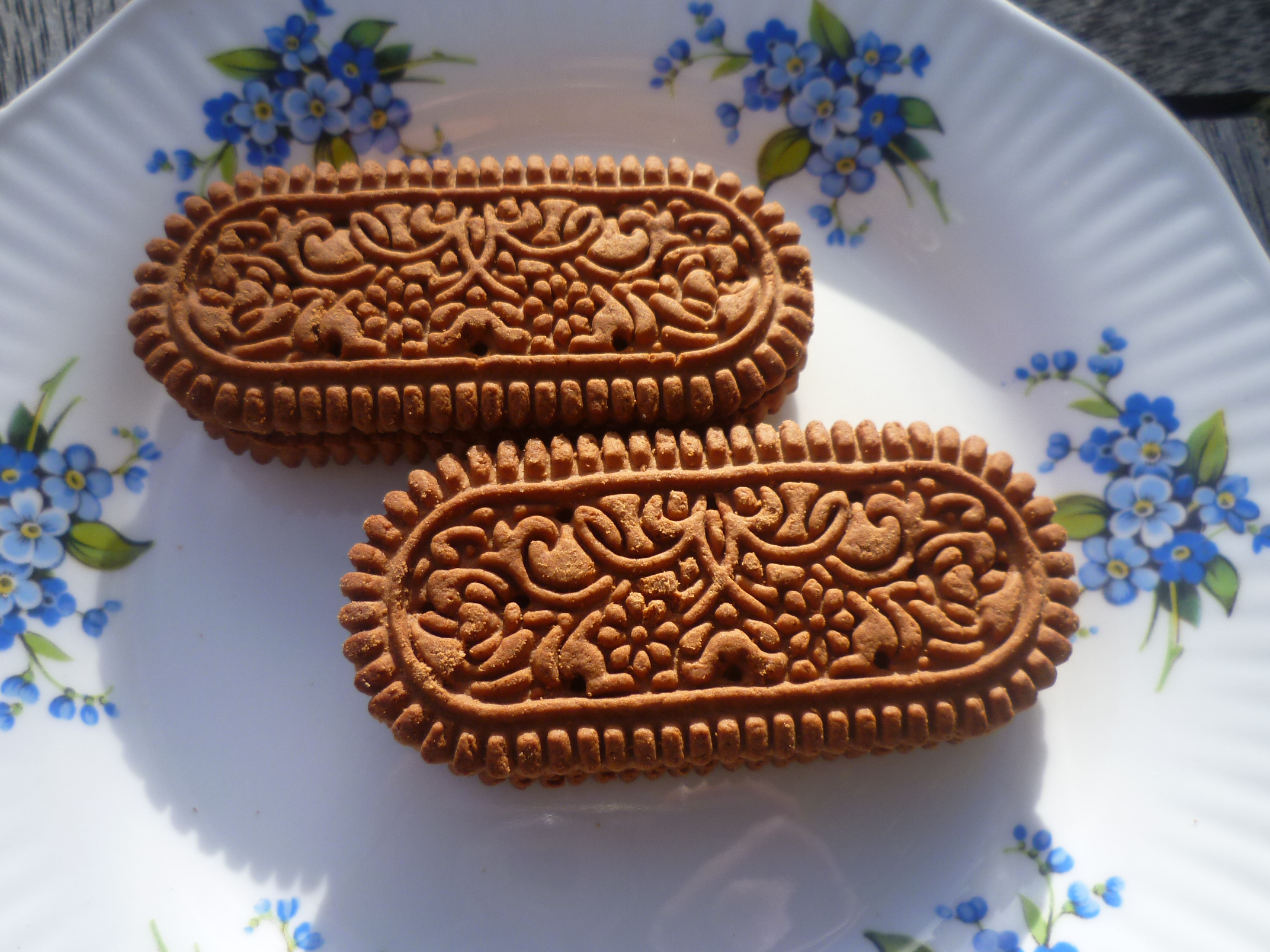
- Type: Biscuit
- Place of origin: New Zealand
- Created by: Griffin's Foods
- Main ingredients: Wheat flour, sugar, cocoa powder, coconut

The Cameo Creme is a chocolate sandwich biscuit with a coconut cream filling made by Griffin's Foods of New Zealand.

Cameo Cremes are available in 250g single packs. Alternative flavours that were available previously included Jaffa and Mint Creme.

A brass Cameo Creme biscuit press used in the Lower Hutt Griffins factory is an object in the History Collection in the Museum of New Zealand/Te Papa Tongarewa in Wellington.

== Ingredients ==
Cameo Cremes are made with wheat flour, sugar, vegetable fat, emulsifier (soya lecithin), antioxidant (306), invert syrup, milk solids, cocoa powder, coconut, cornflour, salt, edible colors (150, 110, 155), raising agents (500, 450) and flavours.
