= Berenberg (disambiguation) =

Berenberg may refer to:

- Berenberg Bank, a German financial institution
- Berenberg family, a banking family after which Berenberg Bank is named
- Berenberg (surname), other people with the surname Berenberg
- Berenberg Verlag, a German book publishing company in Berlin
