= Rafhan =

Pakistani food brand

Rafhan Maize
- Product type: Food processing
- Produced by: Unilever Pakistan
- Website: Official website

Rafhan (Urdu pronunciation: [ræfˈhɑːn] raff-HAHN) is a Pakistani food brand owned by Unilever and one of the largest of the company. Primarily associated with corn oil and desserts, the brand offers a range of products, including corn oil, cornflour, custard, ice cream, jelly, and pudding.

Rafhan brand was established by CPC International and was later acquired by Unilever.

== History ==
It was established as a company named, Rafhan Best Foods Limited, in 1997 and was subsequently listed on the stock exchange of Pakistan. It is known for products such as Knorr, Energile, Glaxose-D, custards, jelly, and Rafhan.

In 2007, Rafhan Best Foods Limited was renamed as Unilever Foods Pakistan Limited.
