= Biscuit rose de Reims =

French biscuit

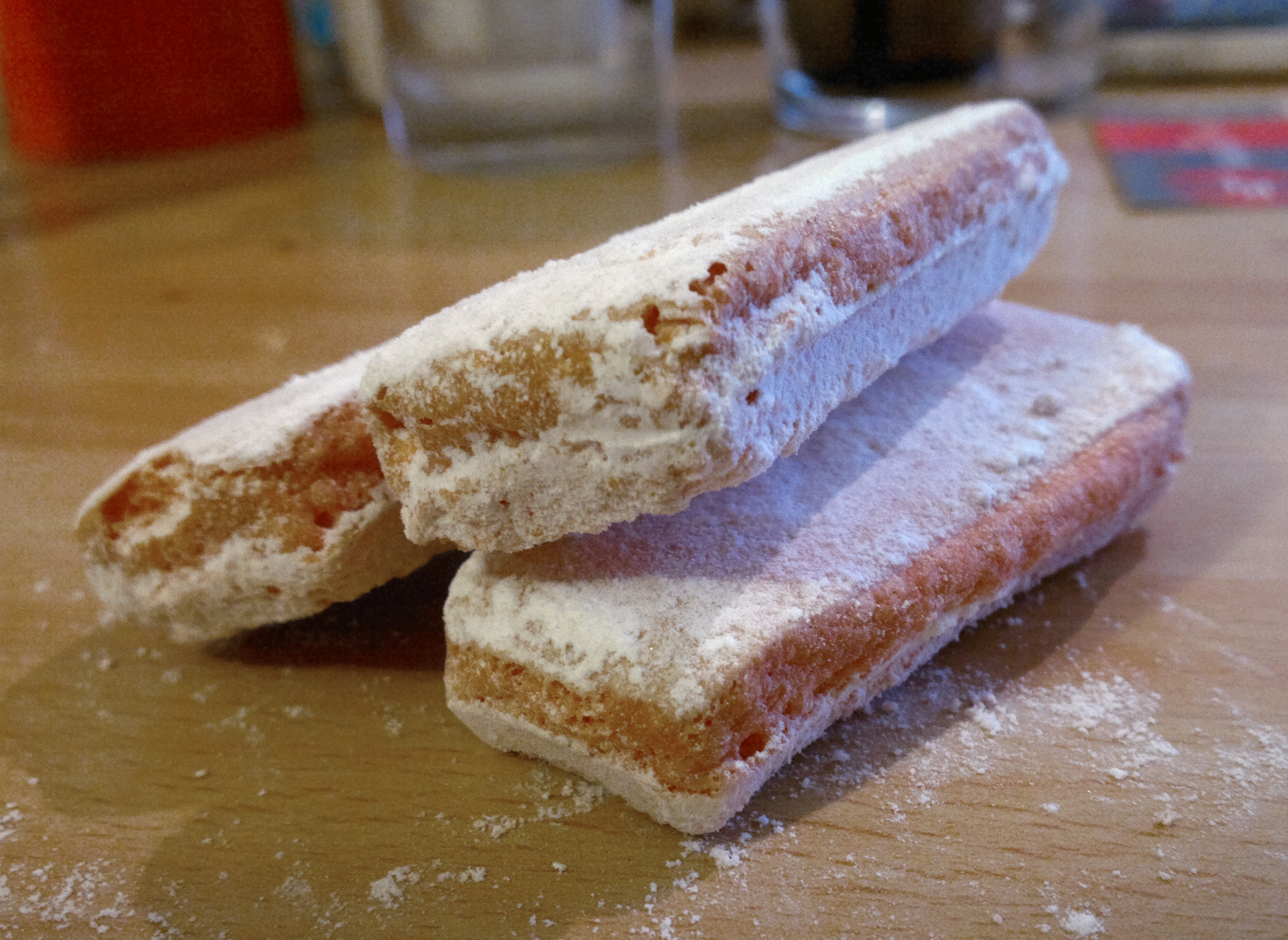
- Biscuit rose de Reims
- Alternative names: Pink biscuits of Reims
- Type: Biscuit
- Place of origin: France
- Region or state: Reims
- Invented: 1690
- Main ingredients: carmine, flour, sugar, eggs
- Ingredients generally used: vanilla

Biscuit rose de Reims (French: biscuits roses de Reims), is a pink biscuit found in French cuisine, made pink by the addition of carmine.

== Background ==
Originating in Reims, Biscuit rose de Reims is a product of the Biscuits Fossier company. It is customary to dip the biscuit in champagne or red wine. The biscuit was created around 1690 in Reims. A baker wanted to make the most of the heat in the bread oven between the two batches, so he had the idea of creating a special dough; baking it twice, which is where the name "biscuit" or "bis-cuit" meaning "baked twice" in French. The biscuit initially was white. In order to add flavor to it, a pod of vanilla was introduced into the recipe. This vanilla left brown traces on the biscuit. In order to hide them, the baker decided to add a natural color based on cochineal, a scarlet dye, to disguise his mistake. From this sequence of events, the Biscuit Rose de Reims was born. The biscuit is oblong in shape, and is lightly sprinkled with caster sugar. Enthusiasts for the biscuit included King Charles X, Leopold II of Belgium, the Russian czar, and the Marquise de Polignac. It is commonly dipped in the following liquids to bring out its flavor:

- Champagne
- Ratafia
- Coffee
- Lemonade
- Milk

It quickly became a great success in terms of confectionery throughout France. The original recipe of the famous "Biscuit Rose" is still kept secret by Fossier's confectioners. Despite the basic ingredients that include eggs, sugar, flour, and vanilla, the traditional French recipe demands special mastery and daintiness.
