= Mercy (drink) =

- Website: drinkmercy.com

Mercy is a non-alcoholic, non-caffeinated beverage marketed as a preventative for hangovers and alcohol flush.
