= Zarex (drink) =

American sweet drink concentrate

ZaRex is an American sweet drink concentrate. It is also spelled Za-Rex.

ZaRex is a type of sweet fruit syrup that can either be mixed with water or soda water, poured over shaved ice, used in cupcakes, or poured into alcoholic beverages. ZaRex was produced from the early 1900s and was especially popular in New England. Its popularity began waning in the 1980s, and production stopped in 2008. In 2010, two South Shore, Massachusetts entrepreneurs purchased the rights to the ZaRex name and recipe and production resumed. ZaRex has received orders from as far away as Alaska. ZaRex customers are able to customize the new ZaRex bottles for special occasions. The most popular customizations include holiday-themed labels for Valentine's Day.

== Manufacturers ==
ZaRex was manufactured by the One Pie Canning Company until the summer of 2008. Rights to the brand were purchased by ZaRex USA, LLC, which had resumed manufacture of several flavors, which were available in a growing number of Massachusetts stores and via their website. The company ceased production of the syrups in 2019.

As of July 1, 2021, the web site of ZaRex Cape Cod MA (http://www.zarexcapecodma.com/) says that they are "Preparing to return" and lists a phone number for ordering. They indicate that they have revised the recipe by removing fructose and will be producing one flavor, raspberry, "to ensure success." The actual manufacturing of the syrup will be done by Lancaster Fine Foods.

== In popular culture ==
ZaRex is mentioned in Stephen King's works such as The Stand, as well as Dreamcatcher, It, The Reach, and The Tommyknockers
