= Gilliam Candy Company =

American candy manufacturer

Gilliam Candy Company is an American candy manufacturer established in Paducah, Kentucky, by Cleve Gilliam in 1927. They are known for making candy sticks.

== Overview ==
Gilliam Company made Kentucky Blue Grass nickel candy bars in its early years.

In the 1930s, the company expanded with Bacon Slice, Tummy Full, and Cello Sally lines.

In recent decades, after James Lacy purchased the company from Bruce Pope, it expanded its candy lines to include Kits (miniature square taffy candy with flavors including banana, peanut butter, chocolate, and strawberry wrapped with a machine used to package bouillon cubes), BB Bats (taffy lollipops in strawberry, chocolate, banana, and molasses peanut flavors), Slo Pokes (caramel on a stick), and Sophie Mae Candies (which date to 1884). These brands were subsequently licensed to other producers.
