= Nexcite =

Carbonated beverage

Nexcite AB
- Company type: Private
- Industry: Drink
- Founded: 2001
- Headquarters: Stockholm, Sweden
- Products: soft drinks
- Website: www.nexcite.com

Nexcite is a non-alcoholic carbonated beverage with a proprietary formulation of herbal extracts and a touch of caffeine. Product development and production is located in Sweden.

== The five "supplements" ==
- Damiana - A herb derived from the leaves of a Latin American bush. It is said to have stimulating properties on blood circulation thought to give it mood enhancing, anti-depressive and libido enhancing qualities. However, these statements have not been proven.
- Ginseng - Known for its many positive effects that improve physical and psychological performance.
- Guarana - A South American seed extract which contains caffeine.
- Maté - An increasingly popular herb with medicinal like qualities which aid in relaxation, stress relief and mood improvement as well as powers of concentration.
- Schizandra - A herbal remedy made from a small red fruit growing in China. Known widely in the Far East for its ability to energize and vitalize the body.
