= Baron von Lemon =

American cartoon character

Baron von Lemon was a cartoon character created by the Pillsbury Company in 1967 to promote a powdered drink of the same name.

His life story and whimsically humorous adventures were chronicled in the promotional comic book "The Adventures of Baron Von Lemon", written and illustrated by Pete Bastiansen, which sold for 25 cents in grocery stores and is now quite rare. According to the story, he was born "of lemon extraction" and seemed like a normal baby, except he was "shaped like a lemon. And he was yellow. And he was a lemon." Unlike other babies, from his crib he made statements such as, "I think our tax structure is atrocious." When he grew up, he desired to become Baron, which he achieved by walking into the General's office and asking for it, pointing out he was the only one in the air force with a plane. He then flew off to see his aunt, leaving the General to figure out how to stop their arch-enemy, Demon Thirst.

His fellow flyers were Crash Orange and Sir Reginald Lime-Lime.

A pack of Baron Von Lemon lemonade sold for 10 cents, and, with water added, made one quart of sugar-free lemonade.

The promotional comic is rare; it has never been listed in the annual Overstreet Comic Book Price Guides, although the guides have a separate category for such; and other titles of the same type of book are listed there.

== See also ==
- Funny Face (drink mix)
