= Krispie =

New Zealand coconut biscuit

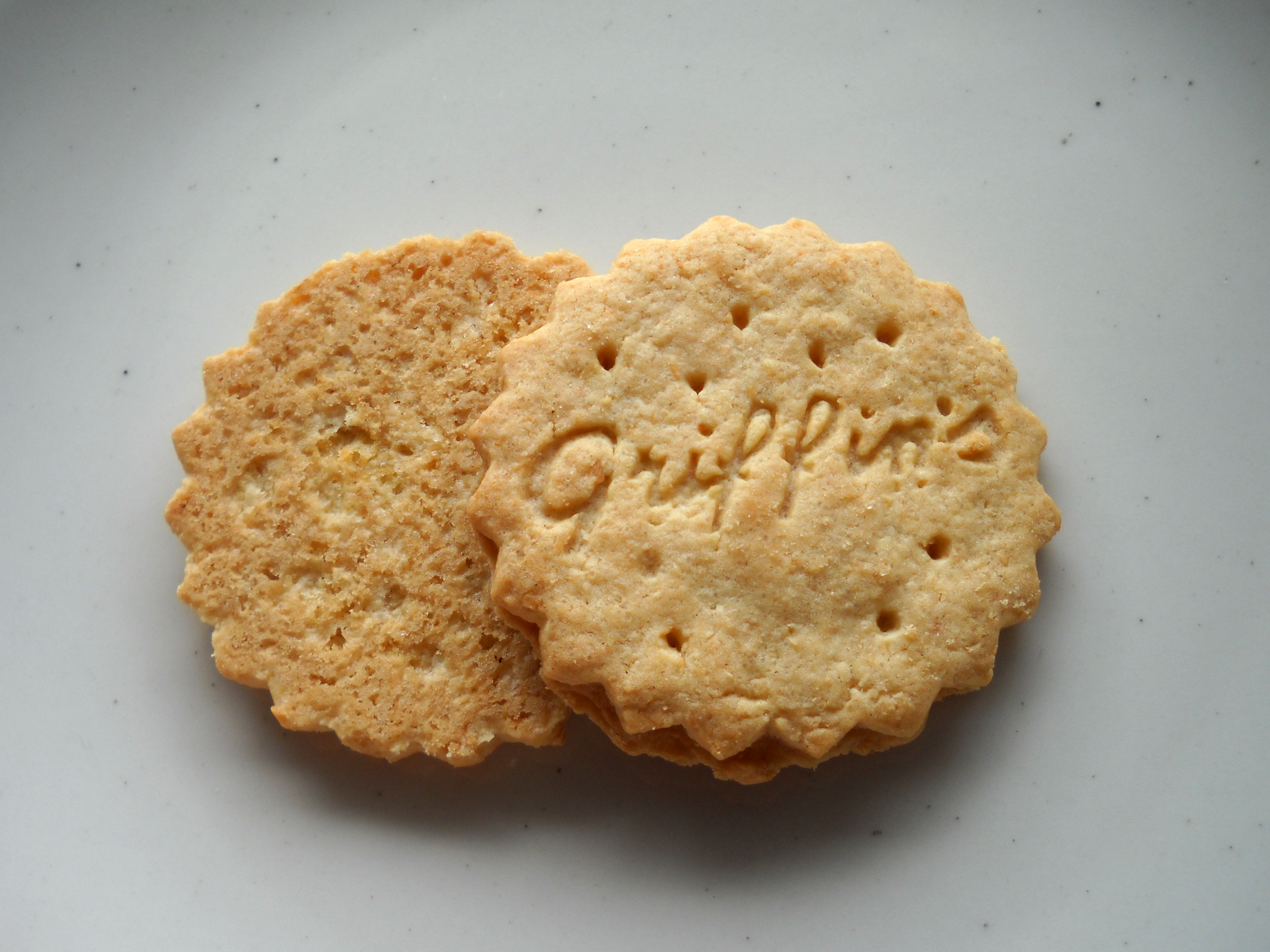
- Type: Biscuit
- Place of origin: New Zealand
- Created by: Griffin's Foods
- Main ingredients: Wheat flour, sugar, coconut

The Krispie is a toasted coconut biscuit made by Griffin's Foods of New Zealand.

Krispies are available in 250 g single packs and 500 g double packs. A chocolate-coated version is also made.
