= Mr Sherick's Shakes =

British milkshake brand manufactured by Mr Shericks Ltd

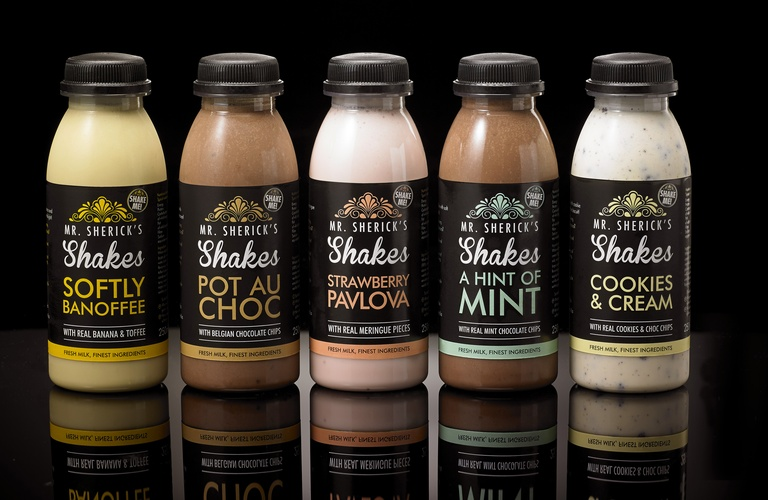
- The 5 flavours of Mr Sherick's Shakes
- Type: Milkshake
- Manufacturer: Mr Shericks Ltd
- Origin: United Kingdom
- Introduced: 2013
- Website: www.mrshericksshakes.co.uk

Mr Sherick's Shakes (/ˈʃɛrɪk/) is a brand of milkshake sold mainly in the United Kingdom. Manufactured by Mr Shericks Ltd, it was first launched into the British retail market in 2013 in five varieties, each consisting of a flavoured milkshake base mixed with small pieces of food inclusions.

== Flavours ==
The brand is currently produced in six flavours.

Flavour	Availability
Softly Banoffee	Oct 2013—
Pot Au Choc	Oct 2013—
Strawberry Pavlova	Oct 2013—
A Hint of Mint	Oct 2013—
Cookies and Cream	Oct 2013—
Choc Chip Latte	Aug 2016—

The range is stocked by premium retailers including Selfridges, Harrods, Waitrose, Booths and Moto.

== Mr Sherick ==
The brand is eponymously named after its creator Andrew Sherick - a former Marks & Spencer Senior Buyer and ex-Chairman of the British Sandwich Association. In his Buying capacity at Marks & Spencer, Sherick spent years working in milkshake market analytics and had become aware of a gap at the premium end of the market for a highly indulgent milkshake brand. After working with artisan chefs for over four years to develop a range of milkshakes he felt were good enough to fill the market gap he had perceived, he resigned from his 22-year-long employment in 2013 to embark on an entrepreneurial journey to bring his own milkshake brand to market.
