= Iran Dairy Industries Co. =

Iranian dairy company

Iran Dairy Industries Co (Pegah)
- Company type: Public
- Industry: Food processing
- Founded: Tehran, Iran (1954; 72 years ago)
- Headquarters: Africa St., Tehran, Iran
- Area served: Worldwide
- Key people: Mr. Abdolamir Barootkoob (Member of the Board and CEO), Mr. Siavash Niazi (Chairman of the Board)
- Products: Dairy products, Ice Cream, Early life nutrition
- Number of employees: 8000 (end 2014)
- Website: www.pegah.ir

Iran Dairy Industries Co. (Persian: صنایع شیر ایران, Sanāye'-e Shir-e Irān) is a dairy corporation in Iran.

== Company overview ==
Iran Dairy Industries Co. is the biggest dairy company in Middle East, producing 1.5 million tonnes of milk per year. In 2014, 30% of domestic Iranian market was supplied by Iran Dairy Industries.

== Company products ==
- milk
- Yoghourt
- cream
- cheese
- Butter
- Kefir & doogh
- Ice Cream
- Dairy Powders
- Herbal Carbonated Drinks

== Group of Companies ==
- Arak Pegah
- East Azarbaijan Pegah
- West Azarbaijan Pegah
- Isfahan Pegah
- Tehran Pegah
- Pegah Golpayegan
- Zanjan Pegah
- Khorasan Pegah
- Khozestan Pegah
- Fars Pegah
- Kerman Pegah
- Lorestan Pegah
- Hamedan Pegah
- Lactana Packing Industry Pegah
- Market Wide Area 1
- Market Wide Area 2
- Market Wide Area 3
- Market Wide Area 5
- Commercial Sepide Kavir Fars
- Gilan Pegah
- Golestan Pegah
