= Knorr (brand) =

German food and beverage trademark owned by the British-Dutch corporation Unilever

- Current logo by Jones Knowles Ritchie used since 2019
- Product type: Food & beverage
- Current owner: McCormick Company
- Country: Germany
- Introduced: 1838; 188 years ago in Heilbronn, Germany
- Related brands: Continental (Australia); Royco (Indonesia and Kenya)
- Markets: Worldwide
- Previous owners: Carl Heinrich Theodor Knorr; Bestfoods Corporation
- Ambassador: Carl Heinrich Knorr
- Website: knorr.com

Knorr (/nɔːr/; German: [knɔʁ]) is a German food and beverage trademark based in Heilbronn, Germany, founded in 1838 and owned by the American company McCormick & Company since 2026, after it buys unilever’s bought Knorr's original business, with the exception of Japan, where it is made under license by Ajinomoto. It produces dehydrated soup and meal mixes, bouillon cubes and condiments.

== History ==
Knorr was founded in 1838 by Carl Heinrich Theodor Knorr (1800–1875). Knorr headquarters are in Heilbronn, Germany.

In 1912, the first Knorr bouillon cube was introduced. Carl Heinrich Knorr began experimenting with drying vegetables and seasoning to preserve nutrition and flavour, which led to Knorr's first launch of dried soups across Continental Europe in 1873.

== Worldwide ==
Knorr is available around the world. By 2025, the Knorr brand expanded to over ninety countries, from eight countries in 1957.

In some countries in Latin America, such as Mexico, the brand is known as Knorr-Suiza.

=== Controversy ===
In 2015, the Knorr instant noodles came under scrutiny from the Food Safety and Standards Authority of India (FSSAI). The product wasn't featured in FSSAI's approved noodle, pasta and macaroni products list.

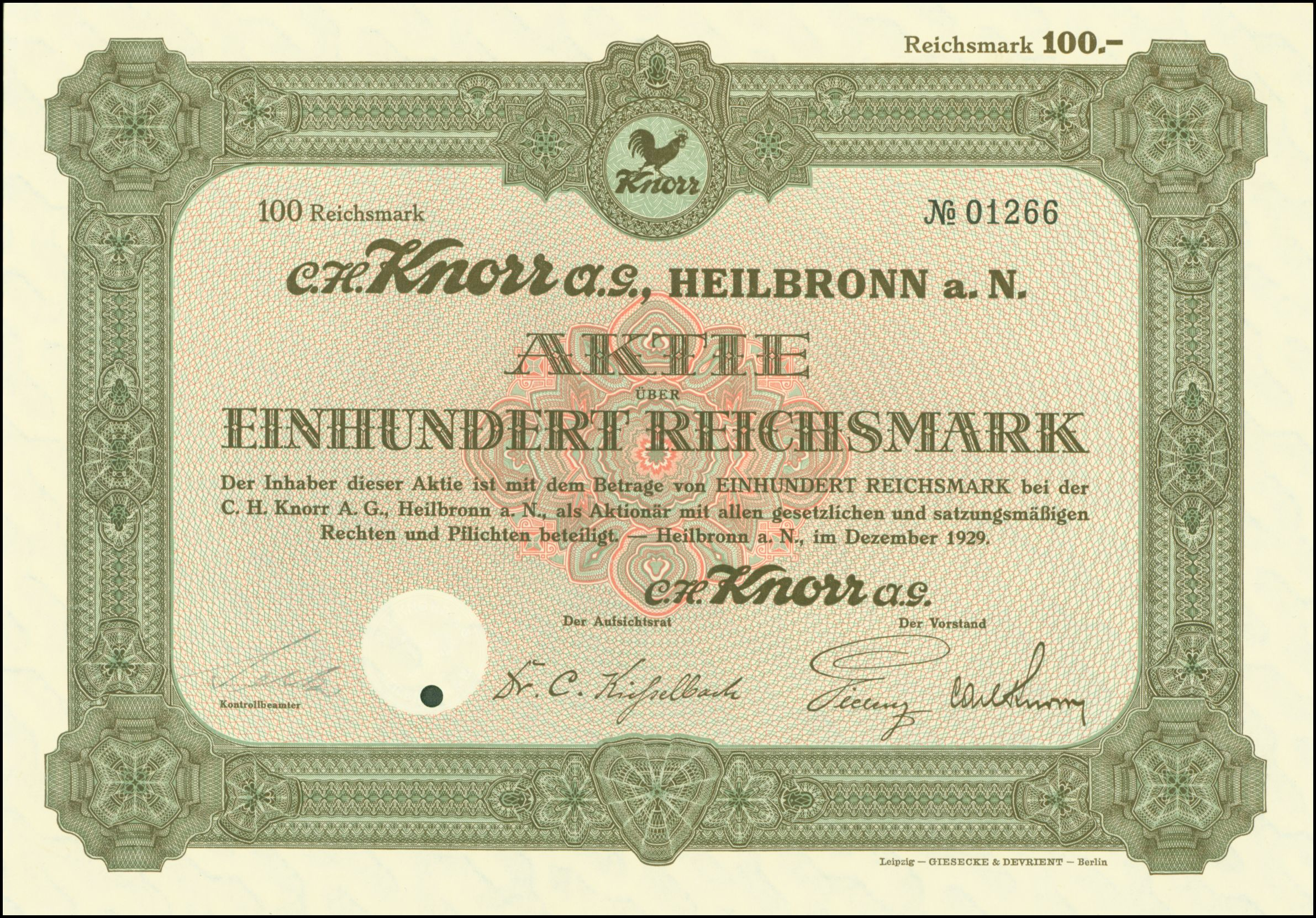
Share of the C. H. Knorr AG, issued December 1929

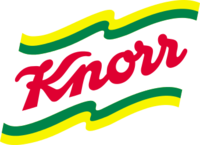
The old logo of Knorr used from 1988 to 2004

The third logo of Knorr used from 2004 to 2019

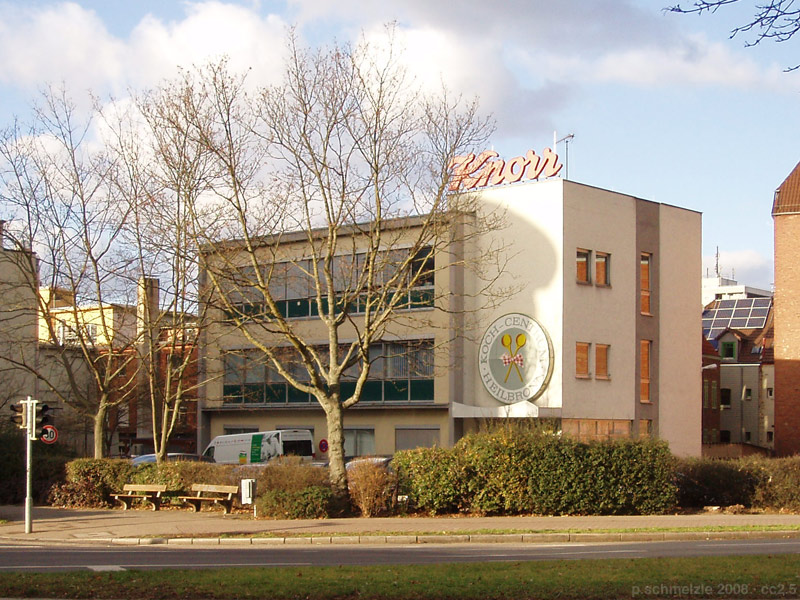
Knorr Cooking Center in Heilbronn
