= San Nicasio =

Spanish brand of potato chips

- Brand logo, 2012
- Industry: Snack foods
- Founded: 1999
- Founder: Rafael del Rosal Lopez; Carmen Osuna
- Headquarters: Priego de Córdoba, Province of Córdoba, Spain
- Products: Potato chips
- Website: sannicasio.es/ENG/

San Nicasio is a Spanish brand of gourmet potato chips, established in 1999. The slow cooked chips have won a number of food industry awards for quality and have received a level of notoriety due to the high price tag of the product.

== History ==
San Nicasio was established in 1999 in Priego de Córdoba, in the Andalusian mountains of Spain, by Rafael del Rosal Lopez and his wife Carmen Osuna. They are being distributed by Fayrefield Foods in the UK, who are targeting distributors such as Harvey Nichols and Harrods.

== Product ==
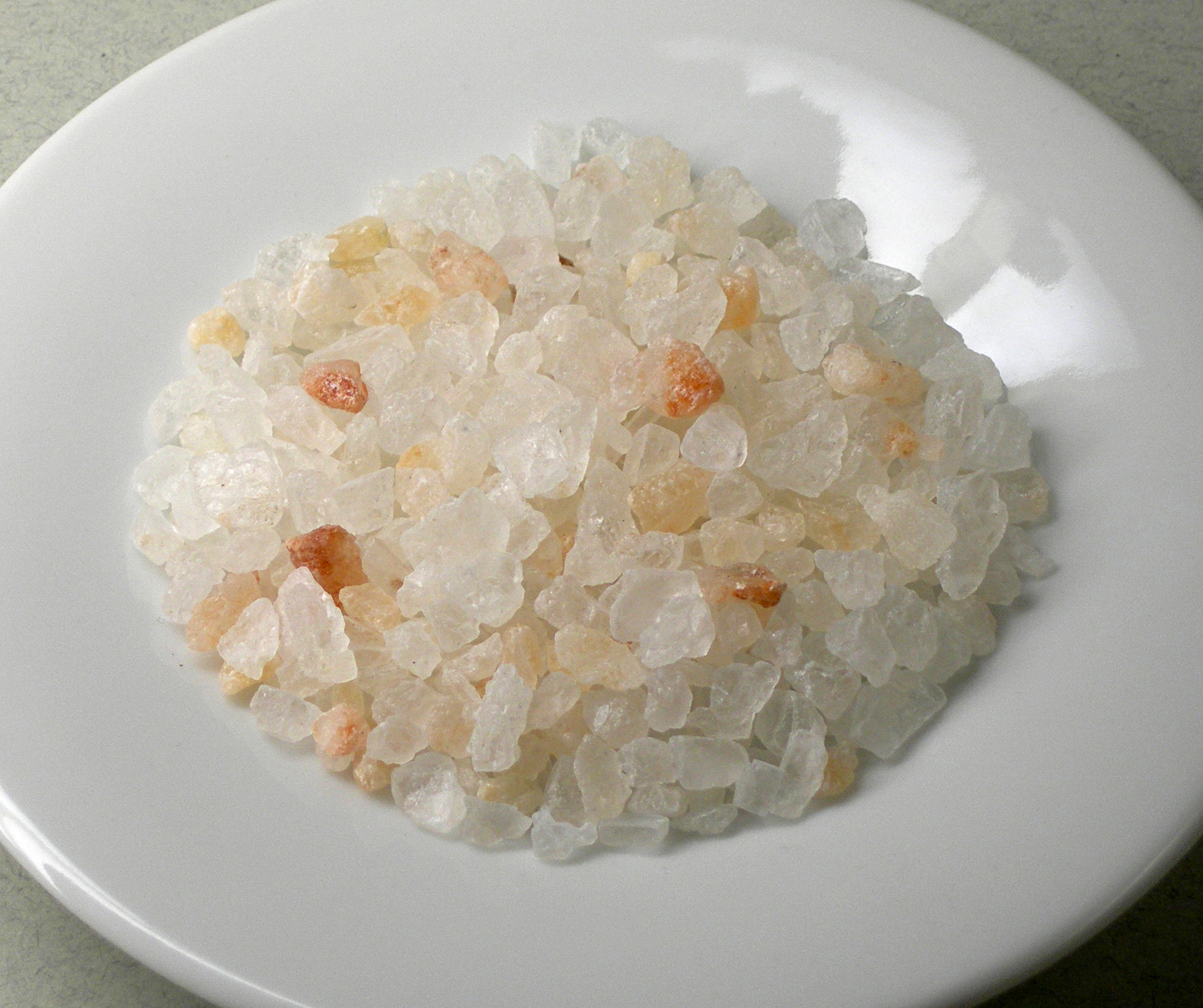
Himalayan "pink" salt

San Nicasio are handmade small-batch potato chips, made with Catalan potatoes, extra virgin olive oil and Himalayan pink salt (a marketing term for rock salt mined in Khewra Salt Mines, Pakistan). The olive oil used has the "Priego de Córdoba" denomination of origin. As of 2012, they are only available in salted flavour and two sizes, 40 g (1.4 oz) and 190 g (6.7 oz).

=== Cooking ===
The chips are slow cooked, unlike most other brand-name chips. According to owner Lopez this is "to prevent the formation of undesirable substances".

=== Pricing ===
In 2011, the product received press coverage on release in the United Kingdom due to the £4 pricing for the larger packet, almost double the market standard. Grocery magazine The Grocer asked "will British crisp-lovers fork out almost four quid for a new super-premium snack?", although it did not speculate on the answer to this question. The Rich Times stated that analysts "are as yet divided" as to whether or not a product at this price point "makes any sense".

== Awards ==
The brand has won a number of food industry awards and certifications.

- 2008 Monde Selection Gold medal
- 2009 Monde Selection Gold medal
- 2010 Monde Selection Gold medal
  - 2010 Monde Selection International High Quality Trophy (for 3 consecutive gold medals)
- 2011 Monde Selection Gold medal
- 2011 Expoliva award for "Best Food made with Olive Oil"
- 2012 Monde Selection Gold medal
