= Biscuits Fossier =

French manufacturer of biscuits

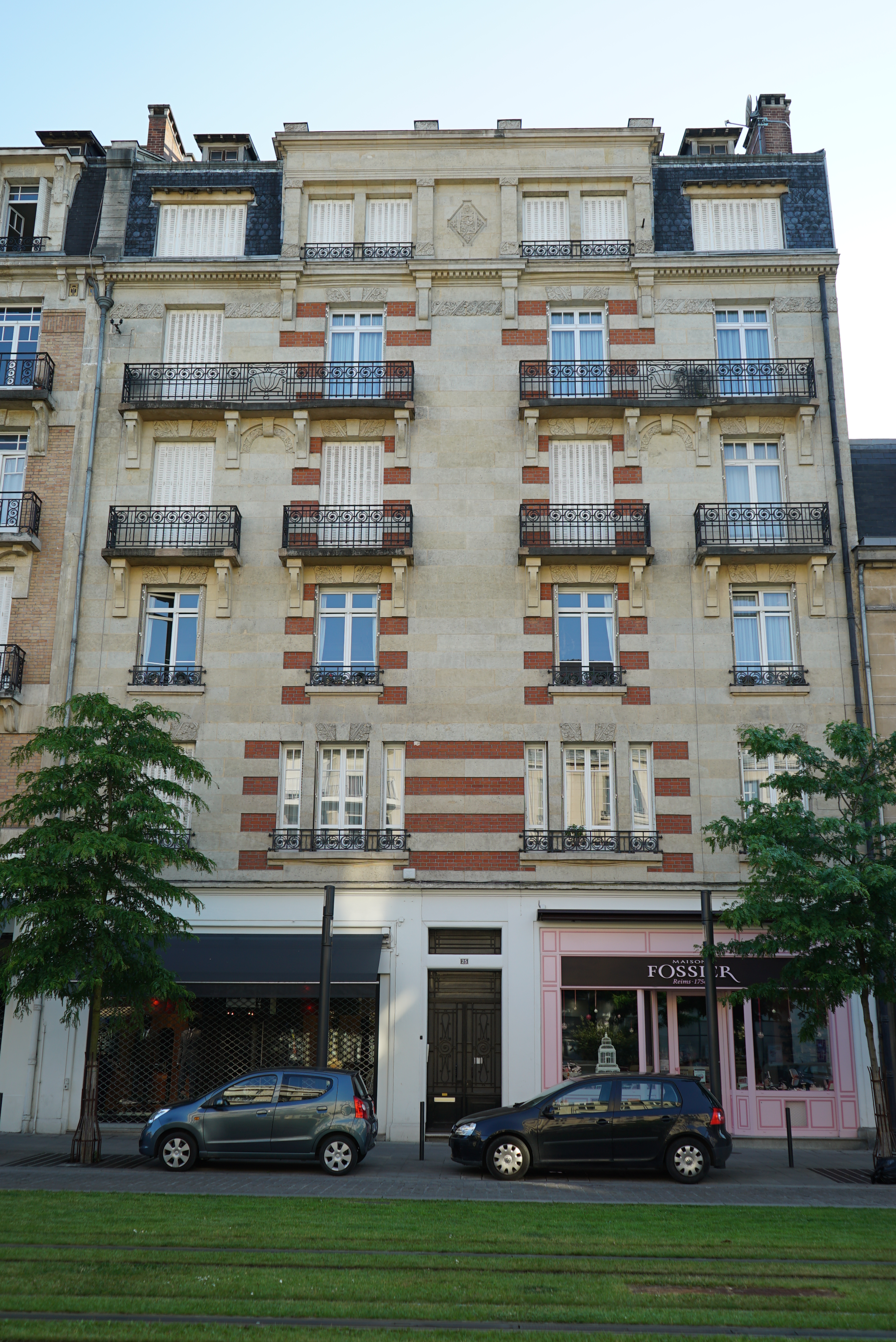
Outlet in Reims, France

Biscuits Fossier is a Reims, France based manufacturer of biscuits, gingerbread, sweets and marzipan-based confectionery.

The tradition of baking goes back to 1430 in the city of Reims, with the foundation of the Guild of Baking. Around 1690, Champagne bakers created a recipe for enjoying the warm bread oven after baking bread, to create a sweet delicacy, from which the "bis-cuit 'of Reims" was born. In 1756, during the reign of Louis XV, the company was founded, and in 1775 the companies biscuits were present at the Coronation of Louis XVI at Reims. The company subsequently became the supplier of biscuits to the King, and in 1825 received a diploma with the Royal seal of King Charles X, recognizing the quality of the biscuits.

In 1845, baker Mousier Fossier took over this main biscuit house of Reims, and he subsequently took over all mass-production based biscuit making in the city of the main types. Today, Biscuits Fossier employs over 100 people, making biscuits and confectionery.

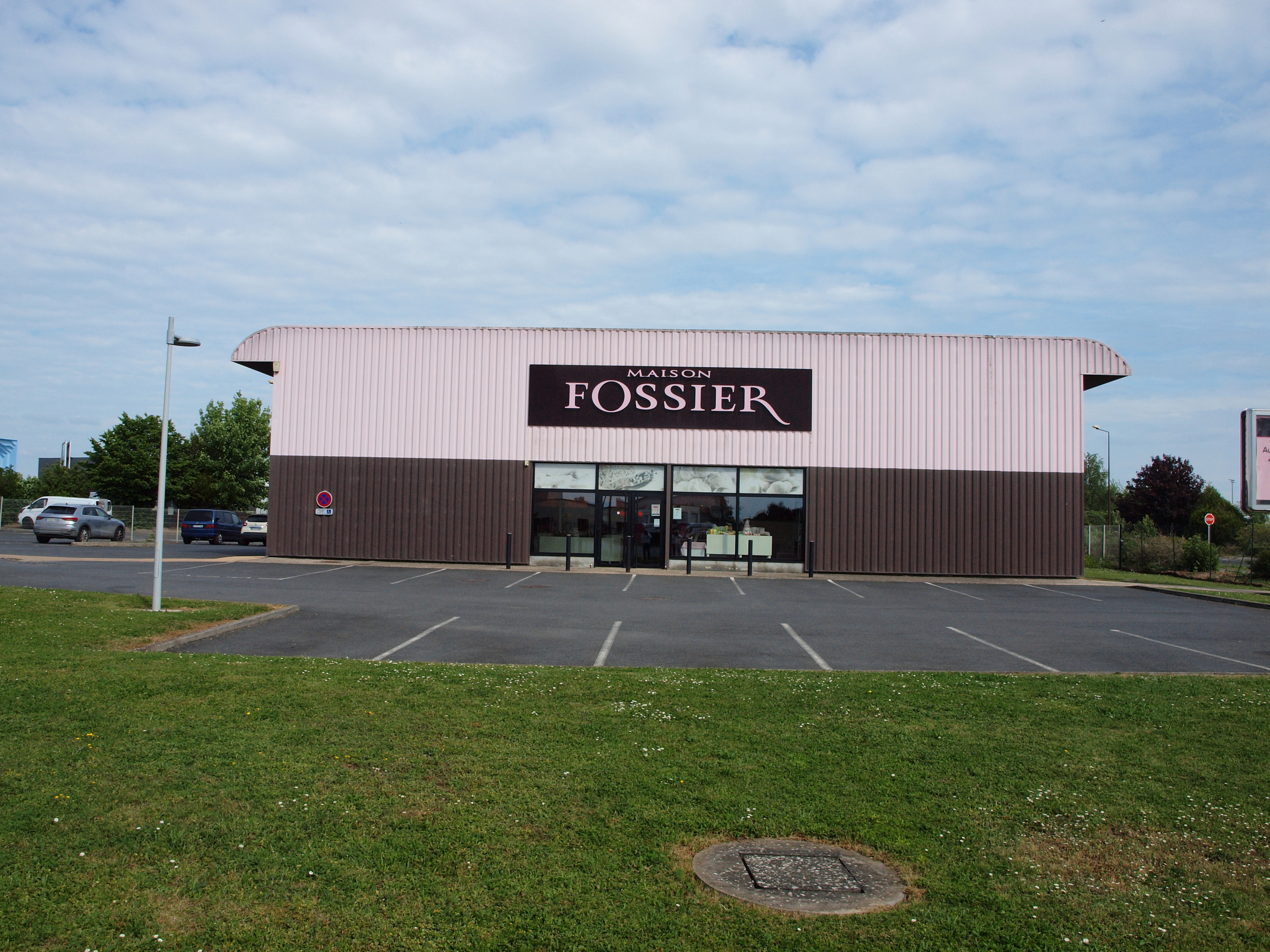
Shop in Châlons-en-Champagne

However, during the end of the 20th century, the house, which had about twenty employees, had to face three bankruptcy filings and the threat of compulsory liquidation due to a structure in bad shape, significant losses and insufficient turnover. In 1996, Charles de Fougeroux, who had already taken over the reins of the Rémoise Biscuiterie two years earlier, bought the oldest biscuit factory in France and merged them. The company moves outside the city center, the construction of new buildings will have cost one year of turnover. As far as production is concerned, the entrepreneur is committed to reinventing "old products that have been forgotten", such as gingerbread.

In 2020, The Breton group Galapagos Gourmet bought a stake in Biscuits Fossier. In April 2021, Galapagos announced the acquisition of Biscuits Fossier.

== Products ==
- Biscuit rose de Reims
