= Mars Muffin =

Baked good item

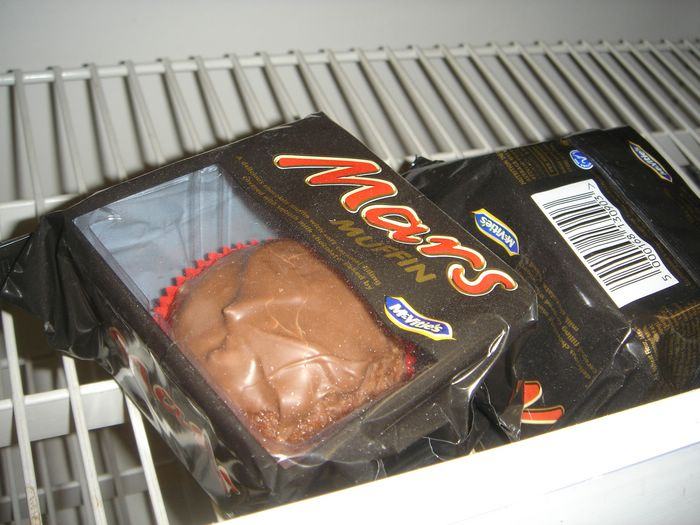
Two Mars Muffins in packaging

A Mars Muffin is a baked goods item produced by McVitie's and marketed in the United Kingdom. It is a muffin covered in Mars Bar style chocolate, partly filled with caramel, with caramel flavour cake.
