= Club (biscuit) =

Irish chocolate biscuit

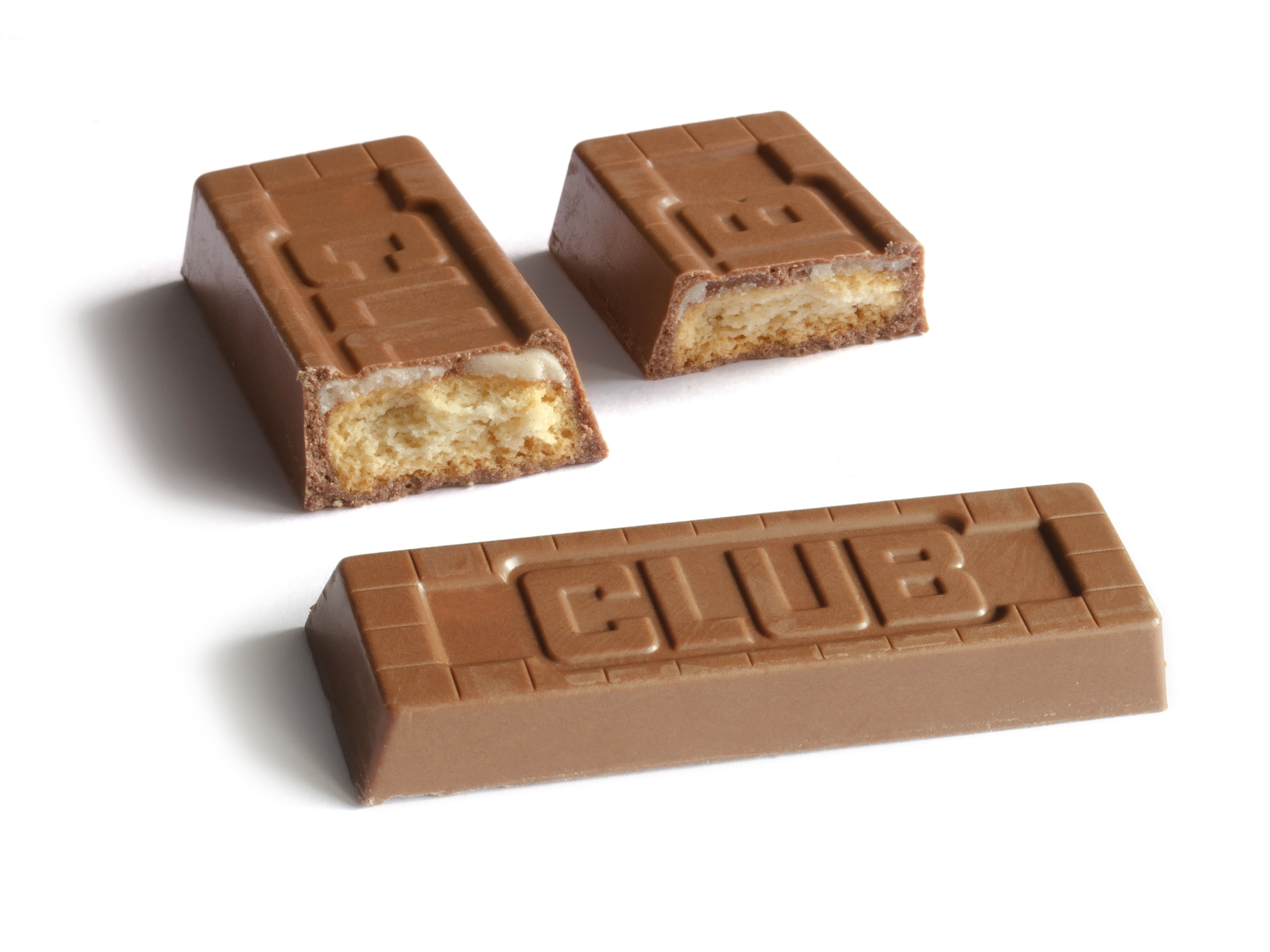
McVitie's-branded Club mint biscuit as sold on the UK market in 2017. A thin layer of "mint flavoured cream" can be seen on the inside of the biscuit.

Club is a range of biscuits, sold in the Republic of Ireland under the Jacob's brand name and in the United Kingdom under McVitie's.

== Origins ==
W & R Jacob and Company started producing the "Club Milk" biscuit in Dublin just before the outbreak of World War I. It became a popular brand across Ireland. The confection consisted of two rectangular Marie biscuits forming a filled sandwich using a cocoa cream, then covered in thick milk chocolate. Each bar was wrapped in foil, and then further wrapped in a paper outer wrapping.

== Name ==
Jacob's originally used images of playing cards from the Club suit to illustrate and to advertise the new biscuit. The "Club" name was therefore a reference to this suit.

== Development in Great Britain ==
It is unclear exactly when Club Milk biscuits were first imported to England, perhaps beginning informally owing to the trade route between Ireland and the English port of Liverpool. Jacob's had already established a factory in Liverpool in 1914, and subsequently began producing the Club Milk there.

In 1970 the Irish and British parts of the Jacob's company split into two firms. The Club biscuit had by this time become popular throughout Great Britain, and was marketed in five varieties. The original Club Milk (made with milk chocolate) was joined by a Club Plain (made with plain chocolate). The term "Club" was expanded for this new product, with a golf ball used to illustrate the wrapper, rather than the Club suit of cards. Two flavoured versions, Club Orange and Club Mint, were made by adding flavoring to the cocoa cream. The Club Fruit variant included raisins in the cocoa cream between the two biscuits. A further Club Honeycomb variety followed.

In the 1990s there was a range called Jacob's Club Class 3 versions with a television advert "Rhino Swan Lake".

During the late 2000s and early 2010s came Jacob's Club Cake bars.

From the mid-1970s into the 1990s Jacob's used the advertising slogan "If you like a lot of chocolate on your biscuit, join our Club". This was set to music, and used as a theme in television advertising campaigns during these same decades. In 2012 the jingle was voted by a sample of British adults to be "the seventh catchiest jingle of all time". Following a reduction of the chocolate content in the coating, the slogan was changed in 2025 to "If you like a lot of biscuit in your break, join our Club".

== Changes of ownership ==
=== Danone ===
In the mid-1990s both the Irish and British Jacob's companies were acquired by French-owned Groupe Danone who redesigned both the biscuit and the packaging. The two biscuits held together by cocoa cream were replaced with a single biscuit, topped with cocoa cream. The real chocolate exterior was replaced with a thinner layer of chocolate-based coating. The original milk and plain biscuits were discontinued, whilst the flavoured varieties were repackaged in cellophane flow pack.

=== United Biscuits ===
In September 2004 the Jacob's brand was sold by Danone to British-based United Biscuits, who restored some of the traditional elements of the Club biscuit, including the two-layer packaging, with an inner foil wrapper and an outer paper wrapper. At present they have not returned to the double-biscuit structure of the bar itself. The Irish part of the company was sold to Fruitfield Foods, to form Jacob Fruitfield Food Group, which has led to legal battles over the use of the Jacob's brand name.

From 2013 United Biscuits rebranded the product as McVities Club, using the Jacob's brand for savoury biscuits and McVities for sweet products.

== UK variations ==
Name	Wrapper colour	Wrapper symbol	Notes
Club Milk	Red	Club suit symbol	The original biscuit. .Now discontinued
Club Plain	Mid green	Golf ball	The original biscuit, but plain chocolate. Now discontinued.
Club Orange	Orange	Orange with leaves	Long-term flavour option, still in production.
Club Fruit	Purple	Grapes with vine leaves	Now discontinued
Club Mint	Dark green	Mint leaves	Long-term flavour option, still in production.
Club Coffee	Mid brown	Coffee cup & saucer	Launched in the 1980s. Now discontinued.
Club Wafer	Dark blue	Bitten corner of bar	Launched in the 1980s. Now discontinued.
Club Chocolate	Blue	Cocoa beans	Launched in the 1990s. Now discontinued.
Club Coconut	Light blue	Halved coconut	Launched in the 1990s. Now discontinued.
Club Honeycomb	Yellow	Rippled honey	Launched in 2012. Now discontinued.
Club Salted Caramel	Light blue		Launched in 2022.

== Irish production resumed ==
Without resolution of the dispute between United Biscuits (UK) and Fruitfield (Ireland) over the use of the Jacob's brand, the Irish company resumed production of the Club Milk bar. It returned to the original pattern of two biscuits joined by cocoa cream, and a thick covering of milk chocolate. Plain and wafer versions have also been produced. These products are available in the Republic of Ireland. The Irish company makes reference to the UK version of the biscuit in its promotion of the Irish Club Milk, by stating "forget any poor imitations", before outlining the features of the biscuit as now produced in Ireland.

There were limited editions of Club Orange, Club Mint some years. There is also a Wafer version called Choc Wafer at a phase during the late 1980s and early 1990s. In 2019 a new version called Club Chunky was launched.

In the 1970s there was a TV advert with a bishop that used the popular jingle Club Milk is "Best After All".

Between 1983 and 1994 a similar series of TV adverts using the slogan "If you're going to have a cuppa, have a Club" was used. But in 1995 a similar song was used with cuppa dropped the new jingle song was called "You to have a Club".

In the late 1990s the Andy Williams song "Music to Watch Girls By" was used.

In 2006 the last television advertisement was "Some kind of Wonder full" a version used for most of their Biscuits.

== Irish variations ==
Name	Wrapper colour	Wrapper symbol	Notes
Club Milk	Yellow	Club suit symbol	The original biscuit.
Club Plain	Mid green	Golf ball	The original biscuit, but plain chocolate. Now discontinued.
Club Orange	Orange	Orange with leaves	Long-term flavour option, still in production.
Club Fruit	Purple	Grapes with vine leaves	Long-term flavour option, still in production.
Club Mint	Light green	Mint leaves	Long-term flavour option, still in production.
Club Coffee	Mid brown	Coffee cup & saucer	Launched in the 1980s. Now discontinued.
Club Wafer	Dark blue	Bitten corner of bar	Launched in the 1980s. Now discontinued.
Club Chocolate	Blue	Cocoa beans	Launched in the 1990s. Now discontinued.
Club Honeycomb	Gold	Rippled honey	Launched in 2012.

== See also ==
- List of chocolate-covered foods
