= Alquería (company) =

Colombian dairy company

Productos Naturales de la Sabana S.A.S.

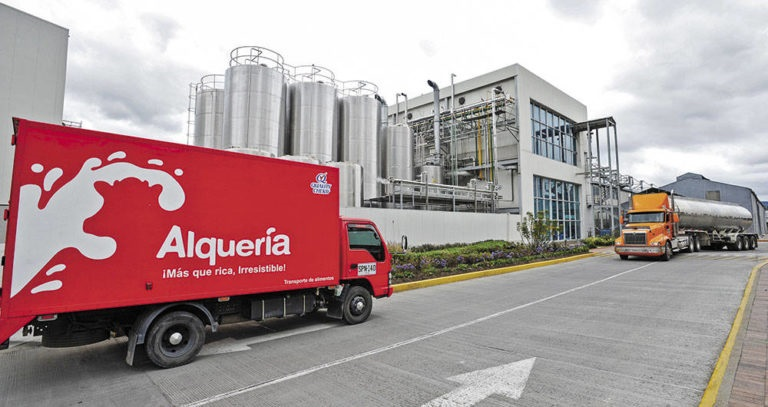
- Type: Private
- Industry: Dairy
- Founded: 1958; 68 years ago in Rionegro, Colombia
- Founder: Jorge Cavelier Jiménez; Enrique Cavelier Gaviria
- Headquarters: Cajicá, Colombia
- Products: Dairy products, food processing
- Website: www.alqueria.com.co

Productos Naturales de la Sabana S.A.S., doing business as Alquería, is a Colombian company that produces food, especially dairy products and beverages. Founded between 1958 and 1959, it currently has 7 processing plants and 21 distribution centers throughout the country, making it one of the private companies with the highest purchase of milk and dairy products in Colombia. Alquería is a Spanish term that means "country house", it symbolizes the fresh products that originate from it.
