= Square Pie =

British food brand

- Company type: Privately held company
- Industry: Food retail
- Founded: 2001, London
- Headquarters: Crewe, Cheshire
- Key people: Luke Morgan (CEO)
- Products: Pies
- Owner: Beat Foods Ltd
- Parent: Beat Foods Ltd
- Divisions: Grocery Wholesale
- Website: www.squarepie.com

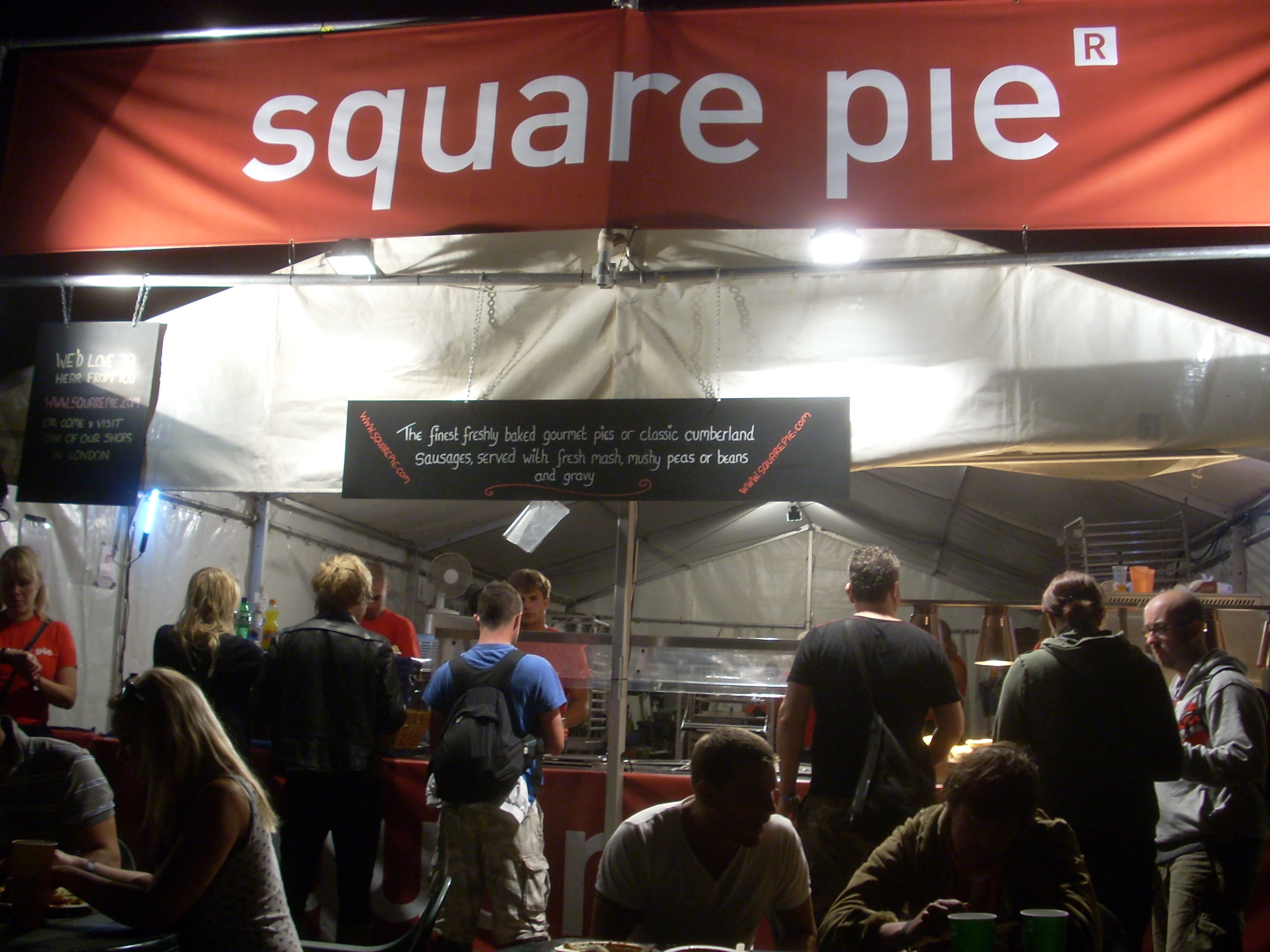
Square pie, 2009

Square Pie is a British food brand founded in Spitalfields, east London, which specialises in handmade pies.

== History ==
It was founded in 2001, with the first outlet, "The Square Pie Company", being opened in Spitalfields Market in November of that year. After the success of this shop, and after expanding sales by supplying London venues such as The Social and The Lock Tavern and running a stall at Glastonbury, Square Pie opened a concession in Selfridges food hall in London in 2003. A third outlet was opened at Canary Wharf in June 2004 to be followed by sites at The Brunswick Centre in Russell Square, Heathrow Terminal 1, Lord's Cricket Ground and Twickenham. Square Pie went on to have outlets in Westfield White City, The O2, Birmingham Grand Central, Westfield Stratford City and a fusion brand Square and Co outlet in Bluewater.

The Square Pie brand was acquired in February 2018 by Beat Foods Ltd following Square Pie Limited entering administration due to the failure of its restaurant business. Beat Foods Ltd continue to produce Square Pie branded products for the Wholesale and Grocery Markets.

== Retail ==
In 2007, Sainsbury's launched a Square Pie range across 71 of its stores raising to over 500 stores. As with those produced for Square Pies' outlets, the pies in this "Take Me Home and Bake Me" range are handmade, using only natural ingredients, with "clean and simple" packaging designed to reflect Square Pie's image as an "honest British food brand" – Square Pie outlets similarly use brown-board boxes as food containers. Following its successful launch into Sainsburys, Square Pie launched into other retail outlets such as Ocado, Tesco, Coop Food and Waitrose.

== Specialities ==
Among the over 116 different types of pies the company made between 2001 and 2006, Square Pie has produced tie-ins to sports championships, making a "humble pie" – kangaroo meat, red onion, field mushroom and Merlot – to mark Australia's loss at the 2003 Rugby World Cup, and running a "Pie World Cup" during the 2006 FIFA World Cup (won by the Senegalese Chicken Yasser). It also launched a pie branded with the London 2012 logo in 2004, in support of London's (successful) bid to host the Olympic Games in 2012.
