= PJ's Smoothies =

Drink brand

PJ's Smoothies was a brand of smoothies produced by parent company Copella, who produce fruit juices. In turn, Copella is owned by PepsiCo.

== History ==
PJ's Smoothies was established in 1994 by founders Harry Cragoe, Patrick Folkes and David Clancy. PJ's Smoothies was the original UK smoothie. In 1994, PJ's Smoothies was originally marketed as "Pete & Johnny's", but there was never anyone actually called Pete or Johnny. This seems to be contradicted by the following article from the evening standard suggesting that Peter Dubens was the Pete...

In 2003, it became the first to launch a kids' smoothie, 'Frooties', and in the same year made its television debut (the first smoothie brand to appear on UK TV) as the sponsor of reality game show, Survivor.

=== Purchase by PepsiCo and Discontinuation ===
PepsiCo bought the PJ's Smoothies brand in 2005 for £20 million.

In 2007, PJ's Smoothies had lost its dominance in the marketplace to Innocent Smoothies who now has an 80% market share. In 2007, Landor Associates redesigned PJ's Smoothies logo and packaging. Landor also handled PJ's first rebranding in 2006.

At the beginning of 2008, PepsiCo announced that it was cutting the cost of PJ's Smoothies by 30% and reducing the size of the range by half to attract new customers to the smoothie market. Later on in 2008, PepsiCo announced that it was scrapping the PJ's Smoothies brand to focus more on the Tropicana brand.

== Products ==
PJ's Smoothies were available in seven flavours; Orange, Mandarin & Guava, Strawberry, Apple & Rhubarb, Apple, Kiwi and Limes and Strawberry & Banana. PJ's Smoothies came in 250ml bottles and 1 litre bottles.
