= Beerenberg Farm =

Australian producer of jams, condiments and sauces

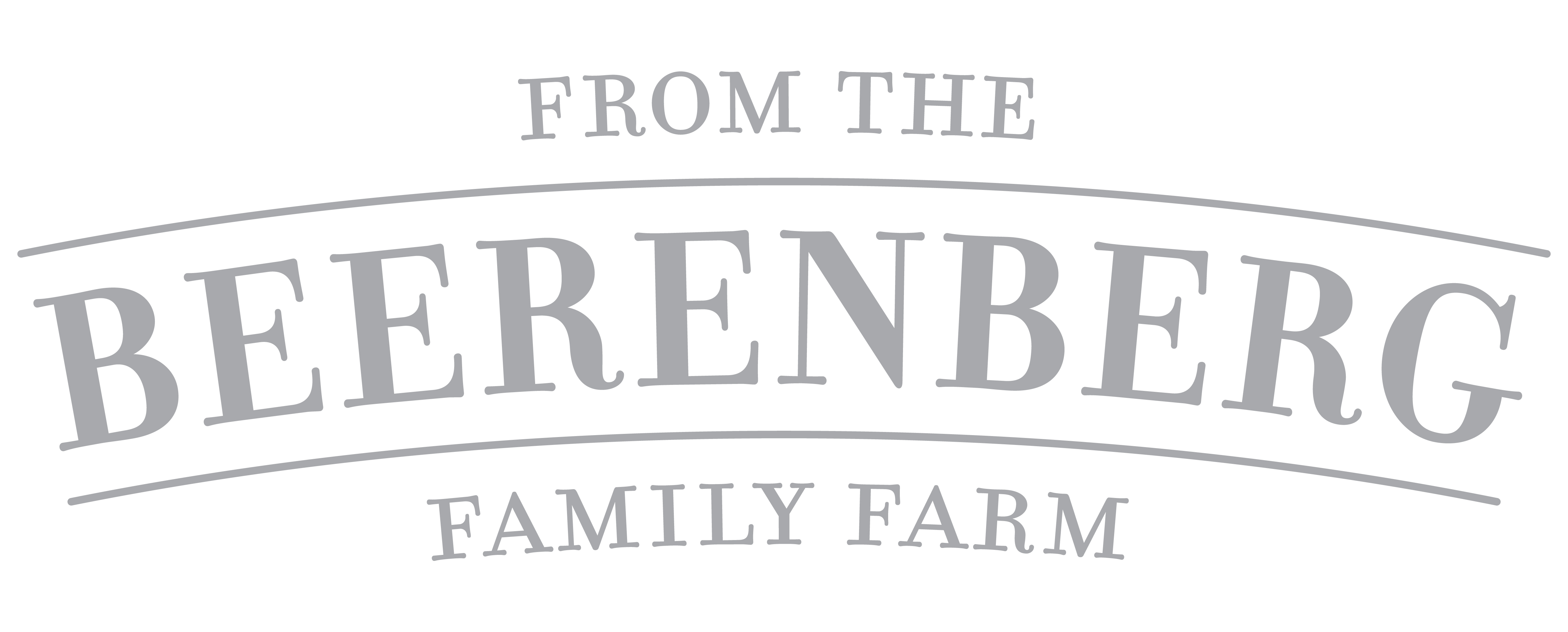

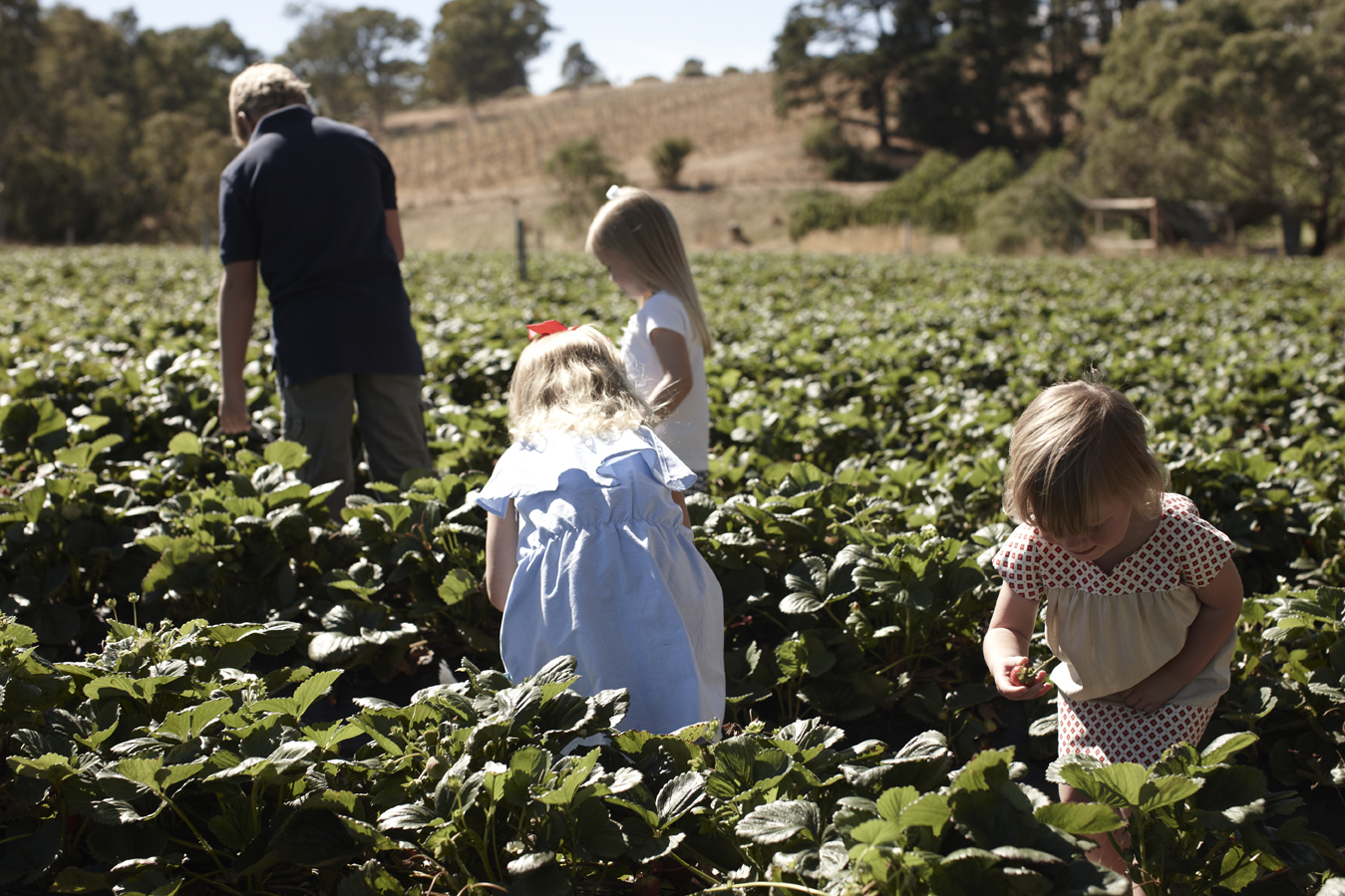
- A family picking strawberries at Beerenberg Farm
- Type: Privately held company
- Industry: Manufacturing and Retail
- Founded: 1839; 187 years ago
- Headquarters: Hahndorf, South Australia, Australia
- Key people: Anthony Paech - Managing Director
- Products: Jams and preserves
- Owner: Paech family
- Number of employees: 85 (2018)
- Website: beerenberg.com.au

Beerenberg Farm is an Australian producer of jams, condiments, sauces and dressings, located in Hahndorf in the Adelaide Hills of South Australia. The company premises are a tourist attraction on the state's food-and-wine trail, and have gained an international reputation due to the use of its portion-sized products in Australian and international airlines and hotels.

== History ==
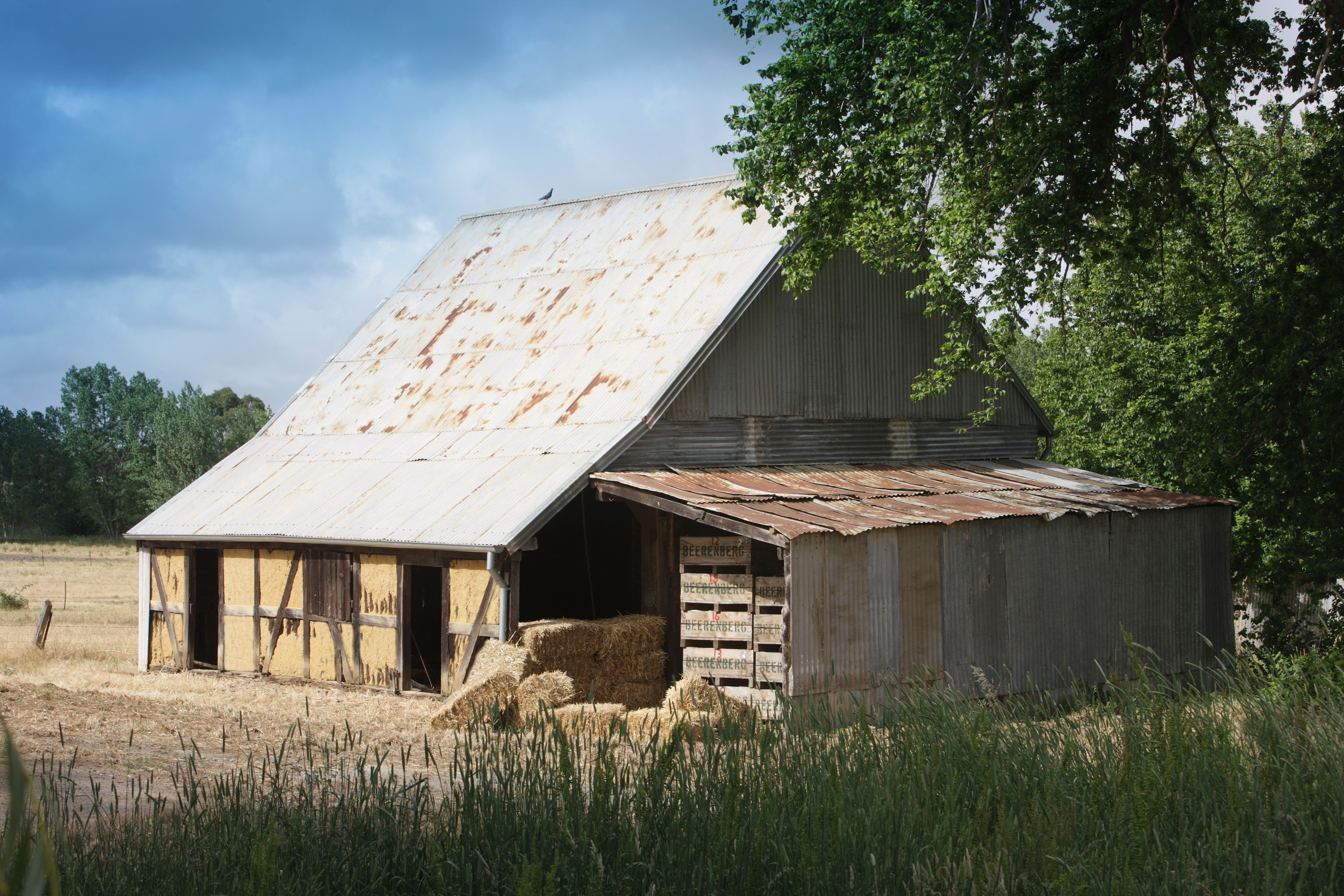
pre-1850 barn

The original farm was founded in 1839 by German migrant Johann George Paech, as a dairy farm. The Beerenberg Barn that appeared on the original labels was built sometime between 1845 and 1850. The construction is red gum framework put together with mortise and tenon joints secured with wooden pins, in 1990 the barn was classified by the National Trust as Historic.

Grant Paech grew up on what was then a dairy farm run by his father Hermann Christian Paech. When Grant left school he studied at Roseworthy Agricultural College and then joined his father working on the dairy farm. In the winter of 1969 Hermann became sick and on Christmas Eve 1969 he died. Grant and his wife Carol took over the running of the farm and renamed it "Beerenberg", meaning Berry on the Hill in German.

The first Beerenberg strawberries had been planted in 1967 around Grant's house and were followed two years later in 1969, by the first commercial quantity, over 0.5 acres (0.20 ha). In the early 1970s the fruit was sold at the Adelaide East End Wholesale Market as well as at the farm shop and the Adelaide Central Market. In the 1970s the first jam was produced and this was originally packed and sold in cream cartons until a glass supply contract was secured.

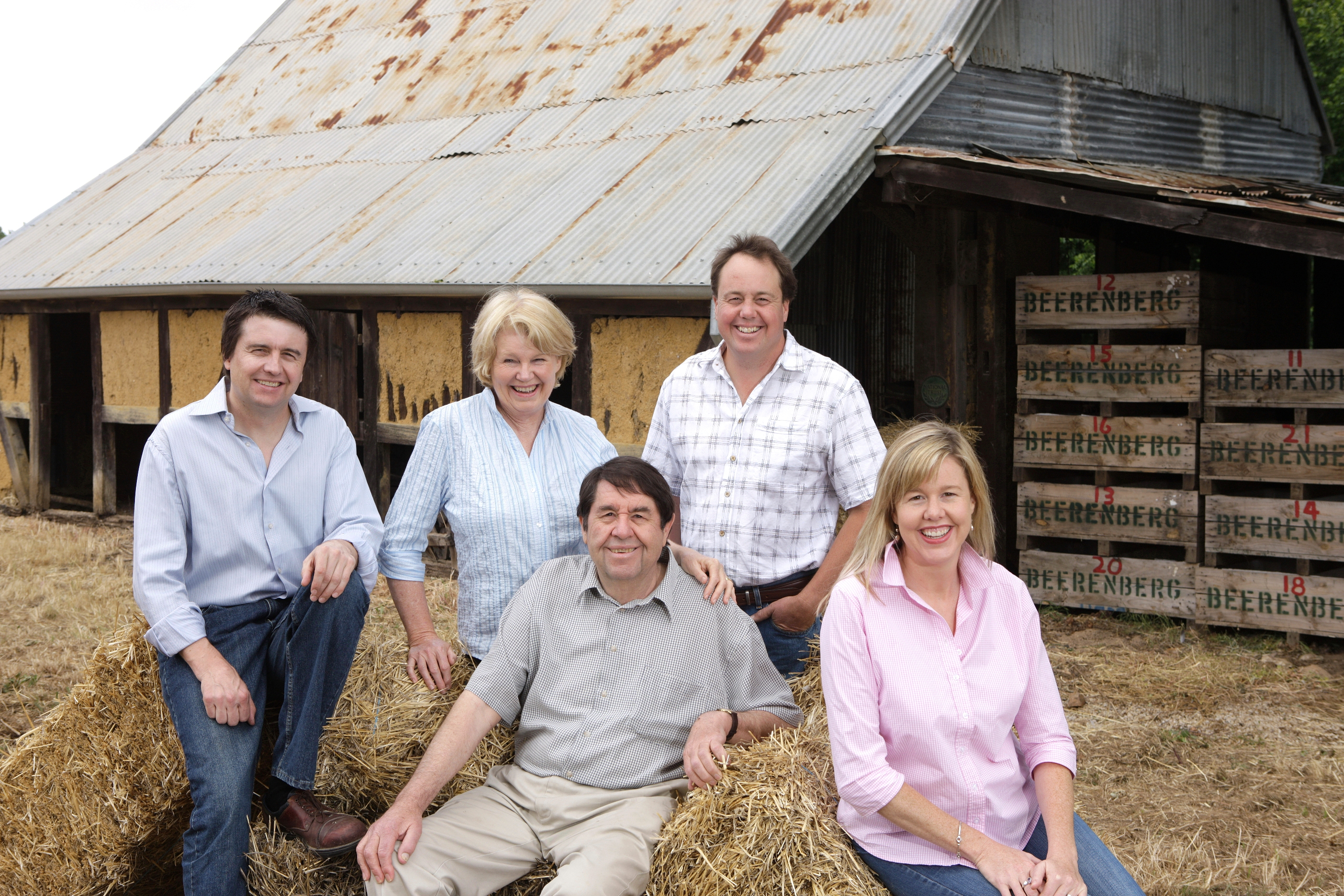
The Paech Family, Anthony, Carol, Robert, Grant and Sally

In 1998 Anthony Paech, son of Grant and sixth generation Paech to run the farm, became Managing Director of Beerenberg. He runs the business along with his siblings Robert and Sally as Farm and Marketing Managers respectively, Carol (their mother) is also still actively involved in the family business. The company operates in a deliberate way as a multi-generational family business, with a formal constitution, family council and external Advisory Board Members. Beerenberg has received a South Australian Premier's Food Award for its contribution to horticulture and the food industry as well as several other food and business awards.

The Paech family has established The Beerenberg Foundation, to assist with maintaining the historic character of the town of Hahndorf.

== Products ==
The flagship product, Beerenberg Strawberry Jam is made from strawberries grown and picked from the Beerenberg Farm.

The company also produces a range of over 50 other products including mustards, marmalades, chutneys, sauces and marinades, pickles, dressings, dessert toppings and olive oil all made in small batches, using traditional recipes with no added artificial flavourings, colours or preservatives. In 2007 Beerenberg launched a new product in collaboration with another iconic South Australian family-owned business, Coopers Brewery, Beerenberg Coopers Ale Barbeque Sauce.

== International exports and major contracts ==
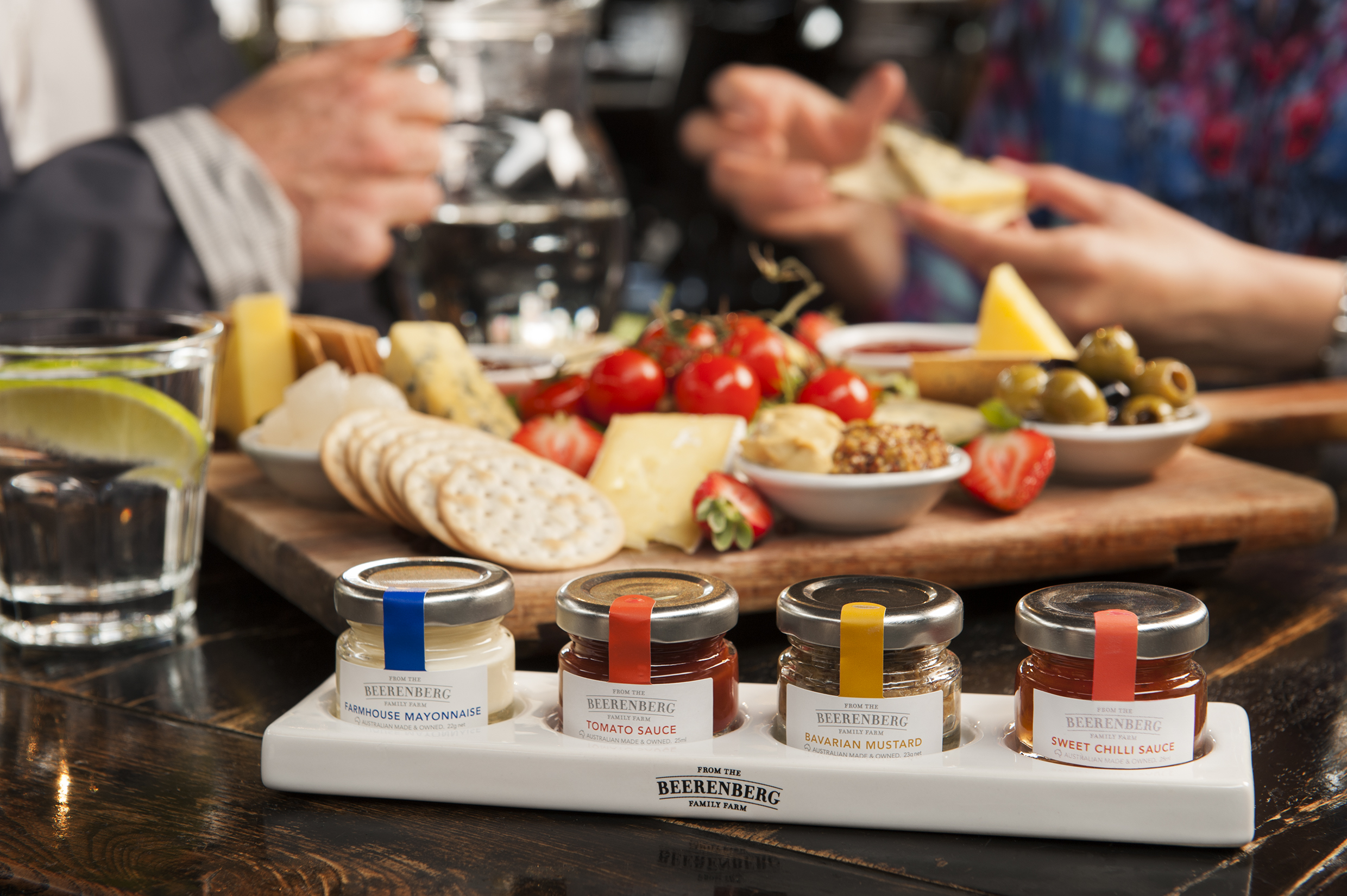
Sampler of four miniature jars

In 1987, Beerenberg pioneered the concept of portion serves (miniature jars) for its premium quality jams and preserves, in order to fulfil a contract with Qantas, Australia's flagship airline, to cater for their first and business class meals.

In 2002, the company exported a first shipment of 40,000 miniature jars of jam to China which were used as part of the Hong Kong-based Dragonair airline's food service.

In 1993, small foil packs were launched to meet growing demand from the hotel and tourism markets and this led to Beerenberg controlling more than 70 per cent of this sector in Australia and large Asian market.

The company is one of the best-known brands in the Asia-Pacific region's hotel industry. Currently portion size jars and foil packs form a large part of Beerenberg's business, with 25 million foil pack portion sizes and 11 million portion size jars made each year. Forty per cent of these stay in Australia.

== Innovation ==
In March 2009 Beerenberg re-launched its website with a new feature – the 'Provenance Pathway' – which enables its customers to trace the passage of their purchased product from 'soil to shelf'. Customers can enter the barcode from their Beerenberg jar to find out further information about the product including a map of where the main ingredients were grown, the date the product was made and even the name of the cook.

In June 2018 Beerenberg Farm completed an upgrade to its manufacturing facility and head office. The expanded factory includes two new kettles imported from the United Kingdom. It doubled the production capacity to over 15 tonnes (60,000 bottles) per 8-hour shift with improved quality control.

== Tourist attractions ==
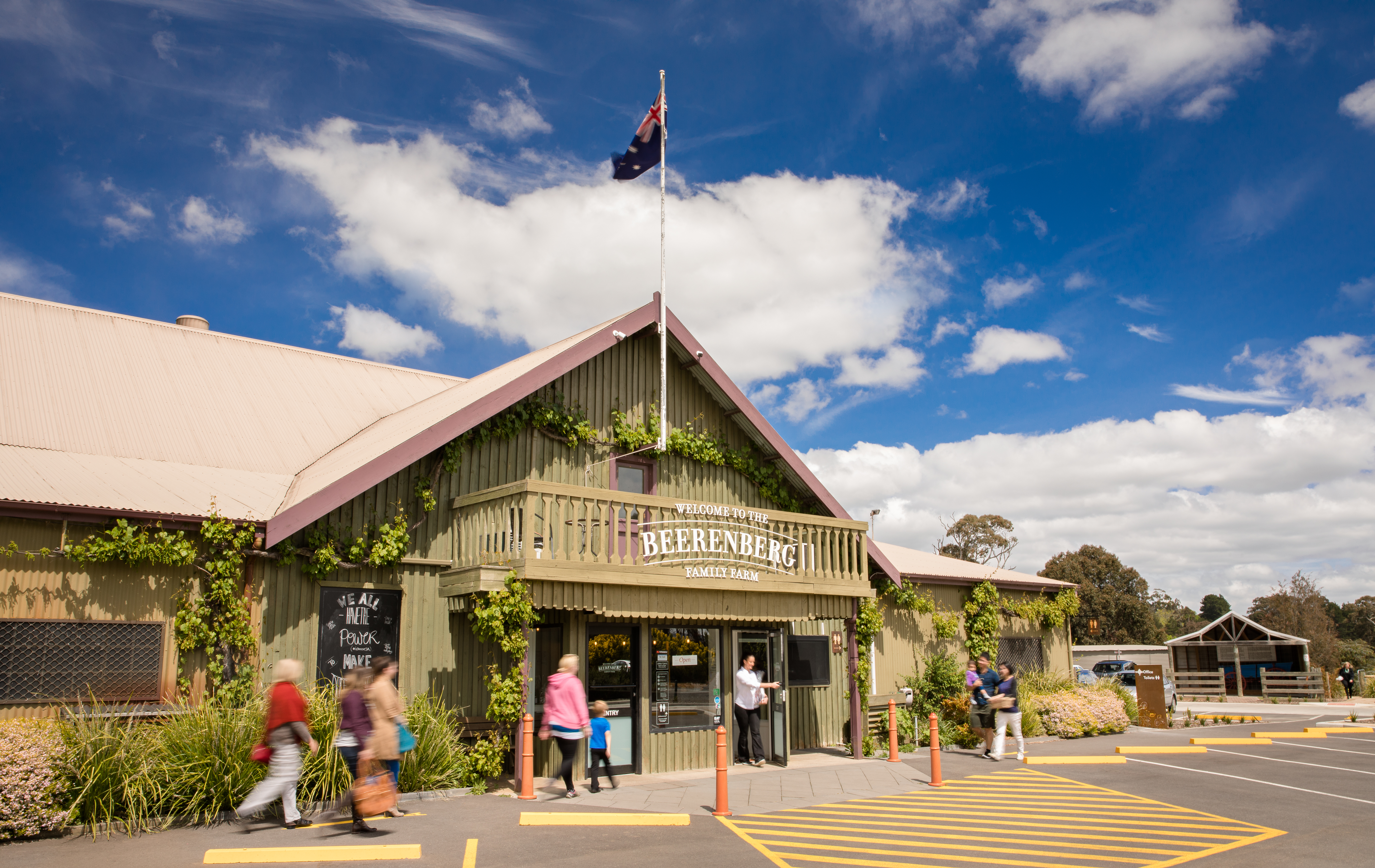
Beerenberg Farm Shop

The Beerenberg Farm is a "major tourist attraction" amongst the breweries and wineries in the German-influenced Hahndorf region. Visitors can pick their own strawberries (from October to May), as well as visiting the on-site jam kitchen and farm shop.

== See also ==
- List of South Australian manufacturing businesses
- South Australian food and drink
