= Artos (drink) =

Soft drink in India

Artos Soft Drink
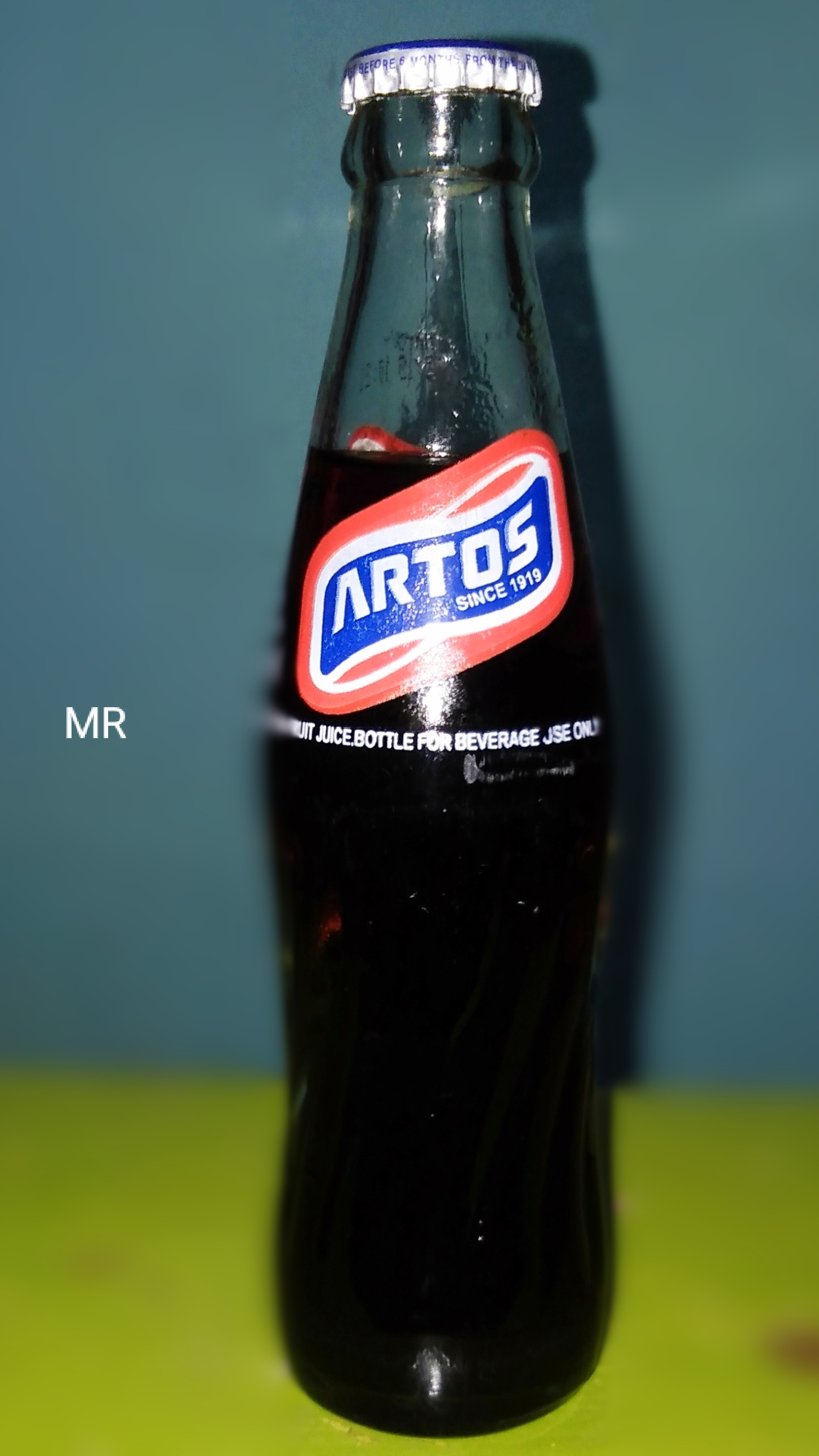
- since 1919
- Type: Soft Drink
- Origin: India, Ramachandrapuram, East Godavari, Andhra Pradesh
- Introduced: 1919; 107 years ago
- Flavour: Lemon, orange, grape, soda etc;
- Variants: Grape, Orange, Prince, Lemon and Pearl Soda
- Website: www.artos.in

Artos is a regional soft drink and the first aerated soft drink in the state of Andhra Pradesh. It was first named as "Ramachandra Raju soft drinks" and later renamed as "A.R Raju Tonics" and later converted into Artos. It was originated in Ramachandrapuram in East Godavari district, Andhra Pradesh. At first, Ramachandra Raju bought a soda machine from British collectorate but he did not know how to use it. Later, he came to Visakhapatnam with the machine and meet a person in Vizag Port and he helped the machine with new parts and also told how to use it and he returned to Ramachandrapuram and started marketing it as a soda drink in 1912. At first, local people scared to drink due to gaseous content or some myths but after observing British soldiers consuming it they started. In 1919, it was officially made as a drink and the required sugars, gas and flavours are imported from Europe. But during the 2nd World War, the imports had stopped and many industries in India halted. But Artos continued its production using the flavours taken from fruits. Many international companies offers franchises but Artos never stopped. In 2019, it has completed 100 years and Artos was growing furthermore in Andhra Pradesh.

== History ==
Artos was established in 1919 by Adduri Ramachandra Raju and Adduri Jagannadha Raju in Ramachandrapuram, East Godavari with a soda machine procured from the British. In the beginning, people avoided the drink as it was seen as a devil's bottle and its consumption by the British soldiers made it popular during World War-II.

== Flavours ==
It is available in Grape, Lemon, Orange, Gingeera, Lemon Salt Soda, Zibb Gluco, Guava, Apple and soda flavours.

== See also ==
- List of soft drinks by country
