= Morrie Yohai =

American businessman (1920–2010)

Morrie Robert Yohai (pronounced yo-high; March 4, 1920 – July 27, 2010) was an American food company executive best known for his creation of Cheez Doodles, a cylindrical baked cornmeal puff most often with a cheddar cheese flavor.

Yohai was born on March 4, 1920, in Harlem to Jewish immigrants from Turkey and grew up in the Bronx. He earned his undergraduate degree in 1941 from the Wharton School of the University of Pennsylvania. He worked for Grumman Aircraft after graduating from college and enlisted in the United States Navy during World War II. He pursued flight training, assuming that since he knew how to build planes he would know how to fly them. He was shifted to the United States Marine Corps and piloted planes in the South Pacific.

Yohai was the president of Old London Foods, a food products company originally established in the 1920s by two men, Robert J. Yohai and Robert A. Yohai (his father and his cousin), as King Kone. The company had manufactured ice cream cones and would later produce cheese crackers, popcorn and Melba toast. The company was looking for a new snack in the 1950s and had a machine that could extrude cornmeal under pressure through a narrow hole that would be cut to three-inch lengths by a blade. Baked with orange cheddar cheese and flavorings, Yohai gave them the name "Cheez Doodles". The name came to him while he sat around the table with other employees sampling different alternatives for the cheese flavoring. In 1965, the company was bought out by Borden, which also made Cracker Jack and Drake's cakes. In April 1967, Yohai was named as group vice president at Borden Foods and as chairman of the firm's Old London Foods and Wise Potato Chips divisions. Yohai recalled that one of his responsibilities involved making decisions as to which tiny toys would be included as prizes in packages of Cracker Jack.

Yohai was proud of his association with Cheez Doodles, and fondly retained a photograph of Julia Child eating from a bag. Attending a 2004 display of a work by Sandy Skoglund at a Napa Valley museum depicting several life-size figures covered in Cheez Doodles, his wife proudly told the gathered guests that her husband had invented the product.

Yohai left Borden after the company relocated to Columbus, Ohio. He started teaching at the New York Institute of Technology and was chosen to serve as the associate dean of the college's school of management. In his later years Yohai became involved with Jewish mysticism and Torah study. An author of two books and 500 poems, he was one of the founders of the annual New York Sephardic Jewish Film Festival.

He was a resident of Kings Point, New York, where he lived in a luxurious home on Long Island Sound. His wife referred to it as "the house that Cheez Doodles bought". He died of cancer at age 90 at his home there on July 27, 2010. Surviving him were his wife, the former Phyllis Marcus whom he had married in 1947, a daughter, Babs, a son, Robbie, and a granddaughter, Jasmine Yohai.
