= Old London Foods =

American baked foods brand

- Formerly: King Kone Corp. (until 1960)
- Company type: Subsidiary
- Founders: Harry Tatosian; R. J. Yohai
- Key people: Morrie Yohai
- Brands: Cheez Doodles (formerly); Dipsy Doodles (formerly); Devonsheer; JJ Flats
- Parent: Borden (1965–1986); CPC International (1986–1997); Nonni Foods (2005–2013); B&G Foods (from 2013)

Old London Foods, a subsidiary of B&G Foods, is a company best known for its Melba toast products. Originally based in the Bronx and called the King Kone Corporation, the company changed its name to Old London Foods in May 1960 to match their best-known brand of food products, Old London, which had been in use for nearly 25 years.

== History ==
=== Foundation and early history ===
The company was founded as a manufacturer of food machinery by Harry Tatosian, who invented the machines, and Robert J. Yohai, vice president and sales manager. After a trip to London where they had installed automated baking machines for a client, Tatosian and Yohai decided to invest $4,000 to start manufacturing food themselves using their machines. Their first products were baked ice cream cones sold under the brand name "Old London" based on their recent experience in that city. The company was called the King Kone Corporation.

=== Growth and diversification ===
The company began producing one of its most notable products, Melba toast, in 1932 when it installed its first purpose-built Melba ovens. In the 1950s, company executive Morrie Yohai invented a cheese-flavored, baked cornmeal puff he named "Cheez Doodles" that became one of the company's most popular products in the Northeastern US.

The company acquired Dallas-based corn chip producer Circle D Foods, Inc. in 1959.

By 1960, King Kone's products were sold in 250,000 supermarkets and restaurants in the United States and its "Dipsy Doodles" brand of corn chips was the second-best selling corn chip in the country behind Fritos. King Kone's snack division also produced popcorn in caramel, cheese and unflavored varieties, and was the largest producer of popcorn for home consumption as of 1960. Manhattan's famed Sardi's restaurant included Old London crackers by name on the menu for its "executive weight watchers" meal.

The company changed its name from King Kone Corporation to Old London Foods in May 1960 to take advantage of customer awareness of their product brand label.

=== Acquisition ===
In 1965, the company was bought out by Borden, which added the Old London products to its portfolio of snack products that included Cracker Jack and Drake's Cakes. Ownership and production of the Cheez Doodles and Dipsy Doodles brands was transferred to Borden's Wise Foods potato chip division.

In 1986, Old London's remaining operations were acquired from Borden by CPC International for approximately $25 million (equivalent to $73.4 million in 2025). The new owner grouped Old London with its other baking acquisitions, Arnold Foods Company and S. B. Thomas, as the Best Foods Baking Group. In 1997, Old London was bought out from CPC by a group of managers backed by the private equity firm Dubilier & Company.

The company was acquired by Nonni Foods, makers of flatbread products, in 2005 for $70 million (equivalent to $115.4 million in 2025). Nonni Foods was acquired by Chipita and changed its name to Chipita America. By 2010 Old London's Old London and Devonsheer brands were sold in 90% of American supermarkets.

On October 31, 2012, B&G Foods, Inc. (NYSE: BGS) purchased Old London from Chipita America.

== Notable products ==
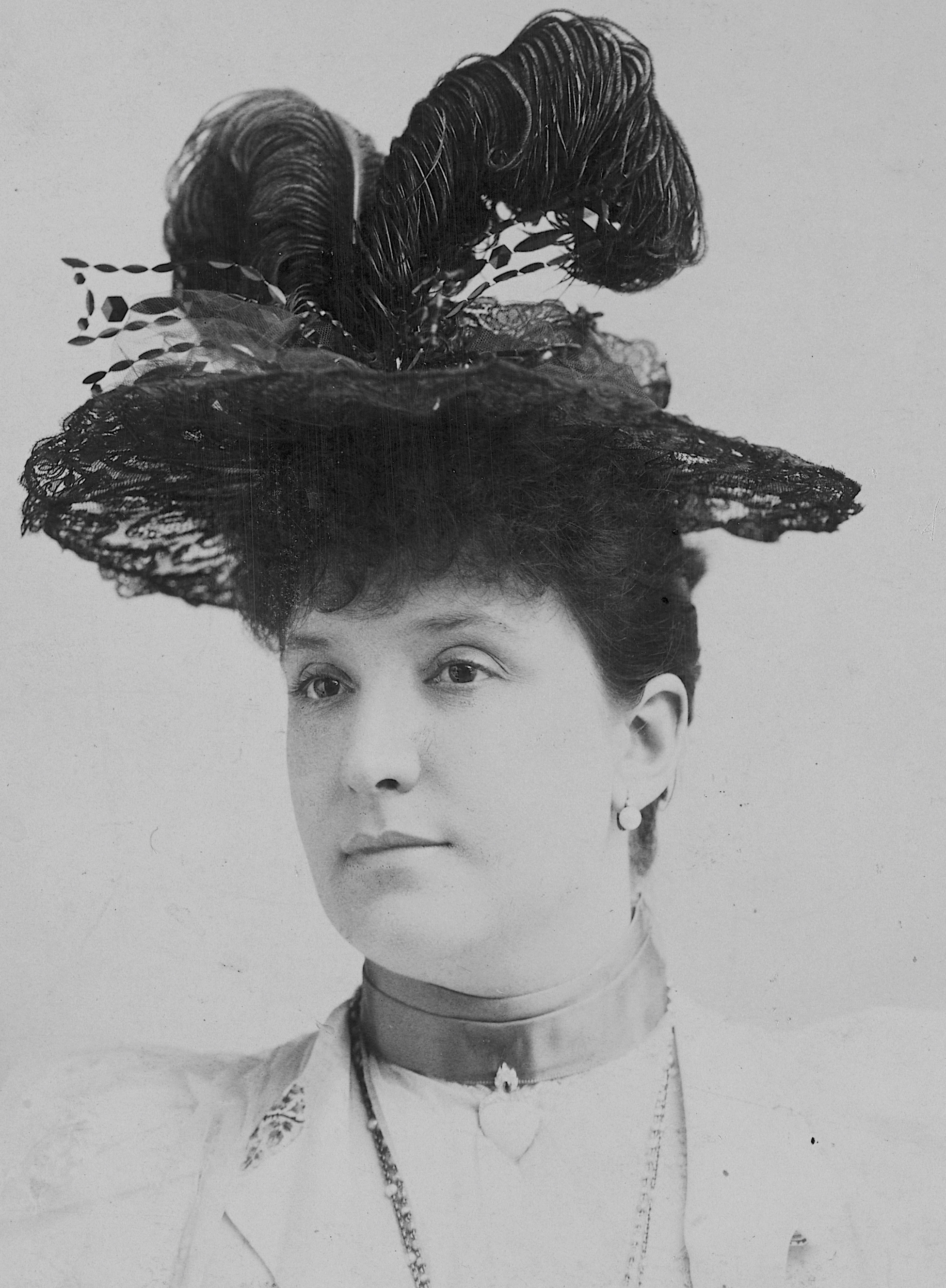
Nellie Melba

=== Melba toast ===
One of the company's oldest product successes was its line of Melba toast. Melba toast dates back to 1897, when Nellie Melba complained to chef Auguste Escoffier that her toasted bread was too thick. He gave her bread that had been toasted extremely thin and named it "Melba toast" after her. Old London began manufacturing Melba toast in 1932 after installing a purpose-built Melba oven. The product line originally consisted of packages of square-shaped toast for individual consumption but later variations included restaurant packs of toast and rounds.

After its acquisition of Old London in 2012, the Old London brand of Melba toast was owned and produced by B&G.

=== Cheez Doodles ===
The "Cheez Doodles" brand of cheese-flavored puffed cornmeal snack was invented in the 1950s by Old London executive Morrie Yohai. The company produced a machine that could extrude cornmeal under pressure through a narrow hole. The extruded cornmeal was then cut to 3-inch (76 mm) lengths by a blade and baked with orange cheddar cheese and flavorings. The name came to Yohai while he sat around the table with other employees sampling different alternatives for the cheese flavoring.

When Borden bought Old London in 1965, the Cheez Doodles brand and production were transferred to Borden's Wise Foods potato chip division. Wise continued to produce Cheez Doodles.

=== Dipsy Doodles ===
Dipsy Doodles were a brand of rippled corn chips produced by Old London starting in the 1950s. The chips were produced by extrusion, similar to the later Cheez Doodles, with cornmeal being extruded under pressure through a W-shaped opening. After acquiring corn chip producer Circle D Foods in 1959, Old London's "Dipsy Doodles" brand of corn chips became the second-best selling corn chip in the United States behind Fritos.

After Borden's 1965 acquisition of Old London, ownership and production of the Dipsy Doodles brand was transferred to Borden's Wise division which continued to produce Dipsy Doodles.

== Facilities ==
The company was long based on East 138th Street in a six-story building in the Bronx, where it ran two shifts year-round and added a third shift during the winter season. In 1968, it opened a bakery in Morris Park, Bronx.

The lack of open space in its Bronx factory meant that the toasted product had to be moved between floors for different production steps. To resolve this issue, the facility, which had employed 228 workers, was shut down in February 2010 and production was relocated to a much larger one in Yadkinville, North Carolina.

Chipita's sale of Old London to B&G included the Yadkinville manufacturing facility and its approximately 250 employees.
