= Leo Pearlstein =

American businessman (1920–2025)

Leo Pearlstein (October 5, 1920 – September 10, 2025) was an American businessman who was the founder and President of Lee & Associates, Inc., a public relations and advertising firm, which he opened in 1950. He ran the company with his partners, two of his sons, Howard and Frank Pearlstein, until it closed shop in 2013. He also founded and was Director of Western Research Kitchens, the food and beverage division of his agency, and his agency was named as one of the top agencies in the country that specialized in food and beverage clients. Pearlstein has been referred to as the "King of Culinary Public Relations".

== Life and career ==
Pearlstein received his Bachelor of Science Degree in Marketing from the School of Merchandising, College of Commerce, at the University of Southern California, where he received the Paul G. Hoffman Award, presented to the most outstanding marketing graduate.

He was on the team that invented the "Pop-Up" turkey timer and handled promotions for the California Turkey Advisory Board for over 25 years. His longest client representation was for Mrs. Cubbison's Foods, handling the company's marketing for 60 years.

Pearlstein had been very active in California agricultural commodities and generic food promotions, and has created and supervised programs for over 40 different advisory boards, trade associations and co-ops, as well as state and federally funded marketing groups. This includes industries such as almonds, apples, artichokes, asparagus, boysenberries, chives, corn, eggs, figs, grapefruit, papayas, peaches, pineapples, plums, prunes, seafood, tomatoes and turkeys.

Pearlstein was invited to participate in the first President's Council on Nutrition at the White House. He was a consultant for the American Culinary Federation as well as a member of the National Academy of Television Arts and Sciences.

Pearlstein wrote four books: Celebrity Stew, Recipes of the Stars, Mrs. Cubbison's Best Stuffing Cookbook, and Adventures in PR.

On October 26, 2023, 103-year-old Pearlstein received the 2023 Lifetime Achievement Award from PRSA-LA (Public Relations Society of America).

He was also a jazz drummer, and was believed to be one of the world's oldest living drummers. His son, David Bluefield, is also a jazz musician and regularly posted videos on his YouTube channel of Pearlstein drumming to various jazz pieces.

Pearlstein died on September 10, 2025, 25 days before his 105th birthday.
