= Robert Ehrlich (disambiguation) =

Robert Ehrlich may refer to:

- Bob Ehrlich (born 1957), American politician
- Robert Ehrlich (physicist), American physicist
- Robert Ehrlich (businessman), American entrepreneur
- Robert Ehrlich (musician), Northern Irish musician
