= Pirate's Booty =

American snack food brand developed and produced by Robert Ehrlich

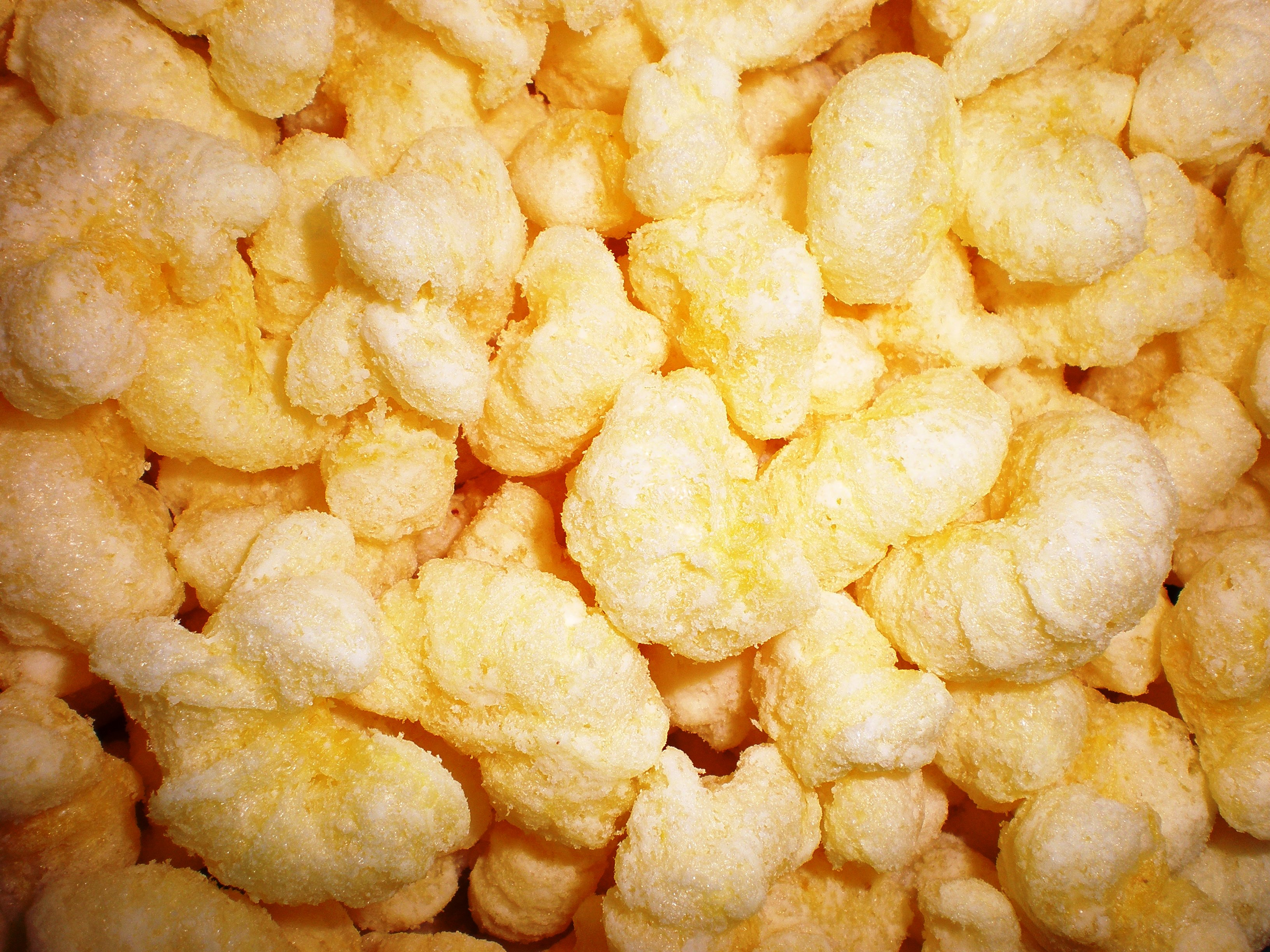
- Type: Puffcorn
- Inventor: Amplify Snack Brands; Pirate Brands
- Inception: 1987; 39 years ago
- Manufacturer: The Hershey Salty Snacks Company
- Available: Available
- Current supplier: The Hershey Salty Snacks Company
- Website: hersheyland.com/pirates-booty

Pirate's Booty is a puffed corn and rice snack food developed and produced in 1987 by Robert Ehrlich. B&G Foods acquired Robert's American Gourmet Food in June 2013. In 2018, B&G Foods sold the brands to The Hershey Company.

Ehrlich would often watch people purchasing cheese puffs in a local supermarket. The snack, Ehrlich explained, did not have "any real cheese in them... most of the ingredients you couldn't even pronounce." Ehrlich then went on to found a snack brand known as Vegan Rob's, which makes cheese puffs with no cheese in them.

== Ingredients ==
The snack is made with corn meal, rice, and cheddar cheese.

== Owner ==
Pirate Brands is owned and operated by the Hershey Salty Snacks Company, a Hershey company.

== Recall ==
On June 29, 2007, Robert's American Gourmet recalled their Veggie Booty brand snack food due to salmonella contamination.

== See also ==
- Cheese puffs
- Cheetos
- Cheez Doodles
- Robert's American Gourmet
