= Roseland, New Jersey =

Borough in Essex County, New Jersey, US

- Borough
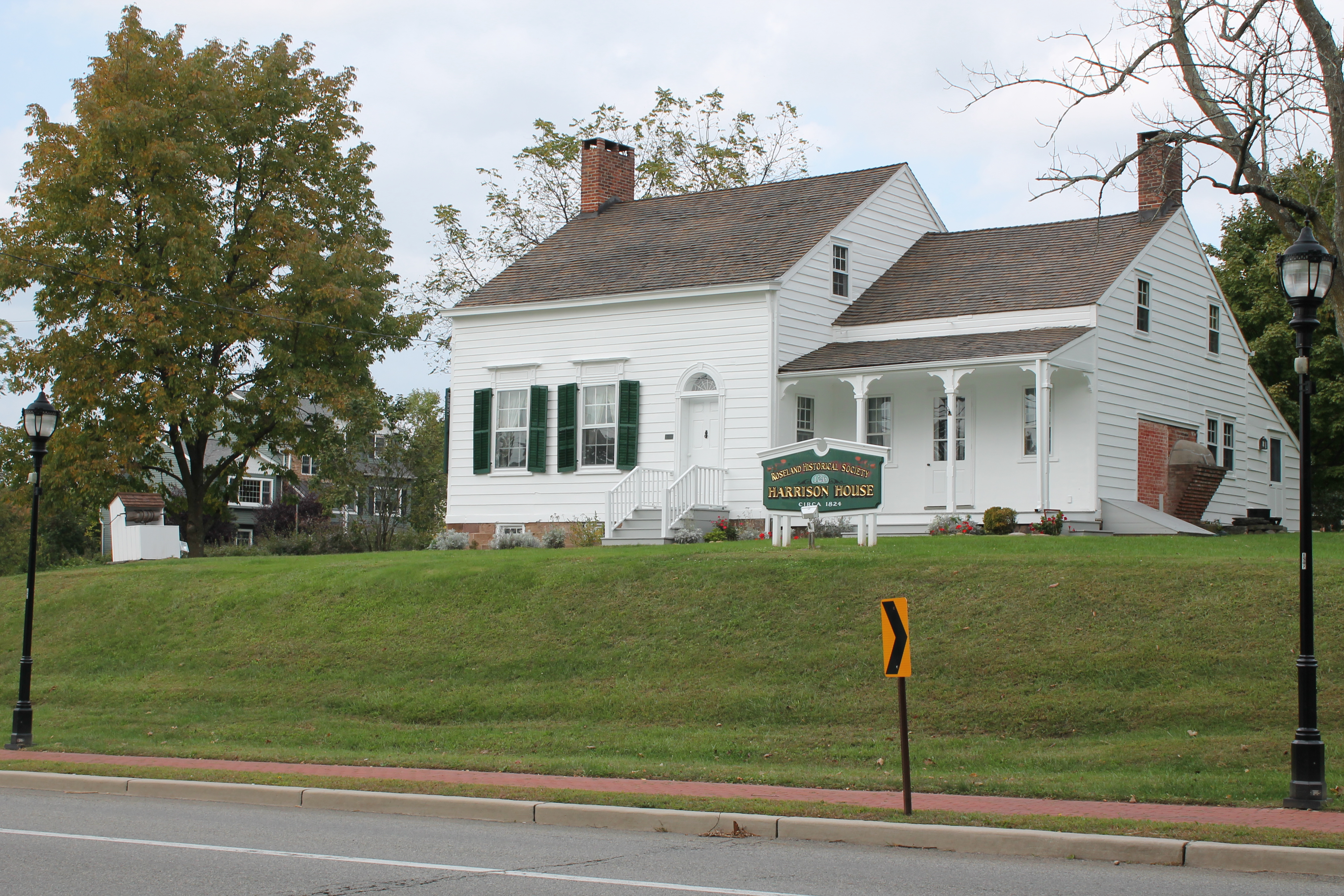
- The Williams-Harrison House is listed on the U.S. National Register of Historic Places

- Seal

- Location of Roseland in Essex County highlighted in red (right). Inset map: Location of Essex County in New Jersey highlighted in orange (left).

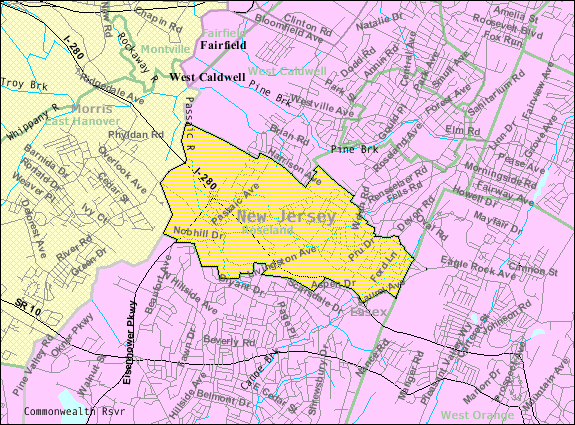
- Census Bureau map of Roseland, New Jersey

- Location in Essex County Location in New Jersey Location in the United States
- Coordinates: 40.821737°N 74.310147°W
- Country: United States
- State: New Jersey
- County: Essex
- Incorporated: April 10, 1908

Government
  - Type: Borough
  - Body: Borough Council
  - Mayor: James Spango (D, term ends December 31, 2026)
  - Administrator: Maureen Chumacas
  - Municipal clerk: Jock H. Watkins

Area
  - Total: 3.64 sq mi (9.43 km^{2})
  - Land: 3.62 sq mi (9.37 km^{2})
  - Water: 0.023 sq mi (0.06 km^{2}) 0.69%
  - Rank: 309th of 565 in state 12th of 22 in county
- Elevation: 239 ft (73 m)

Population (2020)
  - Total: 6,299
  - Estimate (2024): 6,370
  - Rank: 334th of 565 in state 21st of 22 in county
  - Density: 1,741/sq mi (672/km^{2})
  - Rank: 315th of 565 in state 20th of 22 in county
- Demonym: Roselandite
- Time zone: UTC−05:00 (Eastern (EST))
  - Summer (DST): UTC−04:00 (Eastern (EDT))
- ZIP Code: 07068
- Area code: 973
- FIPS code: 3401364590
- GNIS feature ID: 0885378
- Website: www.roselandnj.org

Roseland is a borough in western Essex County, in the U.S. state of New Jersey. As of the 2020 United States census, the borough's population was 6,299, an increase of 480 (+8.2%) from the 2010 census count of 5,819, which in turn reflected an increase of 521 (+9.8%) from the 5,298 counted in the 2000 census.

In 2015, New Jersey Monthly magazine ranked Roseland as its seventh-best place to live in its "Best Places To Live" in New Jersey rankings. The borough was ranked 14th best place to live in the magazine's 2008 rankings. In 2017, New Jersey Monthly Ranked Roseland as its 106th best place to live in its 2017 Rankings. New Jersey Monthly magazine ranked Roseland as its 14th best place to live in New Jersey in its 2019 ranking. Roseland has both a First Aid Squad and Fire Department that serves its community. They also have tennis, pickleball, soccer courts, as well as turf fields for its residents.

== History ==
Roseland was part of the Horseneck Tract, which was an area that consisted of what are now the municipalities of Caldwell, West Caldwell, North Caldwell, Fairfield, Verona, Cedar Grove, Essex Fells, Roseland, and portions of Livingston and West Orange. In 1702, settlers purchased the 14,000 acres (57 km^{2}) Horseneck Tract—so-called because of its irregular shape that suggested a horse's neck and head—from the Lenni Lenape Native Americans for goods equal to $325. This purchase encompassed much of western Essex County, from the First Mountain to the Passaic River.

Originally named Centerville, the name of the community was changed in 1874 to Roseland to avoid confusion with the several other Centervilles spread across the state, most specifically Centerville, Hunterdon County, New Jersey, which already had a post office under that name. Roseland was chosen over the alternative proposed name of "Roselyn".

One of the most notable places of interest in the borough was the Becker Farm Railroad, otherwise known as the Centerville & Southwestern Railroad. A miniature railroad operated from 1938 until 1972 on the Becker Farm, which once comprised nearly half of the total area within Roseland and which is now mostly a large business complex. Some vestiges of the railroad still exist.

In 1907, a delegation of residents petitioned Livingston Township officials to construct a school for the growing population in Roseland. The rejection of their request led to the efforts to create an independent municipality, which was established on April 10, 1908.

Roseland was incorporated as a borough by an act of the New Jersey Legislature on April 10, 1908, from portions of Livingston Township.

== Geography ==
According to the United States Census Bureau, the borough had a total area of 3.64 square miles (9.43 km^{2}), including 3.62 square miles (9.37 km^{2}) of land and 0.03 square miles (0.06 km^{2}) of water (0.69%). Roseland is located about 20 miles (30 km) west of New York City and is part of the New York-Northern New Jersey-Long Island, NY-NJ-CT Metropolitan Statistical Area.

The borough borders the municipalities of Essex Fells, Livingston, West Caldwell and West Orange in Essex County; and East Hanover Township in Morris County.

== Demographics ==
Historical population
Census	Pop.	Note	%±
1910	486		—
1920	609		25.3%
1930	1,058		73.7%
1940	1,556		47.1%
1950	2,019		29.8%
1960	2,804		38.9%
1970	4,453		58.8%
1980	5,330		19.7%
1990	4,847		−9.1%
2000	5,298		9.3%
2010	5,819		9.8%
2020	6,299		8.2%
2024 (est.)	6,370	▲	1.1%
Population sources: 1910–1920 1910 1910–1930; 1940–2000 2000; 2010 2020

=== 2020 census ===
As of the 2020 census, Roseland had a population of 6,299. The median age was 48.7 years. 18.4% of residents were under the age of 18 and 25.4% of residents were 65 years of age or older. For every 100 females there were 90.9 males, and for every 100 females age 18 and over there were 87.9 males age 18 and over.

100.0% of residents lived in urban areas, while 0.0% lived in rural areas.

There were 2,523 households in Roseland, of which 27.7% had children under the age of 18 living in them. Of all households, 58.5% were married-couple households, 12.4% were households with a male householder and no spouse or partner present, and 25.2% were households with a female householder and no spouse or partner present. About 24.5% of all households were made up of individuals and 15.3% had someone living alone who was 65 years of age or older.

There were 2,607 housing units, of which 3.2% were vacant. The homeowner vacancy rate was 0.9% and the rental vacancy rate was 4.0%.

Racial composition as of the 2020 census
Race	Number	Percent
White	4,994	79.3%
Black or African American	201	3.2%
American Indian and Alaska Native	7	0.1%
Asian	554	8.8%
Native Hawaiian and Other Pacific Islander	1	0.0%
Some other race	135	2.1%
Two or more races	407	6.5%
Hispanic or Latino (of any race)	437	6.9%

=== 2010 census ===
The 2010 United States census counted 5,819 people, 2,345 households, and 1,667 families in the borough. The population density was 1,644.4 per square mile (634.9/km^{2}). There were 2,432 housing units at an average density of 687.3 per square mile (265.4/km^{2}). The racial makeup was 90.74% (5,280) White, 1.82% (106) Black or African American, 0.07% (4) Native American, 5.79% (337) Asian, 0.00% (0) Pacific Islander, 0.50% (29) from other races, and 1.08% (63) from two or more races. Hispanic or Latino of any race were 4.50% (262) of the population.

Of the 2,345 households, 28.2% had children under the age of 18; 60.4% were married couples living together; 8.2% had a female householder with no husband present and 28.9% were non-families. Of all households, 25.0% were made up of individuals and 13.9% had someone living alone who was 65 years of age or older. The average household size was 2.48 and the average family size was 3.00.

21.0% of the population were under the age of 18, 5.1% from 18 to 24, 20.8% from 25 to 44, 31.1% from 45 to 64, and 22.0% who were 65 years of age or older. The median age was 46.7 years. For every 100 females, the population had 90.3 males. For every 100 females ages 18 and older there were 86.4 males.

The Census Bureau's 2006–2010 American Community Survey showed that (in 2010 inflation-adjusted dollars) median household income was $100,289 (with a margin of error of +/− $10,283) and the median family income was $116,118 (+/− $20,786). Males had a median income of $83,864 (+/− $16,862) versus $58,611 (+/− $12,592) for females. The per capita income for the borough was $53,042 (+/− $7,511). About 1.9% of families and 1.9% of the population were below the poverty line, including 0.8% of those under age 18 and 3.9% of those age 65 or over.

=== 2000 census ===
As of the 2000 United States census there were 5,298 people, 2,142 households, and 1,525 families residing in the borough. The population density was 1,463.6 inhabitants per square mile (565.1/km^{2}). There were 2,187 housing units at an average density of 604.2 per square mile (233.3/km^{2}). The racial makeup of the borough was 93.43% White, 0.72% African American, 0.04% Native American, 4.72% Asian, 0.43% from other races, and 0.66% from two or more races. Hispanic or Latino of any race were 2.28% of the population.

As of the 2000 Census, 32.0% of Roseland residents were of Italian ancestry, the 27th-highest percentage of any municipality in the United States, and 10th-highest in New Jersey, among all places with more than 1,000 residents identifying their ancestry.

There were 2,142 households, out of which 26.2% had children under the age of 18 living with them, 60.8% were married couples living together, 7.9% had a female householder with no husband present, and 28.8% were non-families. 25.7% of all households were made up of individuals, and 13.4% had someone living alone who was 65 years of age or older. The average household size was 2.47 and the average family size was 2.99.

In the borough the population was spread out, with 20.6% under the age of 18, 4.2% from 18 to 24, 26.3% from 25 to 44, 29.2% from 45 to 64, and 19.7% who were 65 years of age or older. The median age was 44 years. For every 100 females, there were 85.9 males. For every 100 females age 18 and over, there were 82.6 males.

The median income for a household in the borough was $82,499, and the median income for a family was $93,957. Males had a median income of $61,049 versus $41,688 for females. The per capita income for the borough was $41,415. None of the families and 1.7% of the population were living below the poverty line, including no under eighteens and 2.7% of those over 64.

== Economy ==
Companies based in Roseland include Automatic Data Processing, law firms Lowenstein Sandler Connell Foley, Curtiss-Wright, jams and jellys manufacturer Polaner, pickles and relish products maker B&G Foods, and pharmaceutical company Organon International, which opened its worldwide headquarters here in 2003.

== Arts and culture ==
Cash Cash members Jean Paul Makhlouf, Alexander Makhlouf and Samuel Frisch signed to Atlantic Records with the top 40 hit song "Take Me Home".

== Government ==
=== Local government ===
Roseland is governed under the borough form of New Jersey municipal government, which is used in 218 municipalities (of the 564) statewide, making it the most common form of government in New Jersey. The governing body is comprised of the mayor and the borough council, with all positions elected at-large on a partisan basis as part of the November general election. The mayor is elected directly by the voters to a four-year term of office. The borough council includes six members elected to serve three-year terms on a staggered basis, with two seats coming up for election each year in a three-year cycle. The borough form of government used by Roseland is a "weak mayor / strong council" government in which council members act as the legislative body with the mayor presiding at meetings and voting only in the event of a tie. The mayor can veto ordinances subject to an override by a two-thirds majority vote of the council. The mayor makes committee and liaison assignments for council members, and most appointments are made by the mayor with the advice and consent of the council.

As of 2025, the mayor of Roseland is Democrat James R. Spango, whose term of office ends December 31, 2026. Members of the Roseland Borough Council are Christopher J. Bardi (D, 2026), John Biront (D, 2026), Jean Perrotti (R, 2025), Brian W. Schroeder (R, 2027), Michele Tolli (R, 2027) and Marcelino "Moose" Trillo (D, 2025).

In March 2024, the borough council selected Neil Goldstein from a list of three candidates nominated by the Democratic municipal committee to fill the seat expiring in December 2024 that became vacant when Roger Freda resigned from office the previous month.

==== Roseland TV - Public Access Television Station ====
The Borough of Roseland has a local access television channel, Roseland TV. On Comcast, residents can watch Roseland TV on Channel 35. On Verizon FiOS, residents can watch on Channel 46, though the channel will switch to 2146 in HD by the end of 2021.

=== Federal, state and county representation ===
Roseland is located in the 11th Congressional District and is part of New Jersey's 27th state legislative district.

For the 119th United States Congress, New Jersey's 11th congressional district is represented by Analilia Mejia (D, Glen Ridge) who was elected in a 2026 special election to serve for the remainder of the Congress following the resignation Mikie Sherrill (D, Montclair), who was elected Governor of New Jersey in 2025. New Jersey is represented in the United States Senate by Democrats Cory Booker (Newark, term ends 2027) and Andy Kim (Moorestown, term ends 2031).

For the 2026–2027 session, the 27th legislative district of the New Jersey Legislature is represented in the State Senate by John F. McKeon (D, West Orange) and in the General Assembly by Rosy Bagolie (D, Livingston) and Alixon Collazos-Gill (D, Montclair).

Essex County is governed by a directly elected county executive, with legislative functions performed by the Board of County Commissioners. As of 2025, the County Executive is Joseph N. DiVincenzo Jr. (D, Roseland), whose four-year term of office ends December 31, 2026. The county's Board of County Commissioners is composed of nine members, five of whom are elected from districts and four of whom are elected on an at-large basis. They are elected for three-year concurrent terms and may be re-elected to successive terms at the annual election in November. Essex County's Commissioners are:

Robert Mercado (D, District 1 – Newark's North and East Wards, parts of Central and West Wards; Newark, 2026), A'Dorian Murray-Thomas (D, District 2 – Irvington, Maplewood and parts of Newark's South and West Wards; Newark, 2026), Vice President Tyshammie L. Cooper (D, District 3 - Newark: West and Central Wards; East Orange, Orange and South Orange; East Orange, 2026), Leonard M. Luciano (D, District 4 – Caldwell, Cedar Grove, Essex Fells, Fairfield, Livingston, Millburn, North Caldwell, Roseland, Verona, West Caldwell and West Orange; West Caldwell, 2026), President Carlos M. Pomares (D, District 5 – Belleville, Bloomfield, Glen Ridge, Montclair and Nutley; Bloomfield, 2026), Brendan W. Gill (D, at large; Montclair, 2026), Romaine Graham (D, at large; Irvington, 2026), Wayne Richardson (D, at large; Newark, 2026), Patricia Sebold (D, at-large; Livingston, 2026).

Constitutional officers elected countywide are: Clerk Christopher J. Durkin (D, West Caldwell, 2025), Register of Deeds Juan M. Rivera Jr. (D, Newark, 2029), Sheriff Amir Jones (D, Newark, 2027), and Surrogate Alturrick Kenney (D, Newark, 2028).

=== Politics ===
As of March 2011, there were a total of 4,686 registered voters in Roseland, of which 1,428 (30.5%) were registered as Democrats, 1,499 (32.0%) were registered as Republicans and 1,756 (37.5%) were registered as Unaffiliated. There were no voters registered to other parties.

United States presidential election results for Roseland
Year	Republican		Democratic		Third party(ies)	
Year	No.	%	No.	%	No.	%
2024	2,075	52.24%	1,840	46.32%	57	1.44%
2020	2,130	50.26%	2,066	48.75%	42	0.99%
2016	2,023	53.87%	1,640	43.68%	92	2.45%
2012	1,983	58.38%	1,391	40.95%	23	0.68%
2008	2,065	58.01%	1,466	41.18%	29	0.81%
2004	2,062	59.56%	1,376	39.75%	24	0.69%

In the 2012 presidential election, Republican Mitt Romney received 58.4% of the vote (1,983 cast), ahead of Democrat Barack Obama with 40.9% (1,391 votes), and other candidates with 0.7% (23 votes), among the 3,425 ballots cast by the borough's 4,832 registered voters (28 ballots were spoiled), for a turnout of 70.9%. In the 2008 presidential election, Republican John McCain received 57.5% of the vote (2,065 cast), ahead of Democrat Barack Obama with 40.8% (1,466 votes) and other candidates with 0.8% (29 votes), among the 3,593 ballots cast by the borough's 4,728 registered voters, for a turnout of 76.0%. In the 2004 presidential election, Republican George W. Bush received 59.4% of the vote (2,062 ballots cast), outpolling Democrat John Kerry with 39.6% (1,376 votes) and other candidates with 0.5% (24 votes), among the 3,471 ballots cast by the borough's 4,425 registered voters, for a turnout percentage of 78.4.

Gubernatorial election results for Roseland
Year	Republican		Democratic		Third party(ies)	
Year	No.	%	No.	%	No.	%
2025	1,688	50.84%	1,623	48.89%	9	0.27%
2021	1,527	55.73%	1,203	43.91%	10	0.36%
2017	1,177	48.56%	1,125	46.41%	122	5.03%
2013	1,559	69.91%	652	29.24%	19	0.85%
2009	1,579	59.05%	891	33.32%	204	7.63%
2005	1,361	56.90%	989	41.35%	42	1.76%

In the 2013 gubernatorial election, Republican Chris Christie received 69.9% of the vote (1,559 cast), ahead of Democrat Barbara Buono with 29.2% (652 votes), and other candidates with 0.9% (19 votes), among the 2,275 ballots cast by the borough's 4,858 registered voters (45 ballots were spoiled), for a turnout of 46.8%. In the 2009 gubernatorial election, Republican Chris Christie received 58.7% of the vote (1,579 ballots cast), ahead of Democrat Jon Corzine with 33.1% (891 votes), Independent Chris Daggett with 7.2% (193 votes) and other candidates with 0.4% (11 votes), among the 2,691 ballots cast by the borough's 4,658 registered voters, yielding a 57.8% turnout.

United States Senate election results for Roseland1
Year	Republican		Democratic		Third party(ies)	
Year	No.	%	No.	%	No.	%
2024	1,928	50.68%	1,816	47.74%	60	1.58%
2018	1,520	54.31%	1,189	42.48%	90	3.22%
2012	1,642	53.71%	1,356	44.36%	59	1.93%
2006	1,451	58.16%	1,015	40.68%	29	1.16%

United States Senate election results for Roseland2
Year	Republican		Democratic		Third party(ies)	
Year	No.	%	No.	%	No.	%
2020	2,111	51.18%	1,979	47.98%	35	0.85%
2014	941	54.30%	778	44.89%	14	0.81%
2013	901	56.92%	668	42.20%	14	0.88%
2008	1,840	57.83%	1,304	40.98%	38	1.19%

== Education ==
The Roseland School District serves public school students in pre-kindergarten through sixth grade at Lester C. Noecker Elementary School. As of the 2021–22 school year, the district, comprised of one school, had an enrollment of 467 students and 44.1 classroom teachers (on an FTE basis), for a student–teacher ratio of 10.6:1.

Students in public school for seventh through twelfth grades attend the West Essex Regional School District, a regional school district serving students from four municipalities in western Essex County. Communities served by the district's schools are Essex Fells, Fairfield, North Caldwell and Roseland. Schools in the district (with 2021–22 enrollment data from the National Center for Education Statistics) are West Essex Middle School with 548 students in grades 7-8 and West Essex High School with 1,048 students in grades 9-12. Seats on the nine-member board of education of the high school district are allocated based on population, with two seats assigned to Roseland.

== Transportation ==
=== Roads and highways ===
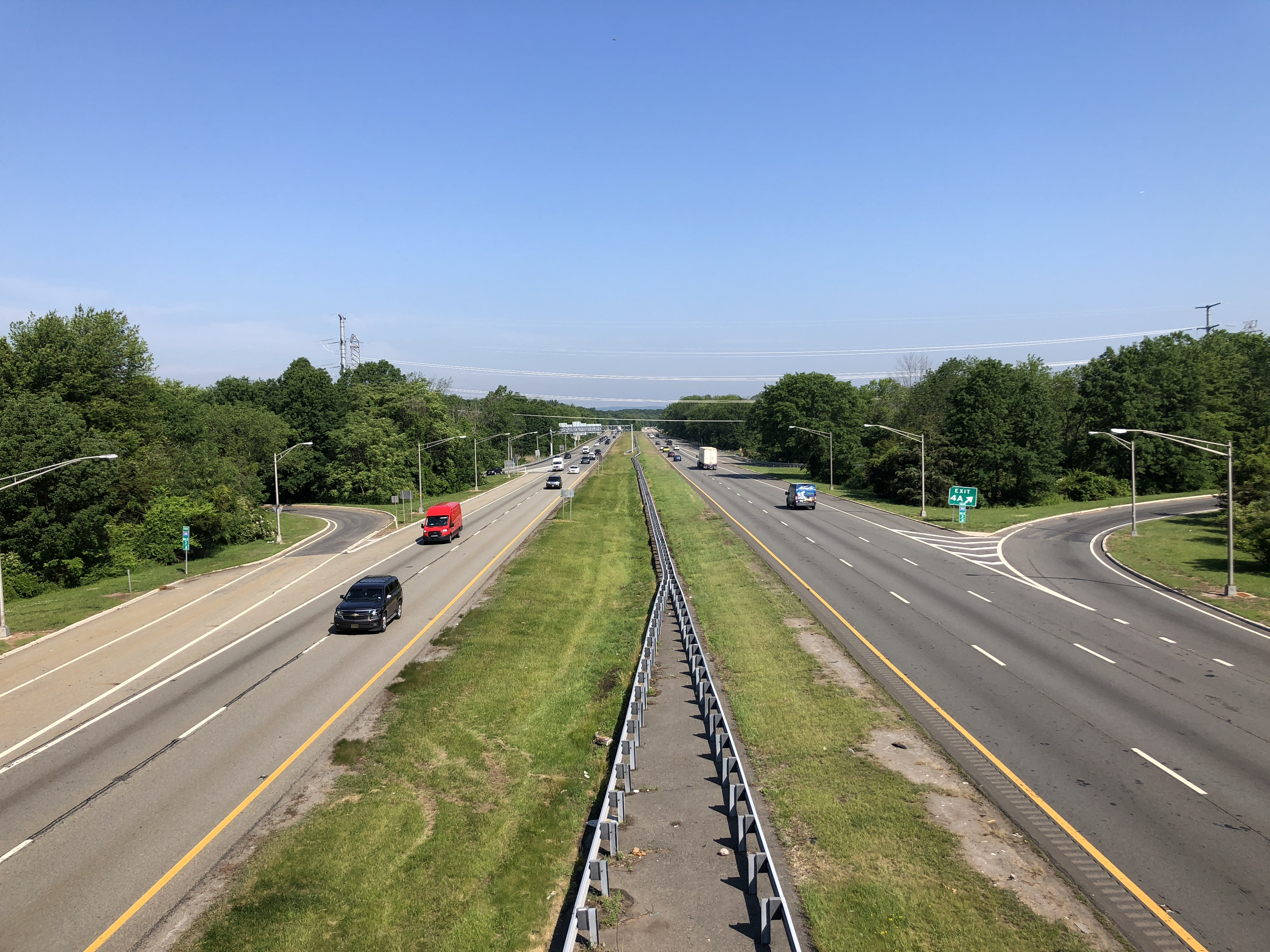
View west along Interstate 280 in Roseland

As of May 2010, the borough had a total of 24.95 miles (40.15 km) of roadways, of which 14.08 miles (22.66 km) were maintained by the municipality, 8.31 miles (13.37 km) by Essex County and 2.56 miles (4.12 km) by the New Jersey Department of Transportation.

Interstate 280 passes for 2.5 miles (4.0 km) through the borough, connecting East Hanover Township and Livingston. County Route 527, County Route 609, and County Route 611 also pass through the borough.

=== Public transportation ===
NJ Transit offers bus service to Newark on the 71 route.

The Whippany Line of the Morristown & Erie Railway, a small freight line, traverses and serves a food products manufacturer in the township. Established in 1895, the line runs from Morristown and runs through East Hanover Township and Hanover Township to Roseland.

== Notable people ==
People who were born in, residents of, or otherwise closely associated with Roseland include:

- Denise Borino-Quinn (1964–2010), actress who played the role of Ginny Sacramoni, the wife of New York mob boss Johnny Sack in The Sopranos
- Mary Jo Codey (born 1955), mental health advocate and schoolteacher who is the former First Lady of New Jersey
- Richard Codey (1946–2026), member of the New Jersey Senate
- Fillmore Condit (1855–1939), inventor, temperance activist and local politician
- Joseph N. DiVincenzo Jr. (born 1952), County Executive of Essex County since 2003
- Kevin Monangai (born 1993), running back who played in the NFL for the Philadelphia Eagles
- Kyle Monangai (born 2002), American football running back for the Chicago Bears
- Lake Underwood (1926–2008), entrepreneur who competed as a champion in the racing of prototype automobiles and motorcycles
- Janet G. Woititz (1938–1994), psychologist and researcher best known for her writings and lectures about the adult children of alcoholic parents
- Adella Wotherspoon (1903–2004), survivor of the 1904 General Slocum disaster, in which more than 1,000 passengers were killed in a fire
