= Spice Islands (disambiguation) =

The Spice Islands, now known as the Maluku Islands, are an archipelago in the eastern part of Indonesia.

Spice Island, Island of Spice, or Spice Isle may also refer to:

- Zanzibar Archipelago off the coast of mainland Tanzania, Africa
- Grenada in the Antilles
- Portsmouth Point, in Portsmouth, Hampshire, England
- Spice Islands (brand), an American brand of spice
