= List of twice-baked foods =

The following is a list of twice-baked foods. Twice-baked foods are foods that are baked twice in their preparation. Baking is a food cooking method using prolonged dry heat acting by convection, and not by thermal radiation, normally in an oven, but also in hot ashes, or on hot stones. When the desired temperature is reached within the heating instrument, the food is placed inside and baked for a certain amount of time. Such items are sometimes referred to as "baked goods", and are sold at a bakery.

== Twice-baked foods ==
Name	Image	Origin	Description
Bappir		Sumer	An historical Sumerian twice-baked barley bread that was primarily used in ancient Mesopotamian beer brewing. Historical research done at Anchor Brewing Co. in 1989 (documented in Charlie Papazian's Home Brewer's Companion, ISBN 0-380-77287-6) reconstructed a bread made from malted barley and barley flour with honey and water and baked until hard enough to store for long periods of time; the finished product was probably crumbled and mixed with water, malt and either dates or honey and allowed to ferment, producing a somewhat sweet brew. It seems to have been drunk with a straw in the manner that yerba mate is drunk now.
Biscotti		Prato, Italy	More accurately known as biscotti di Prato (Prato biscuits), also known as cantuccini (coffee bread), are twice-baked biscuits originating in the Italian city of Prato. The biscuits are oblong-shaped almond biscuits, made dry and crunchy through cutting the loaf of dough while still hot and fresh from baking in the oven. Pictured is chocolate and pistachio biscotti.
Biscuit			A baked, commonly flour-based food product. The Middle French word bescuit is derived from the Latin words bis (twice) and coquere, coctus (to cook, cooked), and, hence, means "twice-cooked". This is because biscuits were originally cooked in a twofold process: first baked, and then dried out in a slow oven. This term was then adapted into English in the 14th century during the Middle Ages, in the Middle English word bisquite, to represent a hard, twice-baked product. The term is applied to two distinct products in North America and the Commonwealth of Nations and Europe. Pictured is an American biscuit (left) and British biscuits (right), demonstrating the difference between the American English and British English meaning of "biscuit".
Bread pudding			A bread-based dessert popular in many countries' cuisine, including that of Cuba, Ireland, Great Britain, France, Belgium, Puerto Rico, Mexico, Malta, Argentina, Louisiana Creole, and the southern United States. In other languages, its name is a translation of "bread pudding" or even just "pudding", for example pudín or budín in Spanish; also in Spanish another name is migas (crumbs). In Mexico, there is a similar dish, capirotada.
Biskotso			Baked bread topped with butter and sugar, or garlic, in some cases. The etymology of the word itself is related to the English biscuit and Italian biscotti, in that it is derived from the Latin phrase word bis coctus, which means "twice baked".
Crouton			Sautéed or rebaked bread, often cubed and seasoned, that is used to add texture and flavor to salads, notably the Caesar salad, as an accompaniment to soups, or eaten as a snack food. The word crouton is derived from the French croûton, itself derived from croûte, meaning "crust". Croutons can be of any size, up to a very large slice.
Detroit-style pizza		Detroit, Michigan	A style of pizza developed in Detroit, Michigan. It is a square pizza similar to Sicilian-style pizza that has a thick deep-dish crisp crust and toppings such as pepperoni and olives and is served with the marinara sauce on top. The crust of a Detroit-style pizza is noteworthy because in addition to occasionally being twice-baked, it is usually baked in a well-oiled pan to a chewy medium-well-done state that gives the bottom and edges of the crust a fried/crunchy texture.
Fat rascal			Also called the Yorkshire tea biscuit or turf cake, it is a type of cake, similar to the scone in both taste and ingredients. They are round domed tea-cakes with a rich brown crust and made with currants and candied peel. They are closely associated with the Cleveland area on the borders of County Durham and Yorkshire.
Mandelbrodt			A dessert associated with Eastern European Jews. The Yiddish word mandelbrodt literally means almond bread. It is made by forming dough into a loaf, baking it, slicing the loaf into oblong cookies and baking again. The crunchy, dry cookies were popular in Eastern Europe among rabbis, merchants and other itinerant Jews as a staple dessert that kept well.
Melba toast			A dry, crisp and thinly sliced toast, often served with soup and salad or topped with either melted cheese or pâté. Melba toast is made by lightly toasting slices of bread under a grill, on both sides. The resulting toast is then sliced laterally. The thin slices are then returned to the grill with the untoasted sides towards the heat source, resulting in toast half the normal thickness. It is named after Dame Nellie Melba, the stage name of Australian opera singer Helen Porter Mitchell. Its name is thought to date from 1897, when the singer was very ill and it became a staple of her diet. The toast was created for her by chef and fan Auguste Escoffier, who also created the Peach Melba dessert for her. The hotel proprietor César Ritz supposedly named it in a conversation with Escoffier.
New York-style cheesecake		New York City, circa 1920s	The typical New York cheesecake is rich and has a dense, smooth and creamy consistency, and relies upon heavy cream or sour cream and cream cheese. Sour cream makes the cheesecake more resilient to freezing and is the method by which most frozen cheesecakes are made. However, a lavish variant uses sour cream as a topping, applied when the cheesecake is cooked. It is mixed with vanilla extract and sugar and replaced in the oven, so that it is twice-baked.
Paximathia		Greece	A bread of Greek origin that is prepared with whole wheat, chick pea or barley flour. Traditional versions were twice-baked.
Rusk			A hard, dry biscuit or a twice-baked bread. It is sometimes used as a baby teething food. The dish has significant international variations. Pictured are rusk squares made of rye sourdough bread.
Twice-baked potato			Prepared using baked potatoes, the interior of the potato is scooped out after being first-baked. Additional ingredients are added to the potato that is scooped out, and the mix is then placed in the potato shells and baked again. Pictured is a twice baked potato with cheddar cheese, bacon and green onion topping.
Zwieback			A type of crisp, sweetened bread, made with eggs and baked twice. It is sliced before it is baked a second time, which produces crisp, brittle slices that closely resemble melba toast. The name comes from German zwei ("two") or zwie ("twi-"), and backen, meaning "to bake". Zwieback hence literally translates to "twice-baked". Zwieback is commonly used to feed teething children.

== See also ==
- Rusk article has longer list from many cultures
- List of baked goods
- List of cookies and biscuits
- List of cooking techniques
- Outline of food preparation
- Pommes soufflées
- Triple Cooked Chips
