= Mrs. Dash =

Brand of seasoning products

- Place of origin: United States
- Invented: 1981

Mrs. Dash is an American brand of salt-free seasoning that was introduced in 1983 and was marketed by B&G Foods. The best known varieties of Mrs. Dash are granulated mixtures of dried herbs and spices which are sold in small plastic shaker bottles holding 2.5 oz of product, 1.25 oz packets, for seasoning a 'family-size' meal, and .02 oz single-serving packets for consumers and institutional use, e.g. for patients on sodium-restricted diets.

The product line was originally developed by Carol Bernick, now executive chairperson of the company. In the 1980s, while a marketing executive at the firm, she was frustrated with the products available to flavor the meals she prepared at home for her family. She invented a salt-free blend of her own to fill the need for a convenient way to flavor the food without using salt. The original formula, which was first marketed in 1981, was developed with a variety of spice suppliers. Before settling on the name "Mrs. Dash," the company considered the name "Mrs. Pinch."

The brand was formerly owned by Alberto-Culver; following the merger with Unilever, it sold its food business to B&G Foods.

In 1990, Mrs. Dash used the tagline "I Love Mrs. Dash". In 1993, it adopted the tagline "A Garden of Flavor, Instead of Salt", and in 1994, the tagline "Do it Better with Mrs. Dash" was used.

In early 2020, the product was rebranded as "Dash", dropping the "Mrs." from its name.

== Seasoning blends ==
The company produces seasoning blends in thirteen varieties:

- Original
- Extra Spicy
- Lemon Pepper
- Southwest Chipotle
- Tomato Basil Garlic
- Garlic & Herb
- Italian Medley
- Onion & Herb Blend
- Table [in 2.5 oz and 6.75 oz bottles]
- Fiesta Lime
- Caribbean Citrus
- Everything But the Salt
- Spicy Jalapeño

It also produces grilling blends in two flavors (originally known as Papa Dash):

- Steak Grilling Blend
- Chicken Grilling Blend

== Marinades ==
The company produces three flavors of 10-minute liquid marinades sold in 12 oz plastic bottles:

- Garlic Herb
- Lime Garlic
- Sweet Teriyaki Marinade
