= Kevin Monangai =

American football player (born 1993)

No. 39
- Position: Running back

Personal information
- Born: March 4, 1993 (age 33); Roseland, New Jersey, U.S.
- Listed height: 5 ft 8 in (1.73 m)
- Listed weight: 209 lb (95 kg)

Career information
- High school: Seton Hall Preparatory School
- College: Villanova University
- NFL draft: 2015: undrafted

Career history
- Philadelphia Eagles (2015–2016)*; Minnesota Vikings (2016)*
- * Offseason or practice squad member only

Kevin Monangai (born March 4, 1993) is an American former professional football running back. He played college football for the Villanova University Wildcats and received All-CAA honors. He was an assistant offensive coach for the New York Giants until January 2020.

== Professional career ==
=== Philadelphia Eagles ===
On August 1, 2015, Monangai signed to the Philadelphia Eagles. On September 1, 2015, he was waived. On September 15, 2015, Monangai re-signed to the Eagles' practice squad. On September 22, 2015, he was released. On December 29, 2015, Monangai re-signed to their practice squad. On January 4, 2016, Monangai signed a reserve/future contract. On May 5, 2016, he was waived.

=== Minnesota Vikings ===
On August 4, 2016, Monangai signed with the Vikings. On August 20, 2016, Monangai was released by the Vikings.

== Personal life ==
Monangai grew up in Roseland, New Jersey and played high school football at Seton Hall Preparatory School. His brother Kyle Monangai is a running back for the Chicago Bears. He led the Big Ten in rushing in 2023 for the Rutgers Scarlet Knights. His sister, Kathy Monangai, is a PharmD graduate of the University of Pittsburgh.
