= Williams-Harrison House =

- U.S. National Register of Historic Places
- New Jersey Register of Historic Places
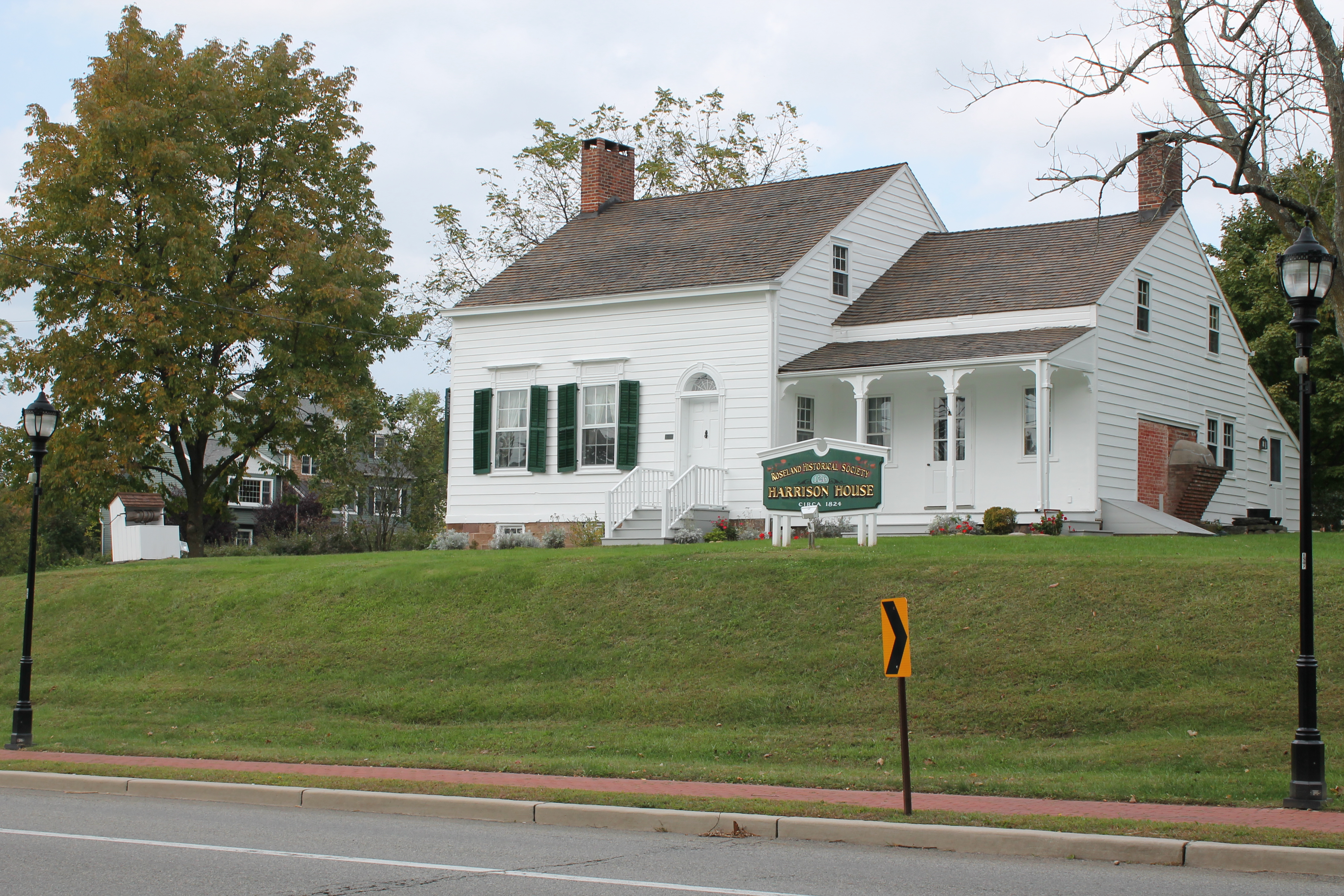

- Location within Essex County, New Jersey Location within New Jersey Location within the United States
- Location: 126 Eagle Rock Avenue, Roseland, New Jersey
- Coordinates: 40°49′14″N 74°17′24″W
- Built: 1824
- Architectural style: Federal
- NRHP reference No.: 79001488
- NJRHP No.: 1359

Significant dates
- Added to NRHP: March 13, 1979
- Designated NJRHP: November 24, 1978

The Williams-Harrison House, also known as the Harrison House, is located at 126 Eagle Rock Avenue in the borough of Roseland in Essex County, New Jersey, United States. It was documented by the Historic American Buildings Survey (HABS) program in 1936. The house was added to the National Register of Historic Places on March 13, 1979, for its significance in agriculture, architecture, industry, law, and politics.

== History ==
The Williams-Harrison House was built around 1824 by Amos Williams, Jr. after purchasing 98 acres from the estate of Adonijah Edison. The property was later reduced to a seven-acre family farm with livestock, chicken coops, fruit trees, a vegetable garden and outhouses used for the practice of tanning and shoemaking. It is an example of rural Federal architecture.

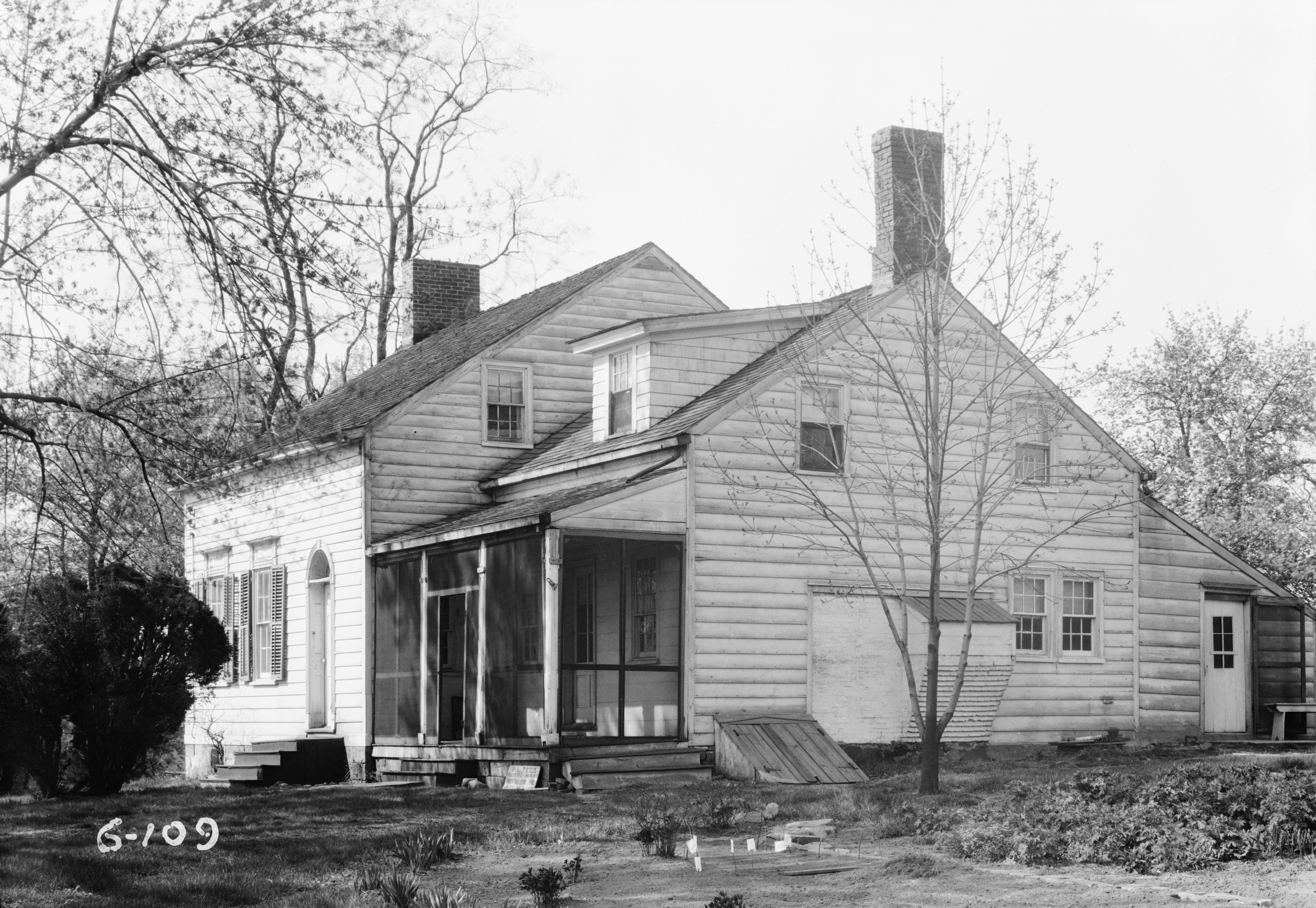
HABS photo from 1936

== See also ==
- National Register of Historic Places listings in Essex County, New Jersey
