= International Home Foods =

American branded foods company

International Home Foods, Inc.
- Company type: Public
- Traded as: NYSE: IHF
- Industry: Food
- Predecessor: American Home Foods division of American Home Products
- Founded: November 1996; 29 years ago
- Defunct: June 2000
- Fate: Acquired by ConAgra Foods
- Headquarters: Parsippany, New Jersey
- Key people: Dean Metropoulos (chairman and CEO)
- Brands: Chef Boyardee; Bumble Bee Seafood; PAM; Gulden's
- Owners: Hicks, Muse, Tate & Furst and C. Dean Metropoulos & Co. (80% 1996–1997, 43% 1997–2000)

International Home Foods (IHF) was an American manufacturer, distributor and marketer of food products, based in Parsippany, New Jersey. It was acquired in 2000 by ConAgra Foods and merged into ConAgra's Grocery Products division. IHF's best known brands were Chef Boyardee pasta products, Bumble Bee Seafood, PAM cooking spray, and Gulden's mustard.

== History ==
The company was founded in November 1996 when American Home Products spun off its food business, American Home Foods, which was acquired by private equity firm Hicks, Muse, Tate & Furst and C. Dean Metropoulos & Co. and renamed International Home Foods. The latter paid US$1.2 billion to acquire 80% of IHF. Dean Metropoulos became chairman and CEO following the acquisition.

In July 1997, IHF acquired Bumble Bee Seafoods out of bankruptcy protection for US$163 million plus the assumption of debt. IHF went public in November 1997 and subsequently made a number of acquisitions in quick succession.

In March 1998 it acquired private-label foods producer Grist Mill Co. for US$100 million, then bought Canadian canned meat and stew producer Puritan from Unilever subsidiary Lipton for US$39 million followed by canned soup and pasta producer Venice Maid, and in August bought Libby's canned meat business from Nestlé for US$126 million.

Following poor stock performance in 1998, its price dropping by over two-thirds in six months, IHF began looking for a buyer. The company's valuation issues were largely caused by investor disinterest in a company with such widely diversified brands. In December 1998, ConAgra offered IHF $20 per share but IHF rejected the offer as too low. This was followed by multiple negotiations with other companies over an 18-month period, none of which materialized.

The company bought Canadian canned seafood brands Clover Leaf and Paramount in 1999 from George Weston Ltd. and later that year raised US$9.6 million in 1999 with its sale of the Polaner fruit spreads brand to B&G Foods. Despite its lackluster stock performance, by 2000 the company had grown to annual sales of about US$2.2 billion.

IHF was finally acquired in June 2000 by ConAgra Foods in a US$2.9 billion deal, $2 per share higher than ConAgra's initial 1998 offer. Much of the former IHF operation was integrated into ConAgra's Irvine, California-based ConAgra Grocery Products division.

== Brands ==
During its four years in operation, International Home Foods owned a variety of brands including:

- Bumble Bee Seafood
- Campfire marshmallows
- Chef Boyardee pasta
- Clover Leaf Seafoods
- Crunch 'n Munch popcorn
- Dennison's chili
- Grist Mill cereals
- Gulden's mustard
- Jiffy Pop popcorn
- Libby's canned meats
- Louis Kemp
- Luck's canned foods
- Maypo cereal
- Orleans
- PAM cooking spray
- Paramount seafood
- Polaner fruit spreads
- Puritan stews
- Ranch Style Beans
- Ro-Tel canned tomatoes and chilis
- Venice Maid canned pasta and soup
