= Robert's American Gourmet Food =

Former American snack foods producer

Robert's American Gourmet Food LLC
- Founded: 1986; 40 years ago
- Founder: Robert Ehrlich
- Brands: Pirate's Booty; Smart Puffs; Original Tings
- Parent: B&G Foods (2013-2018); The Hershey Company (from 2018)

Robert's American Gourmet Food was a snack food company located in the United States. Founded by businessman Robert Ehrlich in 1986, the company was best known for its snack food, Pirate's Booty, which is found in over 90% of United States supermarkets. Robert's American Gourmet targeted health-conscious shoppers with a range of snack foods.

Products made by Robert's included Pirate's Booty, Smart Puffs, and Original Tings.

Robert's American Gourmet Food LLC was acquired by B&G Foods in 2013.

In 2018, B&G Foods announced that Robert's American Gourmet would be sold to The Hershey Company.
