= Gulden's =

American manufacturer of mustard

- Product type: Mustard
- Current owner: Conagra Brands
- Country: United States
- Introduced: 1862; 164 years ago
- Previous owners: International Home Foods
- Website: guldens.com

Gulden's is the third largest American manufacturer of mustard, after French's and Grey Poupon. One of the oldest continuously operating mustard brands in the United States, it is now owned by agricultural giant ConAgra Foods.

Gulden's is known for its spicy brown mustard, which includes a blend of mustard seeds and spices. The Gulden's mustard recipe has remained a secret for more than 140 years.

== History ==
Charles Gulden was born on September 23, 1843, in New York City. By the age of 15, he was employed as an engraver. Two years later, he went to work for his uncle, who owned the Union Mustard Mills. After serving with a reserve regiment at Gettysburg during the Civil War, he returned briefly to his uncle's shop.

Gulden opened his own mustard company in 1867. He chose Elizabeth Street for his shop, near the South Street shipping berths, where he could easily obtain the mustard seeds and spices necessary to mix with vintage vinegars. For a time, Gulden's packaged every jar with a spoon.

In 1875, Gulden expanded sales beyond New York State. In 1881, his family filed a patent for a vessel that could dispense mustard with a plunger, which are still used today. Gulden was also awarded a patent on a mustard jar cap in 1893.

By 1883, Gulden's product line included 30 mustard varieties and other products, including olives, capers, cottonseed oil, ketchup, and Worcestershire sauce. That year, he expanded down the street into a six-story building.

Charles Gulden, Jr. took over the business in 1911 and began focusing exclusively on mustard. Charles Gulden died in 1916 and is buried at Woodlawn Cemetery in the Bronx, New York. Noticing the public's preference for yellow mustard, the company introduced "Gulden’s Prepared Yellow Mustard" in 1949.

Another Charles Gulden became chairman of the board and president in 1956. After 93 years, the company also sold its Bowery property and moved to Saddle Brook, New Jersey.

Gulden's was sold to American Home Foods (a division of American Home Products) in 1960, which was spun off and renamed International Home Foods in 1996. In 2000, ConAgra purchased International Home Foods and moved manufacturing to Milton, Pennsylvania. By 2002, Gulden's had 6.6 percent market share.

== Awards ==
Gulden's mustard made its competitive debut at the 38th annual Fair of the American Institute in 1869, winning a "second medal" under the Department of Chemistry and Mineralogy. It is this medal that is still featured on its label today.

Gulden's mustard was again recognized by the American Institute in 1883 "for exceptional quality and flavor, pride and innovation." It also earned awards at the World's Columbian Exposition (Chicago 1893), the Exposition Universelle (Paris 1900), and the Sesquicentennial International Exposition (Philadelphia 1926). Gulden's won Gold as Best Deli/Brown Mustard at the 2005 Napa Valley Mustard Festival in 2005.

However, the Gulden's mustard sold today is not the same formula as the mustard that won the awards in the late nineteenth and early twentieth century. As recently as the 1960s, when the company was headquartered in Saddle Brook, New Jersey, the ingredients listed on the label were: "Mustard seed, vinegar, spices, and salt." Turmeric was not listed, as it is today.

== See also ==
- List of mustard brands

== Sources ==
- Hallett, Anthony and Diane Hallett, 1997, Encyclopedia of Entrepreneurs, Entrepreneur Magazine, pp 238–239.
