= Polaner =

American fruit preserves brand

Polaner is an American brand of fruit preserves and condiments that was founded by Max and Lena Polaner as M. Polaner Inc. in the late 19th century in Newark, New Jersey. It was renamed M. Polaner and Son, Inc. when their son Sidney Polaner joined the company.

== About ==
Its largest brand is Polaner All Fruit topping. It was acquired by Artal Group in 1986 but sold to American Home Products in 1993, later International Home Foods. B&G Foods acquired the brand in 1999 from International Home Foods.

== Advertising ==
Polaner All Fruit is best known for the "Don't DARE call it jelly" campaign in the 80s and 90s, in which a succession of well-to-do users of the product ask to "pass the Polaner All Fruit" before a decidedly more uncouth fellow asks to "please pass the jelly," leaving everyone shocked and appalled.

== History ==
Max Polaner and his wife Lena started preserving fresh fruits and picking fresh vegetables before 1900. Together the two had a fruit and vegetable store located in Newark, New Jersey. As a side business they also sold jellies, preserves, sauerkraut, pickles and many other goods. Eventually Max and Lena extended their business outside of just their neighborhood of Newark and into grocery stores throughout New York and New Jersey metropolitan areas.

In 1910, their business needed to expand due to high demand. They ended up moving their business to larger quarters where their ten employees were still very busy. The business grew to sending goods up to 100 miles away, thus causing another need for an even larger facility and workforce.

A new facility was built in 1928 where 30 employees were welcomed into the Polaner family business. Consumers continued to buy Polaner goods for the next forty years. Once again the Polaner business decided to move to an even larger location. To keep up with other preserving plants, Polaner decided to modernize its capabilities.

In 1968, the business decided to construct its facility on eight acres of land in Roseland, New Jersey. This facility took on two expansions, one in 1972 and the other in 1978 resulting in an 80,000-square-foot (7,400-square-meter) facility which is still being used today.

Max's grandson, Leonard Polaner decided to introduce the newest innovation in the preserve category, Polaner All Fruit. This new preserve is sweetened only with fruit and fruit juice.
