= Durkee (food brand) =

Spices and seasonings brand

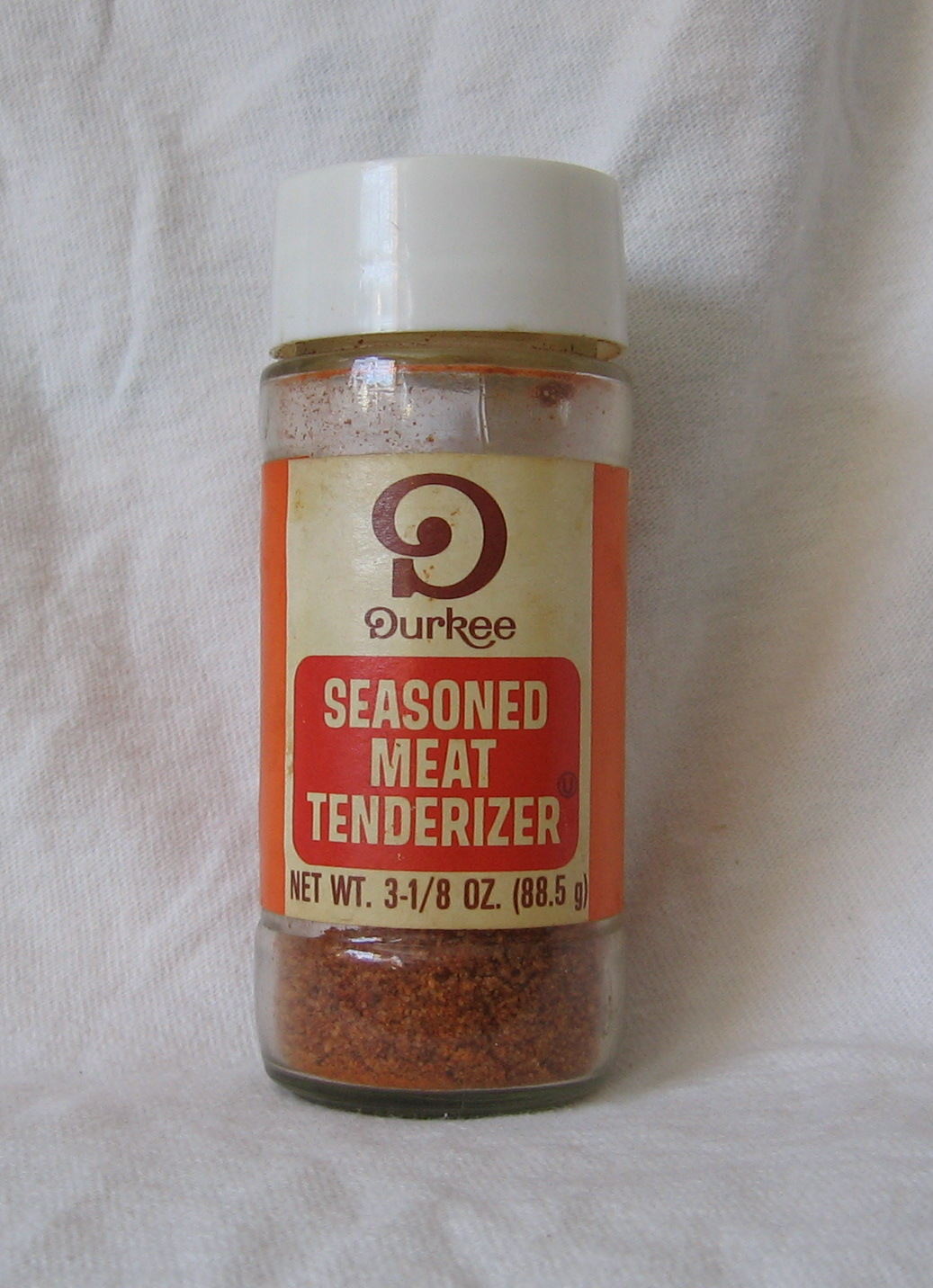
- Jar of seasoned meat tenderizer
- Current owner: B&G Foods
- Introduced: 1851

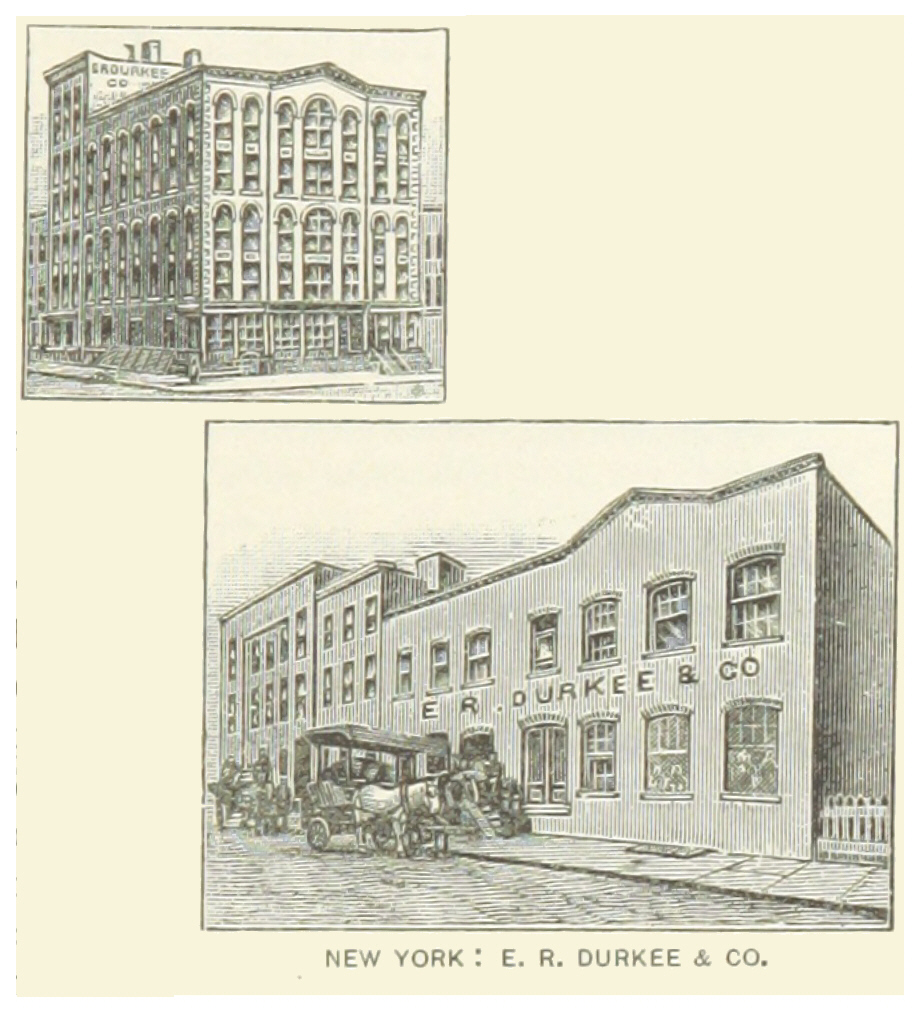
E.R. Durkee & Company (1891 etching)

Durkee is an American brand of spices, marinades, and powdered sauce mixes owned by B&G Foods. Durkee Famous Foods was established by Eugene R. Durkee in 1851.

== History ==
Durkee's was established by Eugene R. Durkee, the founder of E. R. Durkee & Co. Spice dealers in Buffalo, New York, in 1857. By 1917, the company had built a four-story industrial structure in Elmhurst, Queens. Durkee became the largest factory and employer in Elmhurst, with over 300 employees, primarily women. E.R. Durkee died in 1926, leaving everything to his daughters.

Upon its purchase as a division of Glidden Co. in 1929, it became Durkee's Famous Foods. In 1967, Glidden merged with SCM Corp (formerly Smith-Corona company) and Durkee became the Glidden-Durkee Division of SCM.

Since the 1980s the company has had a series of owners, starting with the sale of SCM to Hanson Trust, PLC in 1986 before it was absorbed into a larger-food processing conglomerate, ACH Food Companies, a subsidiary of Associated British Foods, which ultimately sold it to B&G Foods in 2016. That acquisition included the company's major production and distribution facility in Ankeny, Iowa that was originally the home of Tone Brothers Spices when it was owned by Rykoff Sexton. The Elmhurst building had been renovated in 2007 to become the Elmhurst Educational Campus, hosting three separate high schools.

The company's distinctive "mustardy, vinegary, mayonnaise-based" Durkee Sauce is sold at Court Street Grocers in Brooklyn and served on their Turkey + Durkee sandwich.
