= PAM (cooking oil) =

Brand of cooking spray

- Product type: Cooking spray
- Current owner: Conagra Foods
- Introduced: 1959
- Website: www.pamcookingspray.com

PAM is a cooking spray currently owned and distributed by ConAgra Foods. Its main ingredient is canola oil.

PAM is marketed in various flavors, such as butter and olive oil, meant to impart the flavor of cooking with those ingredients. PAM also markets high-temperature sprays formulated for use when grilling, etc., and one containing flour suitable for dry-cooking as in baking.

PAM is marketed as a nominally zero-calorie alternative to other oils used as lubricants when using cooking methods such as sautéing or baking (US regulations allow food products to claim to be zero-calorie if they contain fewer than 5 calories per Reference Amount Customarily Consumed and per labeled serving, and the serving size of a one-third second spray is only 0.3 g containing about 2 calories).

== History ==
PAM was introduced in 1959 by Leon Rubin who, with advertising executive Arthur Meyerhoff, started PAM Products, Inc. to market the spray. The name PAM is an acronym for Product of Arthur Meyerhoff.

In 1971, Gibraltar Industries merged with American Home Products and became part of the Boyle-Midway portfolio. By 1985, PAM began to diversify its offerings by developing butter and olive oil sprays.

When the company divested its Boyle-Midway Household Products division to Reckitt & Colman in 1990, PAM was one of the few products American Home Products retained. It later became part of the American Home Foods subsidiary. In 1992, PAM changed its formula to include canola oil in an effort to reduce its saturated fats content and improve taste.

In 1996, AHF was acquired from American Home Products by Hicks, Muse, Tate & Furst and C. Dean Metropoulos & Company, becoming International Home Foods. In turn, International Home Foods was acquired by Conagra in June 2000.

In 2003, PAM introduced a new baking spray including real flour. A variation made specifically for grilling was introduced in 2004. PAM Professional, for high heat applications, debuted in September 2007.

In October 2023, Conagra was ordered to pay $7.1 million in damages to a Pennsylvania woman following a 2017 incident where a can of PAM exploded in her face and caused second degree burns. At the time of the verdict, there were more than 50 similar cases filed against the company. The litigations stem from a 10 oz. can manufactured between 2011 and 2019 that introduced a U-shape vent on the bottom but has shown to have a lower threshold for heat than previous versions.
