= Cooking spray =

Edible oil delivered as an aerosol

- Alternative names: Nonstick spray

Cooking spray is a spray form of an oil as a lubricant, lecithin as an emulsifier, and a propellant such as nitrous oxide, carbon dioxide or propane. Cooking spray is applied to frying pans and other cookware to prevent food from sticking. Traditionally, cooks use butter, shortening, or oils poured or rubbed on cookware. Most cooking sprays have less food energy per serving than an application of vegetable oil, because they are applied in a much thinner layer: US regulations allow many to be labelled "zero-calorie"; in the UK sprays claim to supply "less than 1 calorie per serving". Popular US brands include Pam, Crisco, and Baker's Joy. Sprays are available with plain vegetable oil, butter and olive oil flavor.

Cooking spray has other culinary uses besides being applied to cookware. Sticky candies, such as Mike and Ike, that are often sold in bulk vending machines may be sprayed with cooking spray to keep them from sticking together in the machines. Coating the inside of a measuring cup with the spray allows sticky substances, such as honey, to pour out more easily. Vegetables may be sprayed before seasoning to make the seasonings stick better.
