= David Bluefield =

American musician and songwriter

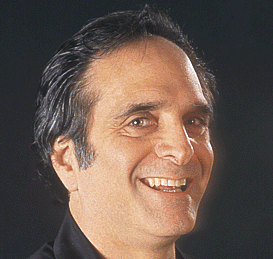
- Born: Los Angeles, California, U.S.
- Occupations: Songwriter; composer; musician; producer; arranger; video director
- Years active: 1970–present
- Musical career
- Genres: Pop; rock; jazz; blues; classical
- Instruments: Piano; keyboards
- Label: Warner Bros.
- Website: davidbluefield.com

David Bluefield is an American songwriter, composer, musician, producer, arranger, and video director. His song, "What's the Use," recorded by Mary MacGregor, was the "International Grand Prix Winner" as well as winning the "Most Outstanding Performance Award" at the World Popular Song Festival in 1980. He has recorded with Stevie Nicks and Tim Buckley and has shared the stage with Badfinger, Frank Zappa, Traffic, Alice Cooper, Paul Williams, and Paul Anka. He toured extensively with Three Dog Night and Mary MacGregor and was a band member of the music group, Kindred, who released two albums on Warner Bros. He wrote, produced, and directed, Music Has His Back: Leo Pearlstein, the 104-year-old Drummer, which won a Texas Short Film Festival Award for "Most Inspirational Film," an Audience Award at the Under 5 Minutes Film Festival for "Best Documentary".

== Early life ==
David Bluefield (David Bluefield Pearlstein) was born and raised in Hollywood, California. His father, Leo Pearlstein was a successful advertising executive, author, and jazz drummer. Bluefield attended Fairfax High School where he played in the rock band, "Potluck", who shared the stage with Traffic and Alice Cooper.

== Career ==
David Bluefield is songwriter, musician (piano/keyboards/organ) producer, arranger, and composer. He has released 15 studio albums and his genres have generally been classified as pop, rock, jazz, blues, and classical. Bluefield has played with the Platters, Steve Martin, Tracey Ullman, Three Dog Night, Paul Williams, Paul Anka, Iron Eyes Cody, and performed live with Ringo Starr.

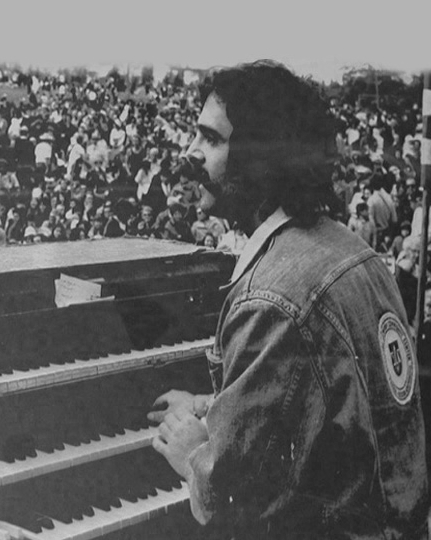
Bluefield Performing 1972

In the early 1970s he was a band member (piano, keyboards, organ) and the main songwriter in the music group, Kindred. They toured nationally and shared the stage with Three Dog Night and Badfinger, among others. They released two albums on Warner Bros., "Kindred" and "Next of Kin."

In 1977, Bluefield played the keyboard in Close Encounters of the Third Kind when the humans tried to communicate with the aliens in the spacecraft.

In 1978, Bluefield's co-write, "Memories," recorded by Mary MacGregor, was selected as one of Billboard's "Top Single Picks" and was included on her "Greatest Hits" album release in 1979. His co-write, "What's the Use," recorded by Mary MacGregor, was the "International Grand Prix Winner" as well as winning the "Most Outstanding Performance Award" at the World Popular Song Festival in 1980. Both singles were co-written with Marty Rodgers, whom Bluefield wrote and performed with for 10 years. Bluefield also toured with Mary Macgregor, playing keyboards and organ.

He played keyboards and drum machine on Stevie Nicks' hit single, Stand Back in 1983 and in 1984 won a Clio Award for producing the music for the Los Angeles Police Department's television commercial titled, "It Could Happen." In 1985, Bluefield played piano on The American Music Project (album), which included performances by Don McLean, Rita Coolidge, and Hoyt Axton, among others.

In 1995, he released albums, "Clazzual Sax" and "Reclassified" which received favorable reviews. In 1996, Bluefield released "Rolling Over the Classics." (album) and in 2020 released "Munchtime" (album).

Bluefield filmed his 103 year old musician father, (Leo Pearlstein) playing drums on "All of Me". (Bluefield played the piano) In 2024, he wrote, produced, and directed, Music Has His Back: Leo Pearlstein, the 104-year-old Drummer, which won an Audience Award at the Under 5 Minutes Film Festival for "Best Documentary" and was nominated for "Best Documentary" at the Couch Film Festival.

=== Discography ===
- 1970 - "Sweetness" (single) - Maurice Williams - songwriter
- 1971 - "Kindred" (album) - Kindred - songwriter, keyboards, organ
- 1972 - "Next of Kin" (album) - Kindred - songwriter, keyboards, organ
- 1975 - "Look at the Fool" (single) - Tim Buckley - clavinet
- 1975 - "Memories" (single) - Mary MacGregor - songwriter
- 1976 - "Framed" (single) - Cheech & Chong - performer
- 1977 - Close Encounters of the Third Kind - keyboards
- 1978 - "Hollywood Dodgers: Live Aspen CO 1978 Vol. II (Live)" - songwriter, keyboards
- 1980 - "What's the Use" (single) - Mary MacGregor - songwriter
- 1981 - "Stand Back" (single) - Stevie Nicks - Oberheim OB-Xa synthesizer and Oberheim DMX programming
- 1985 - "The American Music Project" - piano
- 1986 - Richard Simmons and the Silver Foxes (video) - music

=== Solo discography ===
- 1995 - "Clazzual Sax" (album) - Rhythm & Bluefield Band - composer, producer, arranger, piano, engineer
- 1995 - "Reclassified" (album) - Rhythm & Bluefield Band - composer, producer, arranger, piano, engineer
- 1996 - "Rolling Over The Classics" (album) - Rhythm & Bluefield Band - composer, arranger, producer, keyboards
- 2023 - "Munchtime" (album) - David Bluefield - composer, arranger, producer, keyboards
- 2023 - Rockin' Nursery Rhymes Singalong (album) - composer, arranger, producer, keyboards
- 2023 - Earth Idol - Rhythm & Bluesical (album) - composer, arranger, producer, keyboards
- 2023 - ArRanger in the Brainforest: Bite-Sized Instrumentals (album) - composer, arranger, producer, keyboards
- 2023 - Suite 1 from "5 Suites de Pandemica": On the Couch (album) - composer, arranger, producer, keyboards
- 2023 - Suite 2 from "5 Suites de Pandemica": From the Chair (album) - composer, arranger, producer, keyboards
- 2023 - Suite 3 from "5 Suites de Pandemica": By the Bed (album) - composer, arranger, producer, keyboards
- 2023 - Suite 4 from "5 Suites de Pandemica": In the Bath (album) composer, arranger, producer, keyboards
- 2023 - Suite 5 from "5 Suites de Pandemica": And Beyond (album) composer, arranger, producer, keyboards
- 2024 - Clazzax Trilogy 1: Clazzual Sax (album) - composer, arranger, producer, keyboards
- 2024 - Clazzax Trilogy 2: ReClassified (album) - composer, arranger, producer, keyboards
- 2024 - Clazzax Trilogy 3: Rolling Over the Classics (album) - composer, arranger, producer, keyboards
- 2024 - Jazz Me Up (with Stephen Cole) - Volume 1 - composer, arranger, producer, keyboards
- 2025 - Jazz Me Up (with Stephen Cole) - Volume 2 - composer, arranger, producer, keyboards
