= Cheez Doodles =

Cheese puff produced by Wise Foods

- A large bag of Cheez Doodles.
- Product type: Cheese puff
- Current owner: Wise Foods
- Country: United States
- Markets: North America
- Previous owners: King Kone Corp.; Borden, Inc.
- Website: cheezdoodles.com

Cheez Doodles are a cheese puff produced by Wise Foods. Originally developed and manufactured by King Kone Corp. of the Bronx, New York, it became the prevalent cheese puff snack on the East Coast.

== Description ==
Cheez Doodles are a cheese-flavored baked cheese puff made of extruded cornmeal and are similar to Frito-Lay's Cheetos and Herr's Cheese Curls. The snack was created by Morrie Yohai and is produced by Pennsylvania-based snack foods producer Wise Foods.

== History ==
Originally developed and manufactured by King Kone Corp. of the Bronx, Cheez Doodles were developed by the company's owner and operator, Morrie Yohai (1920–2010). King Kone had been founded in the 1920s and manufactured ice cream cones, cheese crackers, popcorn, and Melba toast. The company had a machine which could be used to produce three-inch lengths of extruded cornmeal. These were then baked with orange cheddar cheese powder and other flavorings to produce a new snack food. According to Yohai, the name "Cheez Doodles" came to him while he and other employees were sitting around a table sampling alternatives for the cheese flavoring of the new snack.

In the mid-1960s, the company (by then known as Old London Foods) was acquired by Borden and assigned to its Wise potato chip division. In 1997, KKR & Co. acquired a majority interest in Borden; in 2002, Palladium Equity Partners purchased Wise Foods.

Today, Wise Foods is owned by Arca Continental, the second-largest Coca-Cola bottler in Central and North America, who bought Wise in 2012. Cheez Doodles remain one of the strongest brands marketed by Wise with 15 million pounds (7 million kilograms) of the product produced in 2010.

== Varieties ==
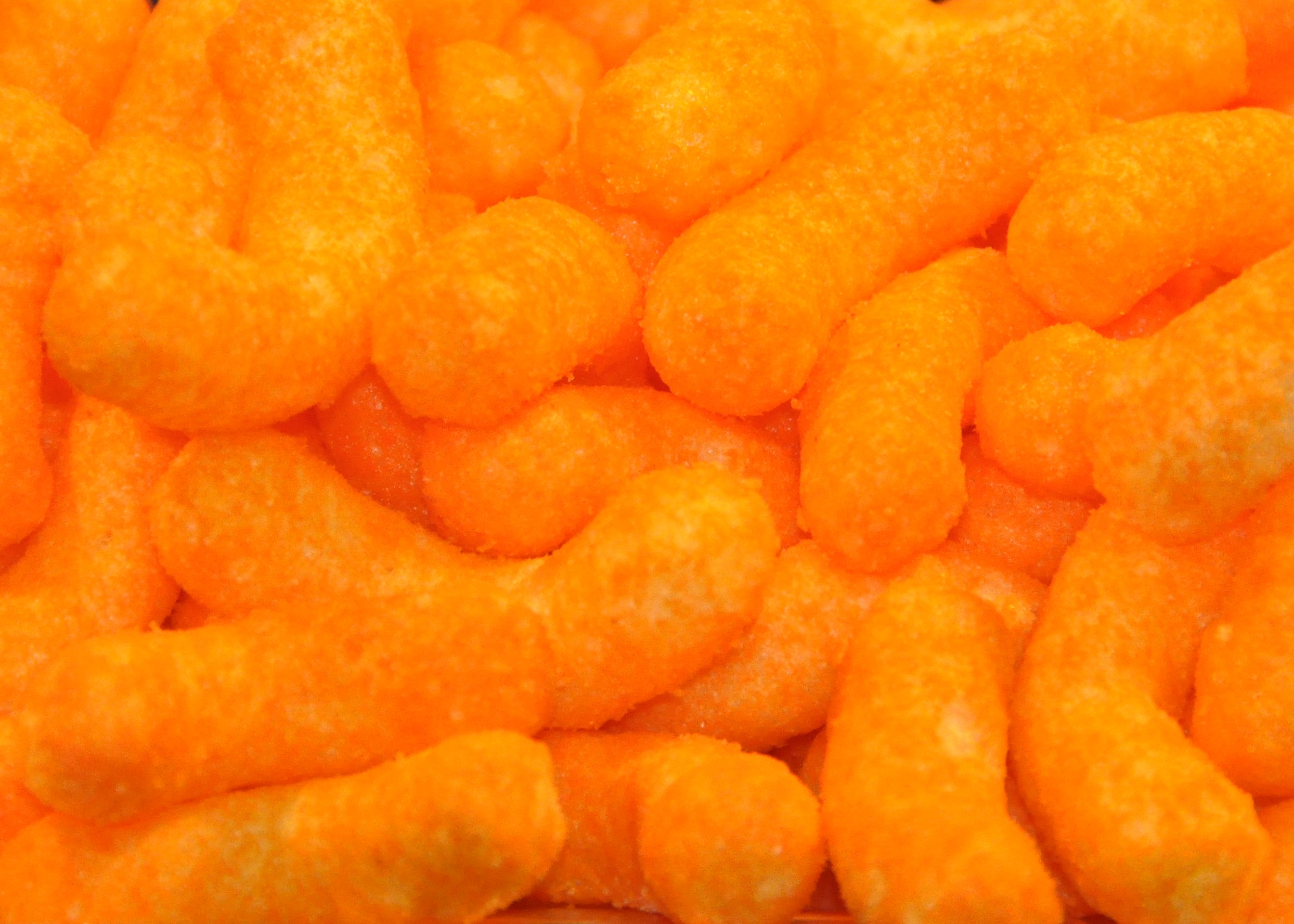
Close-up of Cheez Doodles

Cheez Doodles are produced in many varieties. Varieties available as of February 2022 were:

- Cheez Doodles Baked Puffs – original variety
- Cheez Doodles Baked Puffs White Cheddar – white cheddar puffed rather than yellow cheddar
- Cheez Doodles Baked Puffs Hot & Honey – honey and cheddar flavored
- Cheez Doodles Baked Puffs Honey BBQ – honey barbecue sauce flavored
- Cheez Doodles Baked Puffs Extra Cheesy – additional yellow cheddar cheese flavoring
- Cheez Doodles Extra Crunchy – hard, crunchy fried variety
- Cheez Doodles Baked Puffed Balls – spherical puff variety
- Cheez Doodles Baked Puffed Balls Jalapeño Poppers – spherical puffs with yellow cheddar with jalapeño flavoring

== In popular culture ==
In the comic strip Big Nate, Cheez Doodles are protagonist Nate Wright's favorite snack food.

Cheez Doodles are prominently featured in George R. R. Martin's short story, The Pear-Shaped Man.
