= Mrs. Cubbison's Foods =

Bakeries of the United States

Mrs. Cubbison's Foods is a company that specializes in stuffing products (also known as dressing). Founded in the U.S. in 1948 by Sophie Cubbison, Mrs. Cubbison's Foods has grown to include other products, such as croutons and meatloaf mix.

It was acquired by Hostess Brands in 1975, and is currently owned by Sugar Foods Corporation.

== History ==
The founder of Mrs. Cubbison's Foods, Sophie Cubbison was born in September 1890. Sophie was born on a lima bean ranch in San Marcos, California, as Sophie Huchting. (Her father was of German descent, and her mother a Californian of Mexican descent.) At the age of 16, Sophie began cooking for her father and brothers as well as the hired hands on the ranch during the summer and early fall to save money for college. She baked ‘black bread’ for the workers which is a bread made from 100% whole wheat flour. She learned the recipe from her father who had in turn learned it from his mother while they lived in Bockhorn, Germany. Sophie also baked cakes, doughnuts, cookies, cup cakes, pies, puddings and stewed fruits.

Sophie attended California Polytechnic State University (San Luis Obispo) and graduated with a degree in home economics in 1912.

Sophie met Harry G. Cubbison and married him in 1916, changing her name from Sophie Huchting to Sophie Cubbison. Her father had died previously and Sophie now supported her mother on $30 a month.

Sophie and Harry became partners in a bread business with Harry acting as the salesman and deliveryman and Sophie doing all of the baking. They purchased a small bakery and added a small mill to grind the wheat flour. Sophie would travel to different stores and delicatessens to demonstrate the bread. At home, she would experiment with Melba toast.

In 1925, Sophie and Harry sold the bread business and started Mrs. Cubbison's Melba toast and Zwieback. In 1925, The Mayo Brothers prescribed the “Eighteen Day Reducing Diet” to Ethel Barrymore which included Melba toast. Sophie and Harry's products were high in demand. Because Sophie used Melba toast for her own cooking when she breaded or stuffed meats and vegetables, she decided to introduce a new line of Melba toasted, all-purpose prepared Poultry Dressing and Corn Bread Stuffing.

Sophie Cubbison retired in 1955, but remained a consultant to the company. She died at the age of 92 in November 1982.

Mrs. Cubbison's Foods produces stuffing, turkey brines, croutons and meatloaf mix.
