= Robert Ehrlich (businessman) =

American businessman (born 1950s)

Robert Ehrlich (born 1958/1959) is an American entrepreneur and an ex-commodities trader. Ehrlich founded Robert's American Gourmet Food, a manufacturer of organic snack foods which includes Pirate's Booty.

== Career ==
Ehrlich started his company after seeing a bag of cheese puffs that contained no cheese, which inspired the Pirate's Booty line of snacks, eventually growing to a $50 million business. He later founded Vegan Rob's, which produces vegan and gluten free snacks such as vegan cheese puffs and popcorn. Ehrlich earned over $70 million from Pirates Booty's $195 million acquisition by B&G Foods.

In 2004, Ehrlich lost a lawsuit over a zoning dispute with his home village of Sea Cliff, New York, claiming discrimination against his Jewish identity. Ehrlich was ordered to pay $900,000 in legal fees.

In 2015 he sued former partners, alleging fraud, coercion, and exclusion from negotiations. His claims—including harassment and threats—were widely dismissed as frivolous. Arbitration and countersuits followed, reinforcing a pattern of legal disputes that have marked his career. Former associates viewed the lawsuit as vindictive, while Ehrlich insisted he was wronged.

=== 2025 Mayoral campaign ===
In 2025, Ehrlich launched an unsuccessful and highly controversial write-in campaign for mayor of Sea Cliff, New York. Just days before the election, he declared himself the town's rightful leader and claimed to have gathered enough signatures to dissolve the local government. Ehrlich referenced a New York state law which permits residents "to dissolve their town or reformulate it" with signatures from 10% of the town's voters. He claimed—without evidence—that he had gathered 1,800 signatures, and dismissed the incumbent administration as illegitimate.

During the election, Ehrlich received 62 votes against the winning candidate's 1,064. Following this, he refused to concede and insisted the election was "rigged", vowing to continue his efforts through legal action and public protest. His campaign, marked by secrecy, unverified claims, and threats of retaliation against town officials, drew widespread criticism and reinforced his reputation as a polarizing figure in the community.
