= Spice Islands (brand) =

American brand of spices and herbs

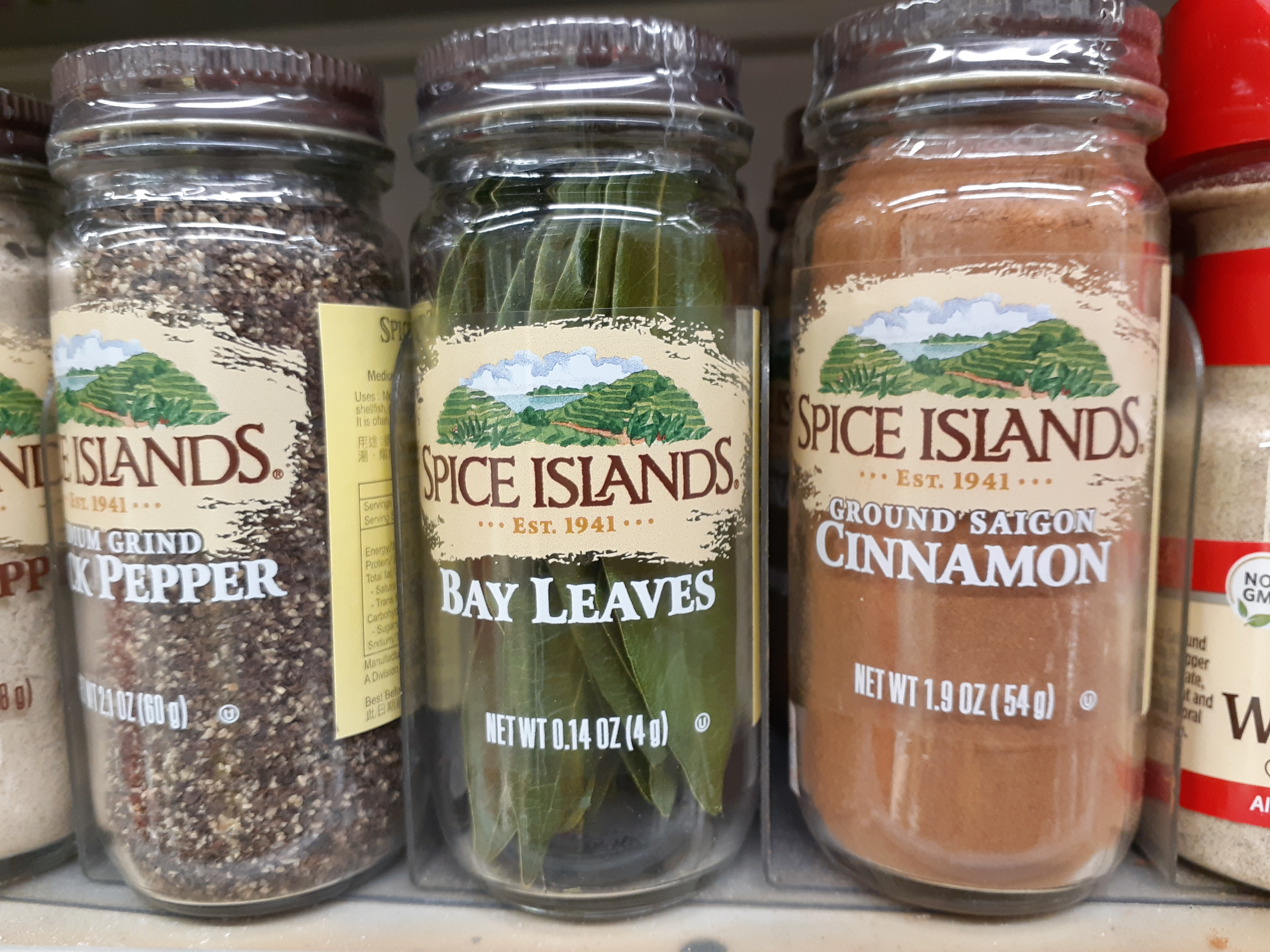
Spice Islands spices on a grocery store shelf.

Spice Islands is an American brand of spices and herbs that began in 1941. The spices are manufactured in Ankeny, Iowa, the largest spice manufacturing facility in the world. The brand is owned by B&G Foods, Inc.

The company's name is taken from the famous "Spice Islands" of Indonesia, a.k.a. the Maluku Islands, which are the original home of many famous spices such as nutmeg and cloves.
