= Peach Melba =

Peach and ice cream dessert

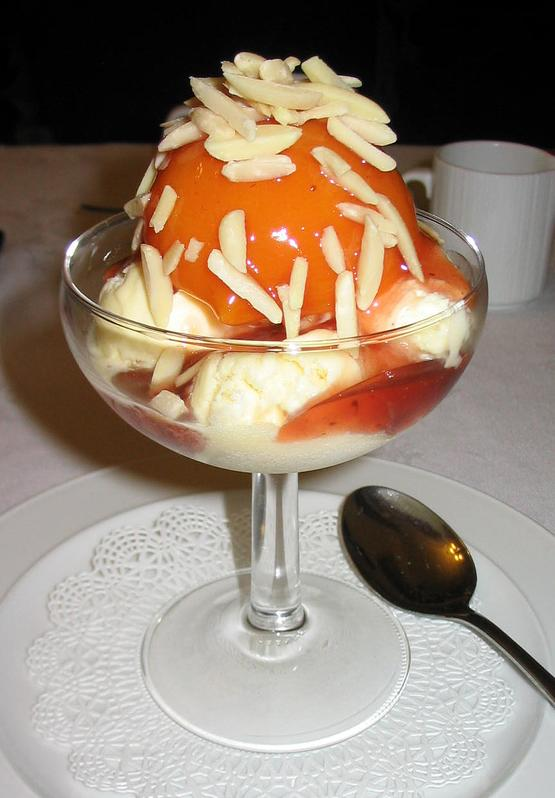
- Type: Dessert
- Created by: Auguste Escoffier
- Main ingredients: Peaches, raspberry sauce, vanilla ice cream

Peach Melba (French: pêche Melba, pronounced [pɛʃ mɛlba]) is a dessert of peaches and raspberry sauce with vanilla ice cream. It was invented in 1892 or 1893 by the French chef Auguste Escoffier at the Savoy Hotel, London, to honour the Australian soprano Nellie Melba.

== History ==
In 1892, operatic soprano Nellie Melba was performing in Wagner's opera Lohengrin at Covent Garden. The Duke of Orléans gave a dinner party at the Savoy to celebrate her triumph. For the occasion, Escoffier presented Nellie with a dessert of fresh peaches served over vanilla ice cream in a silver dish perched atop an ice sculpture of a swan, which is featured in the opera. He originally called the dish Pêche au cygne, or "peach with a swan."

A few years later Escoffier created a new version of the dessert: when Escoffier and César Ritz opened the Ritz Carlton in London (after both were sacked from the Savoy for alleged larceny, embezzlement, and fraud), Escoffier changed the recipe slightly by adding a topping of sweetened raspberry purée and renamed the dish Pêche Melba.

== Variations ==
Other versions substitute pears, apricots, or strawberries instead of peaches or use raspberry sauce or melted redcurrant jelly instead of raspberry purée. The original dessert used simple ingredients of "tender and very ripe peaches, vanilla ice cream, and a purée of sugared raspberry". Escoffier himself is quoted as saying, "Any variation on this recipe ruins the delicate balance of its taste."

=== Pijama ===
Peach Melba is claimed to be the ancestor of the pijama, a dessert in Catalan cuisine. 7 Portes, a famous restaurant in Barcelona founded in 1836, is credited with its creation in 1951, when officers of the U.S. Sixth Fleet stationed in the nearby harbor would often dine at 7 Portes and order peach Melba for dessert. The name mutated to pijama ([pi.ˈʒa.mə], Catalan for pajamas) among the Catalan-speaking kitchen staff. From there the recipe, or the essence of it, spread throughout Catalonia. Variations are countless, but ice cream, flan, and fruit in syrup (peach or pineapple) are its staple ingredients.

Though regarded as an extravagant and somewhat outdated dish today, the pijama was considered part of the corpus of the Catalan cuisine and its recipe was included in the inventory published by the Foundation of the Catalan Institute of Cuisine and Gastronomical Culture.

== Cultural significance ==
In tribute to Escoffier an elaborate deconstruction of the peach Melba was served as the last dish at El Bulli prior to its closure in 2012.

Peaches and icecream subsequently became a staple desert item in homes across Australia. Other fruit amd icecream also joined peaches in popularity, depending on location and seasonality.

== See also ==
- List of foods named after people
- Melba toast
