= B&G Foods =

American branded foods holding company

B&G Foods, Inc.
- Formerly: B Companies Holdings Corp. (1996–1997); B&G Foods Holdings Corp. (1997–2004)
- Type: Public
- Traded as: NYSE: BGS
- Industry: Food
- Predecessor: Bloch & Guggenheimer
- Founded: 1996; 30 years ago
- Headquarters: Parsippany, New Jersey, U.S.
- Areas served: United States; Canada; Puerto Rico
- Key people: Stephen C. Sherrill (chairman); Robert “Rob” D. Mills (president and CEO); Debra Martin Chase (board member)
- Revenue: ▲US$1,968 million (2020)
- Net income: ▲US$132 million (2020)
- Total assets: ▲US$3,768 million (2020)
- Total equity: ▲US$831,877 (2020)
- Number of employees: 3,207 (2021)
- Website: bgfoods.com

B&G Foods, Inc. is an American branded foods holding company based in Parsippany, New Jersey. The company was formed in 1996 to acquire Bloch & Guggenheimer, a Manhattan-based producer of pickles, relish and condiments which had been founded in 1889.

B&G has been publicly traded since 2007 and its primary growth strategy is to acquire "orphaned" brands, those which no longer fit with their parent company's primary business. The company made 20 acquisitions between 1997 and 2017 and as of 2018 held 51 brands, mostly frozen and shelf-stable food.

== History ==
=== Precursors ===
The "B&G" name began in 1889 when two immigrants, Joseph Bloch and Julius Guggenheimer, started a pickle company, Bloch & Guggenheimer, Inc., in Manhattan. In its early days, B&G built a large pickle plant in Long Island City, Queens which the company operated until the 1970s when it moved production to Maryland. B&G produced pickles, relish, and other condiments under the B&G brand and by the 1980s they had become a significant retail and foodservice supplier in the New York City area.

In the 1980s, Dutch conglomerate Artal NV bought several North American food companies including B&G and M. Polaner, Inc. Leonard S. Polaner, who had led his family's business prior to its acquisition, was appointed president overseeing both companies. Polaner hired former Johnson & Johnson executive David Wenner to manage B&G. However, starting in March 1993, Artal began to sell off its food products starting with Polaner selling it to American Home Products for US$67.5 million.

In June 1993 an investment group led by Robert Bass and Dallas leveraged buyout specialists Haas, Wheat & Partners founded Specialty Foods Corp. to buy Artal's eight remaining North American food companies for US$1.1 billion. These included B&G, Mother's Cookies, cheese producer Stella Foods of Green Bay, and Oakland-based Pacific Coast Baking Co., owner of San Francisco French Bread Co. and Gai's Seattle French Baking Co. Both Polaner and Wenner took executive positions with Specialty. However, two years later, after suffering a loss of US$165 million in 1995, the heavily leveraged Specialty decided to focus on its bread and cheese businesses and began selling other holdings.

=== Foundation and early history ===
A group of New York investors, Bruckmann, Rosser, Sherrill & Co., with assistance from Polaner and Wenner formed B Companies Holdings Corp. in 1996. The purpose of the company was to buy Bloch & Guggenheimer and snack foods producer Burns & Ricker, Inc. from Specialty. In 1997, following these successful acquisitions, the company took the name of its more notable subsidiary and was renamed B&G Foods Holdings Corp. Polaner became B&G's chairman and Wenner its president and CEO.

B&G immediately began acquiring additional food companies starting in June 1997 with several brands from Nabisco. These included Regina wine vinegar, Brer Rabbit molasses, Wright’s liquid smoke, and Vermont Maid syrups. In August it bought Louisiana-based Trappey’s Fine Foods, maker of Trappey's Hot Sauce and Red Devil hot sauces and pickled peppers, from McIlhenny Company.

Following a year of positive financial performance from the brands it had already acquired, B&G bought maple syrup and salad dressing producer Maple Grove Farms of Vermont and its natural foods brand Up Country Naturals in July 1998. In early 1999, B&G chairman Polaner was reunited with his family business when B&G acquired the Polaner All Fruit line of jams, jellies and preserves for US$30 million. American Home had placed Polaner under a subsidiary, International Home Foods, majority control of which had been acquired by a leveraged buyout firm in 1996.

In a transaction that significantly increased the size of the company, B&G bought six brands from Pillsbury Company for US$192 million in 1999. These included B&M Baked Beans, Ac'cent and Sa-son Ac'cent flavor enhancers, Las Palmas Mexican food, Joan of Arc canned beans, and Underwood meat spreads. Pillsbury at the time said it was selling these brands so it could focus on its larger brands including Green Giant. While it continued to integrate these companies, B&G began a new line of business collaborating with chef Emeril Lagasse to develop the "Emeril's Original" brand of products.

After lackluster sales growth of just 4.6% in 2000 and significant long-term debt, B&G decided to sell off its Burns & Ricker business. Burns & Ricker had been one of 5 subsidiaries to see a decrease in sales that year and was sold to Nonnie's Food Company, Inc. in January 2001. By 2003, B&G was ready to start buying again and acquired the Ortega brand of Mexican chiles and sauces from Nestlé.

=== Reorganization ===
In October 2004, B&G Foods Holdings Corp. became B&G Foods, Inc. having merged its then-subsidiary B&G Foods into the parent company. In 2007, the company began trading on the New York Stock Exchange with ticker symbol "BGS".

The company acquired Grandma's Molasses from Mott’s Company in 2006 and Cream of Wheat from Kraft Foods in 2007. In 2010 it acquired the brands of Violet Packing including Sclafani and Don Pepino tomato products. This was followed a year later by its 2011 acquisition of the Culver Specialty Brands division from Unilever for US$325 million. The Culver purchase included the Mrs. Dash (rebranded "Dash" in 2020), Molly McButter, Sugar Twin sugar substitute, and Baker's Joy baking spray with flour brands all of which Unilever had acquired when it bought The Alberto Culver Company. The purchase also included the Static Guard, and Kleen Guard brands of furniture polish, B&G's first non-food brands.

B&G acquired snack food brands Old London Foods, with its sub-brands Devonsheer and JJ Flats, and New York Style along with a manufacturing facility in Yadkinville, North Carolina from Chipita America in 2012 for US$62.5 million. In 2013 it acquired Rickland Orchards for US$57 million, the TrueNorth brand of nut snacks from DeMet's Candy Company, and Robert's American Gourmet Food (better known as "Pirate Brands") and its Pirate's Booty, Smart Puffs, and Original Tings snack brands for US$195 million.

In 2014, B&G bought Westbury, New York-based Specialty Brands of America from private equity firm American Capital for US$155 million. Specialty Brands' largest holding was the dry soup, pasta, and rice producer Bear Creek Country Kitchens. The purchase also included the Spring Tree, Cary's, and MacDonald's brands of maple and pancake syrup, New York Flatbreads, and Canoleo margarine. In its largest acquisition at the time, B&G acquired Green Giant and its associated brands Le Sueur and Le Sieur from General Mills in 2015. By the following year, B&G had expanded Green Giant's offerings with 25 new frozen vegetable products. In July 2016, B&G announced it would be moving production of pizza crust producer Mama Mary's, acquired in 2015, from its Spartanburg, South Carolina facilities to consolidate it into B&G's Yadkinville operations.

The spice and seasonings business of ACH Food Companies, a division of Associated British Foods, was acquired in November 2016 for US$365 million. This brought B&G the Spice Islands, Tone's, and Durkee brands of spices and a licensing agreement to produce Weber brand sauces and seasonings. It also included a manufacturing facility in Ankeny, Iowa. Also in 2016, B&G bought pasta and sauce maker Victoria Fine Foods for US$70 million. Back to Nature Foods, along with its Snackwell's brand, was acquired for US$162.5 million in 2017 from Mondelez International. In December 2022, B&G sold Back to Nature to Barilla.

In October 2018, B&G sold Pirate Brands to Hershey for US$420 million in an all-cash deal.

In May 2019, B&G acquired baking ingredients producer Clabber Girl Corporation for US$80 million from Hulman & Company, owners of INDYCAR and the Indianapolis Motor Speedway. Clabber Girl produces baking powder, baking soda, corn starch, gelatins, and puddings under the Clabber Girl, Rumford, Davis, Hearth Club, and Royal brands. The next year, B&G bought the Crisco brand of cooking oils and shortening along with its manufacturing facility in Cincinnati, Ohio from The J.M. Smucker Company for approximately US$550 million. Also in 2020, B&G bought Wellesley, Massachusetts-based frozen vegan foods producer Farmwise Farms with a goal of complementing its existing Green Giant frozen vegetable products.

Kenneth C. "Casey" Keller was appointed B&G's president and CEO in June 2021 replacing interim president and CEO David L. Wenner who remained a board member. Keller had previously held leadership roles at various major foods brands including JDE Peet's, Peet's Coffee, Wrigley Company, Alberto-Culver, and Heinz. Wenner, who had led B&G from 1993 to 2014, took on the interim role following the 2020 resignation of Kenneth Romanzi.

In an effort to reduce costs and improve productivity, the company announced in August 2021 it would sell its Portland, Maine manufacturing facility. The plant had produced B&M products for over 100 years, Underwood products for over 50 years, and other B&G brands following B&M's acquisition. The facility's 86 employees were to be laid off and manufacturing operations moved to third-party and other B&G locations. The sale was expected to close by the end of 2021 with B&G's operational move completed by the first quarter of 2022. Following the sale, the facility would become the home of The Roux Institute at Northeastern University.

Robert “Rob” D. Mills was appointed B&G's president and CEO in August 2026.

== B&G brands ==
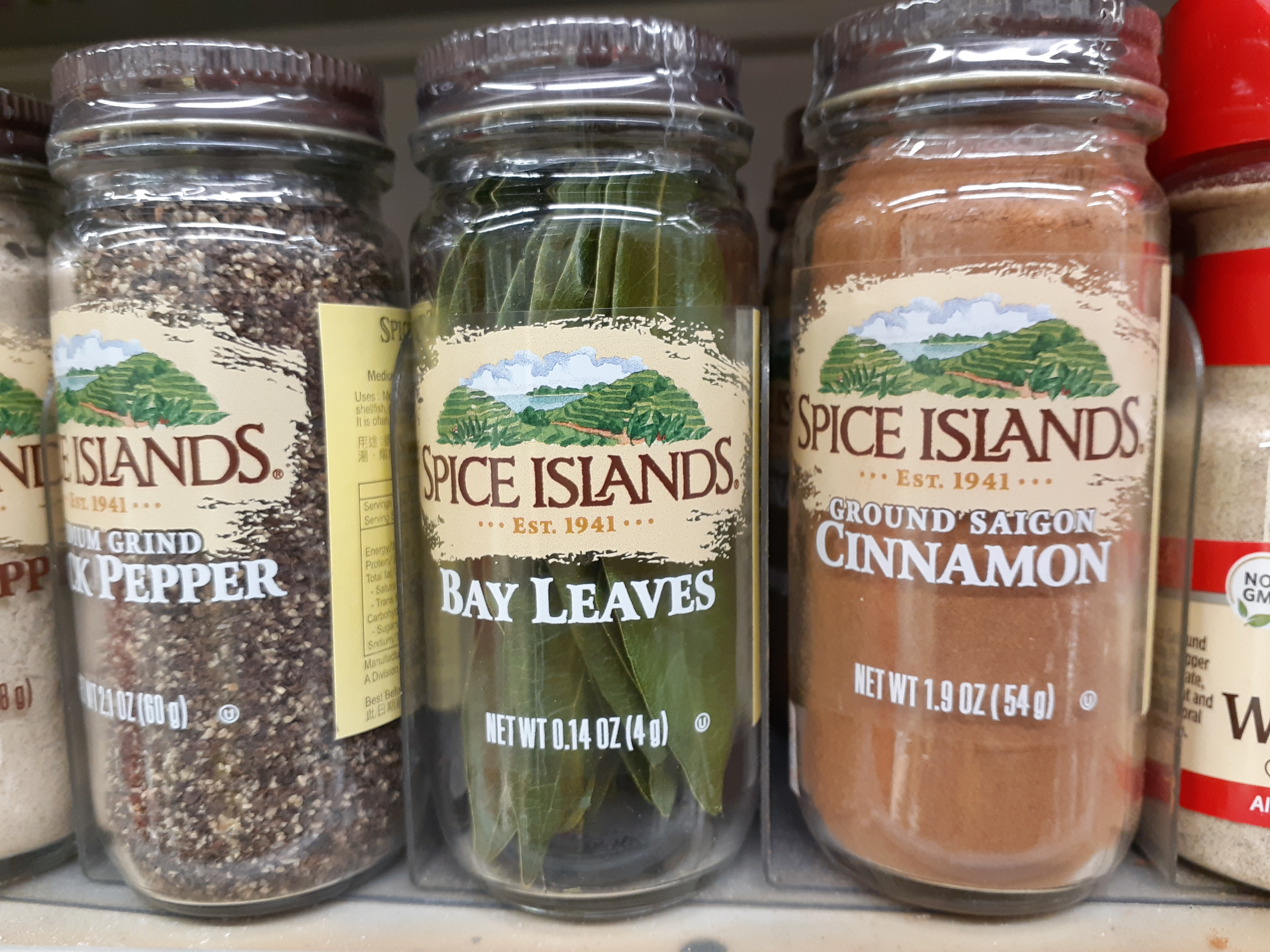
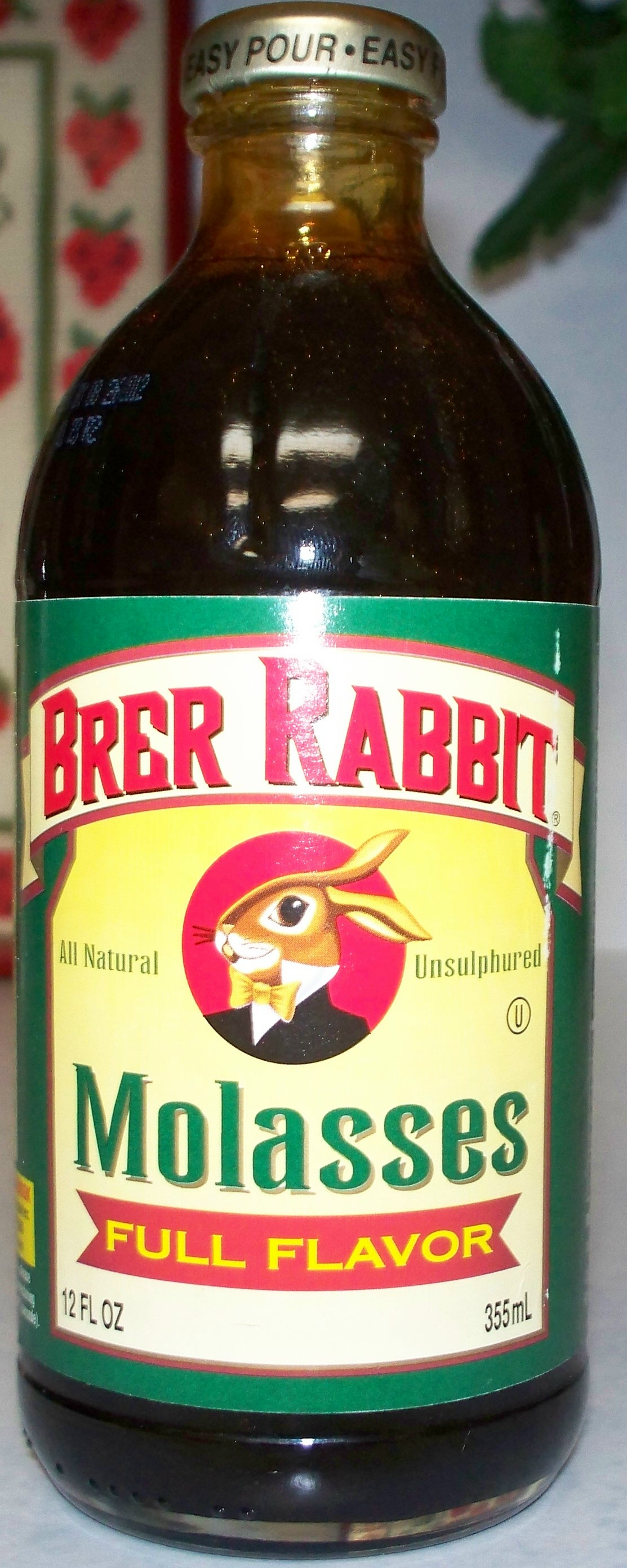
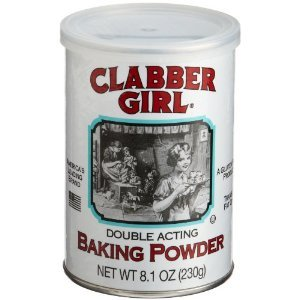
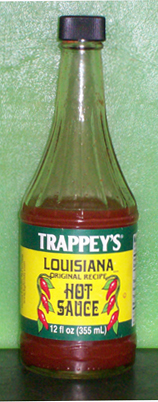
Various B&G brands. Clockwise from upper left: Spice Islands spices, a Brer Rabbit bottle of molasses, a bottle of Trappey's Louisiana Hot Sauce, and a tin of Clabber Girl Baking Powder.

B&G's portfolio includes a wide variety of brands:

- Ac'cent
  - Sa-són Ac'cent
- B&G Pickles
- B&M Baked Beans
- Baker's Joy
- Bear Creek Country Kitchens
- Brer Rabbit
- Buena Vida
- Canoleo
- Cary's
- Clabber Girl
- College Inn
- Cream of Wheat
  - Cream of Rice
- Crisco
- Dash (formerly Mrs. Dash)
- Davis
- Dec-A-Cake
- Devonsheer
- Don Pepino
- Durkee
- Farmwise Farms
- Fleischmann's
- Grandma's Molasses
- Hearth Club
- Henri's
- JJ Flats
- Joan of Arc
- KC
- Kitchen Basics
- Las Palmas
- Le Sueur
  - Le Sieur
- MacDonald's
- Mama Mary's
- Maple Grove Farms of Vermont
- McCann's Steel Cut Irish Oatmeal
- Molly McButter
- Mrs. Fanning's Bread & Butter Pickles
- New York Flatbreads
- New York Style
- Old London
- Ortega
- Polaner
- Regina
- Rickland Orchards
- Royal
- Rumford
- Sclafani
- Snackwell's
- Spice Islands
- Spring Tree
- Static Guard
- Sugar Twin
- Tone's
- Trappey's Hot Sauce
  - Trappey's Red Devil
- TrueNorth
- Underwood
- Up Country Naturals
- Vermont Maid Syrup
- Victoria
- Wright's Liquid Smoke

B&G also produces products under brands licensed from other companies including Cinnamon Toast Crunch, Crock-Pot, Einstein Bros. Bagels, Emeril's Original, Skinnygirl, Twix, and Weber.

== Controversies ==
=== Cream of Wheat branding ===
B&G's Cream of Wheat was one of a number of brands subject to public pressure to change its branding due to perceived racist origins during the 2020 protests around racism. From its inception, the brand's packaging and marketing featured an African American chef character named "Rastus", a pejorative term for black men. B&G announced an "immediate review" of Cream of Wheat branding in June 2020 and in September said it would be removing the character from all Cream of Wheat packaging.
