= Melba toast =

Dry, crisp toast, often served with soup or salad

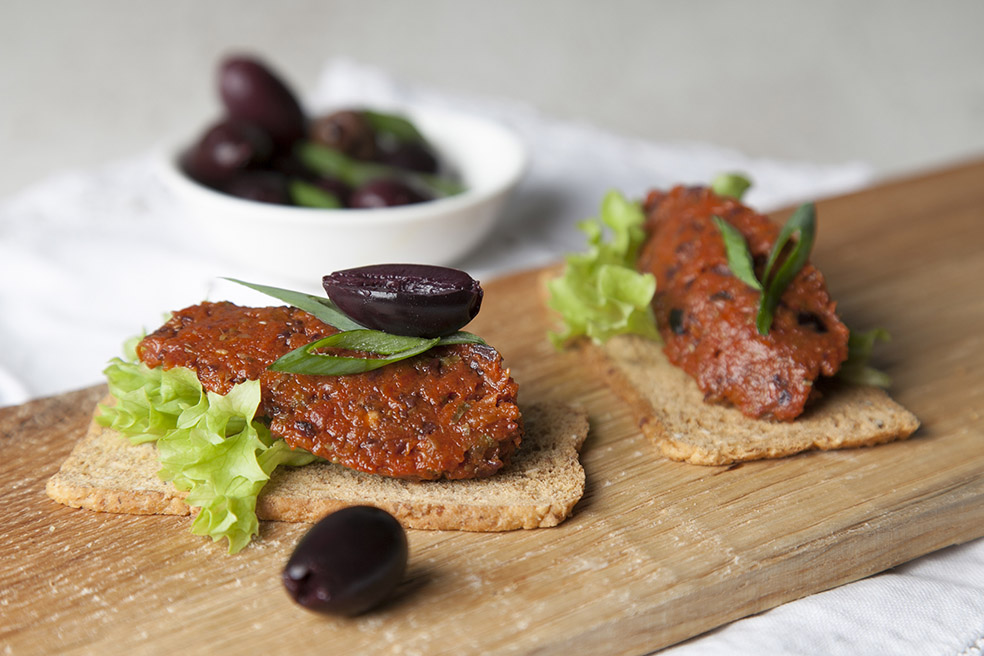
- Melba toast with olive tapenade
- Type: Toast
- Course: Appetizer
- Place of origin: United Kingdom
- Created by: Auguste Escoffier
- Main ingredients: Bread

Melba toast is a dry, crisp and thinly sliced rusk, often served with soup and salad or topped with either melted cheese or pâté. It is named after Dame Nellie Melba, the stage name of Australian opera singer Helen Porter Mitchell. Its name is thought to date from 1897, when the singer was very ill and it became a staple of her diet. The toast was created for her by a chef who was also a fan of hers, Auguste Escoffier, who also created the peach Melba dessert for her. The hotel proprietor César Ritz supposedly named it in a conversation with Escoffier.

Melba toast is made by lightly toasting slices of bread under a grill, on both sides. The resulting toast is then sliced laterally. These thin slices are then returned to the grill with the untoasted sides towards the heat source, resulting in toast half the normal thickness.

Melba toast is also available commercially, and was at one time given to infants who were teething as a hard food substance on which to chew. In the UK, this is similar to a commercial product known as French toast, although it is very different from the egg-based dish known as French toast in the USA.

In France, it is referred to as croutes en dentelle.

== History ==
In 1925, the Mayo Brothers prescribed the "Eighteen Day Reducing Diet" to Ethel Barrymore. It included Melba toast, which made the toast very popular at the time. Melba toast was also eaten as a component of the Banting diet.

== See also ==
- List of breads
- List of foods named after people
- List of toast dishes
- List of twice-baked foods
- Mrs. Cubbison's Foods
- Old London Foods
