= Wise Foods =

American snack foods producer

Wise Foods, Inc.
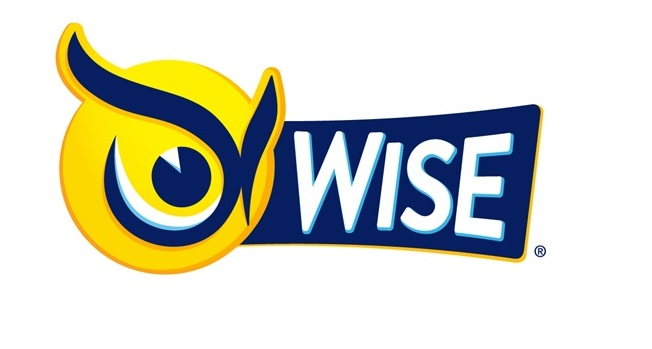

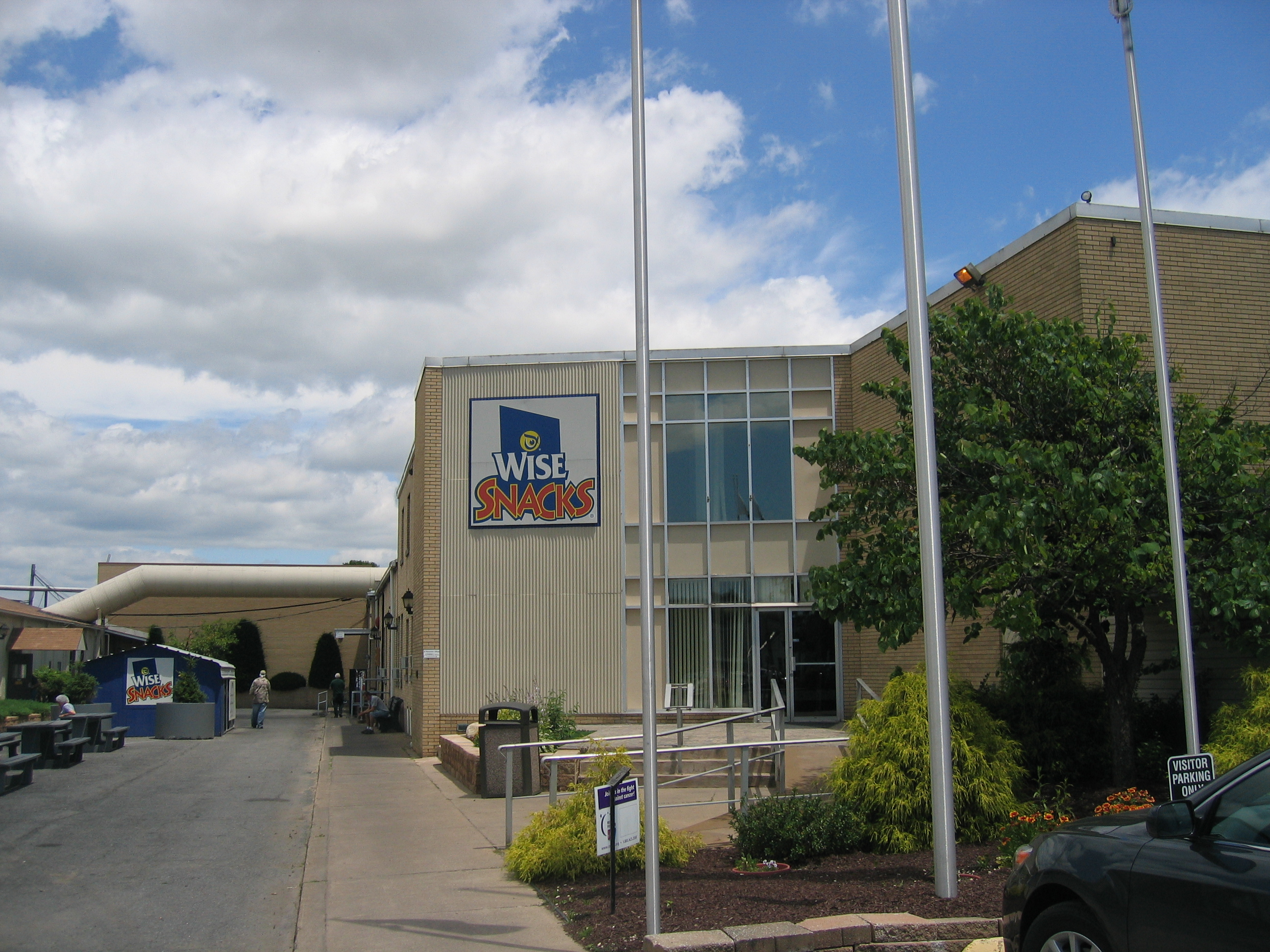
- Entrance to the corporate headquarters, 2009
- Formerly: Wise Potato Chip Company
- Company type: Private
- Industry: Food
- Founded: 1921; 105 years ago
- Founder: Earl Wise
- Headquarters: Berwick, Pennsylvania, U.S.
- Products: Potato chips, tortilla chips, ridgies, nachos, popcorn
- Brands: Cheez Doodles; Dipsies
- Parent: Arca Continental
- Website: wisesnacks.com

Wise Foods, Inc. is a company based in Berwick, Pennsylvania, that makes snacks and sells them through retail food outlets in 15 eastern seaboard states, as well as Vermont, Ohio, West Virginia, Kentucky, Tennessee, and Washington, D.C. Best known for its several varieties of potato chips, Wise also offers Cheez Doodles, bagged popcorn, tortilla chips, pork rinds, onion rings, Dipsy Doodle chips, nachos, Quinlan brand pretzels, and French onion dips.

Wise formerly made Cheez Waffies, but the product has since been discontinued.

In 2012, Wise Foods was acquired by the Mexican company Arca Continental.

== History ==
=== 20th century ===
Wise Foods was founded in 1921 in Berwick, Pennsylvania by Earl Wise and was initially called the Wise Potato Chip Company. Wise owned Wise Delicatessen and began making potato chips as a way to make use of excess potatoes, initially cooking them in his mother's kitchen, and then selling them to customers in brown paper bags. At the time, potato chips were generally kept in glass display cases, or cracker barrels, and scooped into paper bags for customers. The bags developed grease spots and did not keep the chips fresh for very long, eventually leading to the development of waxed paper bags. Wise's chips proved an immediate hit with customers and soon the delicatessen owner became a regional potato chip mogul. He decided on an owl as a company mascot, a creature reputed to be "wise," the stylized eye of which remains the corporate logo. He had his first delivery truck by 1922 and opened his first production plant in 1925.

In 1964, the company passed out of the Wise family, when it was acquired by the Borden Condensed Milk Co. In 1968 Wise Potato Chip company, which then sold popcorn, Cheez Doodles, Bravos Tortilla Chips, and other snack foods changed its name to Wise Foods, Inc. In 1989 Wise acquired Moore's Quality Snack Foods, which also produced salty snacks marketing mostly in Virginia and the Carolinas.

In 1994, Borden agreed to sell Wise and Moore's to the Pittsburgh Food & Beverage Company, and though the purchase was never completed, the fraudulent behavior the prospective buyers used to try to finance the deal precipitated the collapse of the Pittsburgh-based conglomerate.

=== 21st century ===
In October 2000, the company was bought by New York City-based investment firm of Palladium Equity Partners L.L.C. for $96 million.

Wise made some changes in the 2000s to improve its competitiveness. It closed the Quinlan Pretzel Co. plant in Denver, Pennsylvania, in 2002 and contracted with another area company to make pretzels under the Quinlan name.

In 2004, Palladium began efforts to help Wise cut into Frito-Lay's share in Wise's key markets, including new packaging for all of its products. Much of the money would be spent on the New York City metropolitan area, Wise's largest market. In the summer of 2005 Wise financed a three-year sponsorship deal to become the Official Potato Chip of the New York Mets. It upped the ante to become the Official Potato Chip and Cheez Doodle of the New York Mets by 2015.

In 2012, Wise Foods was acquired by the Mexican company Arca Continental, the second largest Coca-Cola bottler in Latin America and number three in the world. Arca, which owns several Mexican snack companies, is seeking to leverage Wise's reputation and market presence to introduce its Mexican snacks where Wise has a presence.

The following year, in 2013, the company moved its headquarters from Parsippany, New Jersey, to Atlanta, Georgia.

In 2015, Jolie Weber, the company's CFO at the time, was named CEO.
