= List of Conagra brands =

This article is a list of brands under the North American packaged foods company Conagra Brands, Inc.

== Conagra brands ==
- Act II – microwave popcorn
- Alexia – appetizers, artisan breads, and potato products
- Andy Capp's – flavored corn and potato snack made to look like French fries
- Angela Mia – tomato products and authentic Italian specialties
- Angie's – ready to snack popcorn
- Armour Star – canned meats
- Award Cuisine – food service specialties that cross dayparts and temperature classes
- Banquet – frozen chicken and ready-to-heat meals
- Bernstein's Dressings
- Bertolli – Italian-style olive oil
- Big Mama Sausage – snack-sized preserved sausages
- BIGS – flavored sunflower seeds and pumpkin seeds
- Birds Eye – frozen foods
- Blue Bonnet – margarine and bread spreads
- Brooks – beans and chili
- Celeste – frozen pizza
- Chiffon margarine – tubbed soft-margarine brand purchased from Kraft and later discontinued
- Chun King – Chinese-style foods and meal packages
- ConAgra Mills – multi-use flours
- Cream – corn starch
- Crunch 'n Munch – glazed popcorn/nut mixture
- David Sunflower Seeds – sunflower seeds and pumpkin seeds
- Dennison's – chili
- Duke's – meat snacks
- Duncan Hines – cake mixes
- Eagle Mills with Ultragrain – all-purpose flour made with ultragrain
- Egg Beaters – processed egg product
- Fernando's – Mexican entrees and appetizers
- Fiddle Faddle – glazed popcorn/nut mixture
- Fleischmann's – bread spreads
- Fraser Farm - canned meatballs with gravy
- Frontera Foods-Mexican products from chef Rick Bayless
- Gardein – meatless meals and snacks
- Gebhardt – Tex-Mex style foods
- Golden Cuisine – ready-made food for seniors
- Gulden's – mustard
- Healthy Choice – ready-to-eat and prepared foods
- Hebrew National – kosher sausages, cold cuts and condiments
- Hungry-Man – frozen TV dinner
- Hunt's – canned tomato products, ketchup and barbecue sauce
- Hunt's Snack Pack – shelf-stable pudding
- J. Hungerford Smith – dessert ingredients for restaurants
- J.M. Swank – food ingredients
- Jiffy Pop – popcorn
- Kid Cuisine – prepared foods for children
- Krusteaz - frozen pancakes/waffles/french toast
- La Choy – Chinese-style foods
- Lender's – frozen bagels
- Lightlife – vegetarian meat product substitutes (sold in 2013)
- Log Cabin Syrup
- Luck's Incorporated – canned baked beans
- Mama Ginellis – canned ready-to-eat pasta meals
- Manwich – canned sloppy Joe mix
- Margherita – Italian-style processed meats
- The MAX – pizzeria-quality products for food service operators
- Milwaukee's Pickles
- Mrs. Butterworth's – pancake syrup and mixes
- Mrs. Paul's – frozen seafood
- Move Over Butter – margarine
- Nalley – canned chili, condiments
- Odom's Tennessee Pride – breakfast sausage
- Open Pit – barbecue sauce
- Orville Redenbacher's – popcorn
- PAM – spray cooking oils
- Parkay – bread spreads
- Patio – Tex-Mex-style frozen meals
- Pemmican – beef and turkey jerky
- Penrose – pickled sausages
- Pogo – corn dogs
- Poppycock – premium glazed popcorn/nut mixture
- Puritan – ready-to-eat stews
- Ranch Style – baked and refried beans
- Reddi-wip – whipped cream
- Ro-Tel – canned tomato sauce
- Rosarita – Mexican-style foods
- Screaming Yellow Zonkers – glazed popcorn (discontinued)
- Slim Jim – meat snacks
- Smart Balance – butter, mayonnaise and cooking oil
- Squeez 'N Go – prepared pudding
- Swanson – frozen TV dinner
- Swiss Miss – powdered cocoa for hot chocolate and pudding
- Udi's Gluten Free – gluten free bread products
- Van Camp's – canned beans
- Van de Kamp's – frozen seafood
- VH – sauces and frozen foods (available in Canada only)
- Vlasic – pickles
- Vogel Popcorn – popcorn
- Wendy's canned chili with beans
- Wish-Bone – salad dressing
- Wolf Brand Chili – chili

== See also ==
- List of brand name food products
