= Lincoln Snacks Company =

American snack food company

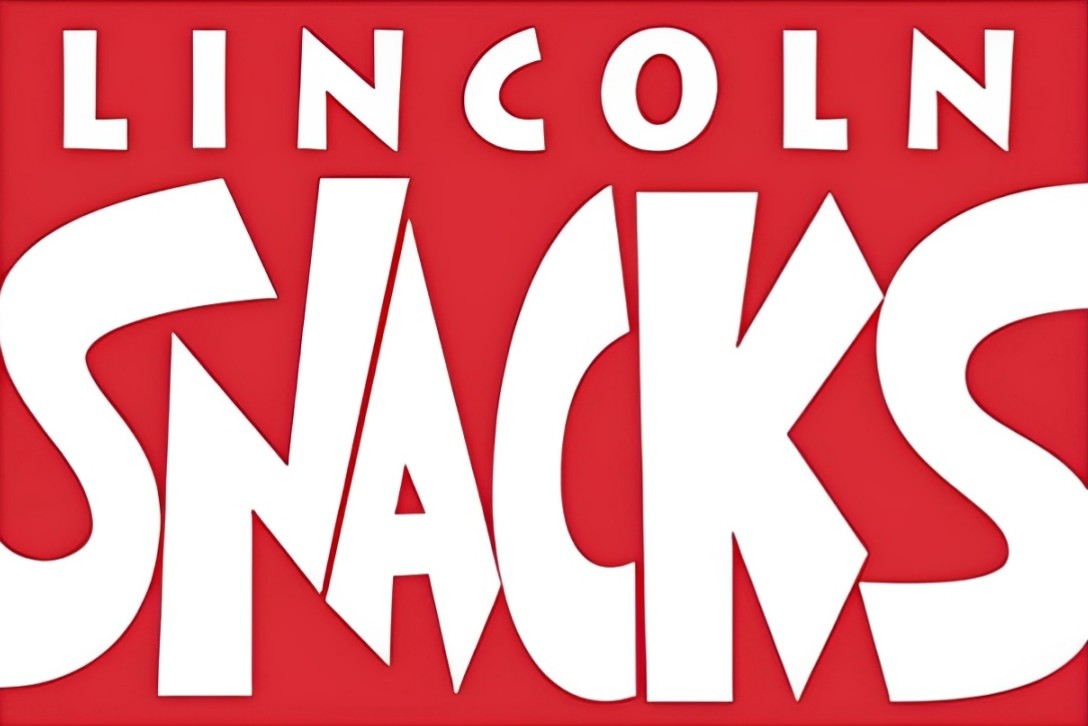
- Industry: Snack food
- Founded: 1968; 58 years ago
- Founder: Sandoz-Wander, Inc.
- Defunct: 2007; 19 years ago
- Headquarters: Lincoln, Nebraska, United States
- Key people: Jeffrey Dunn (president and CEO)
- Products: See products section
- Revenue: US$45 Million (2006)
- Number of employees: 114

The Lincoln Snacks Company (or Lincoln Snacks) was a manufacturer of caramelized popcorn and popcorn/nut mixes. Lincoln Snacks’ products are produced in Lincoln, Nebraska and sold nationally under the Poppycock, Fiddle Faddle and Screaming Yellow Zonkers (discontinued) brand names. Lincoln Snacks became a subsidiary of ConAgra Foods, Inc. on September 7, 2007.

== History ==
=== Wander years ===
The Lincoln Snacks Company has roots in the Wander Company, a Swiss firm founded in Bern in 1865, which manufactured Ovaltine in Villa Park, Illinois. In 1960, Wander bought the rights to Poppycock, a snack consisting of caramelized popcorn and nuts, from Harold Vair, a Detroit candy shop owner. In 1968, Wander merged with Sandoz Nutrition Corporation, a division of Sandoz, to form Sandoz-Wander, Inc. (which is today the pharmaceutical company Novartis). Poppycock production was moved from Villa Park to Lincoln, Nebraska and the Lincoln Snacks Company was created as an operating division of Sandoz-Warner.

=== Ownership changes ===
In February 1992, Sandoz-Wander announced intentions to sell their Lincoln Snacks division due to a decline in net sales. On August 31, 1992, Lincoln Snacks was acquired by Noel Group, Inc., a public buyout firm. Lincoln Snacks’ name was changed to Lincoln Foods Inc. and sales, marketing and administrative headquarters were relocated to Stamford, Connecticut; the manufacturing plant remained in Lincoln, Nebraska. On March 15, 1993, Lincoln Foods acquired Carousel Nut Products, Inc., an Owensboro, Kentucky producer of roasted, raw and mixed nuts. Carousel's operations were merged with the Lincoln plant in 1994. That same year, Lincoln Foods had an initial public offering of 2.15 million shares and began trading under "SNAX" on the NASDAQ stock exchange.

The board of directors of Noel Group approved a "plan of complete liquidation and dissolution" in 1997. In June 1998, however, Brynwood Partners purchased a controlling interest in Lincoln Foods. In 2004, Willis Stein & Partners, a Chicago private-equity firm, purchased Lincoln Foods as well as Jays Foods, Inc., another snack food manufacturer, and created Ubiquity Brands as a parent company. Ubiquity Brands also reverted Lincoln Foods' name to Lincoln Snacks Company. Ubiquity filed for Chapter 11 bankruptcy protection on October 12, 2007.

On September 7, 2007, Lincoln Snacks was purchased by Conagra Foods, Inc. for approximately $50 million in cash. Lincoln Snacks now reports to ConAgra's snack foods division headquartered in Edina, Minnesota.

== Operations ==
=== Manufacturing ===
Lincoln Snacks manufactures and packages all of its products at its Lincoln, Nebraska manufacturing facility. The facility was constructed in 1968 and is a 74,000-square-foot (6,900 m^{2}) one-story building on a 10.75-acre (43,500 m^{2}) site. Approximately 67,000 square feet (6,200 m^{2}) is dedicated to production with the remaining 7,000 square feet (650 m^{2}) being utilized for administration. Lincoln Snacks' 66,500-square-foot (6,180 m^{2}) warehousing facility is located in Lincoln.

=== Marketing and distribution ===
On July 17, 1995, Lincoln Snacks granted Planters Company, a unit of Nabisco, Inc., the exclusive distribution of Fiddle Faddle and Screaming Yellow Zonkers products. On July 11, 1997 Lincoln Snacks entered another agreement with Nabisco, Inc. which granted Lincoln Snacks the right to use Planters’ trademarks in the marketing of Fiddle Faddle. On May 1, 1997, however, Lincoln Snacks resumed marketing and distributing Screaming Yellow Zonkers.

== Products ==
=== Poppycock ===
Poppycock was invented by Harold Vair in the 1950s as a snack to accompany him on road trips. The "original" Poppycock is a "premium priced" product and contains popcorn, almonds and pecans covered in a candy/caramel glaze. Additional Varieties include:

- Cashew Lovers – Almonds and pecans of "original" variety replaced by cashews; introduced in 1999
- Chocolate Lovers – "Original" variety with chocolate drizzling; introduced in 2000
- Pecan delight – Almonds of "original" variety replaced by pralines; introduced in 2001
- Indulgence - Various flavor and nut combinations marketed towards women; introduced in 2007

=== Fiddle Faddle ===
Fiddle Faddle was introduced in 1967 as a "moderately priced" product. Fiddle Faddle consists of popcorn and peanuts covered in either the "original" caramel glaze or a "butter toffee" glaze. The original Fiddle Faddle box was the first snack box to feature a carrying handle.

=== Screaming Yellow Zonkers ===
Screaming Yellow Zonkers is popcorn with a sugary yellow glaze. Screaming Yellow Zonkers was introduced in 1969 as a nut-free alternative to existing caramelized popcorn products. Allan Katz was the creator of the original box and ad campaign. Screaming Yellow Zonkers was featured on the Food Network show Unwrapped in 2002, but has since been discontinued.

== See also ==
ConAgra products:

- Act II Popcorn
- Crunch 'n Munch
- Orville Redenbacher's Popcorn

Similar Products:

- Cracker Jack

== Bibliography ==
- Jackson, Cheryl V. (September 12, 2007). "ConAgra buys Lincoln Snacks". Chicago Sun-Times.
- Piersol, Richard (September 6, 2007). "ConAgra buys Lincoln Snacks, Screaming Yellow legacy". Lincoln Journal Star.
- Segal, David (January 2, 2007). "U.S. Snackocracy on a Quest for the Next Flavor to Savor". The Washington Post.
- St. John, Robert (February 16, 2006). "St. John: Screaming Yellow Zonkers Revisited". The Meridian Star.
