= Andy Capp (disambiguation) =

Andy Capp is a British comic strip character.

Andy Capp may also refer to:

- Andy Capp (TV series), a 1988 sitcom based on the comic strip
- Andy Capp, a 1981 stage musical by Alan Price, based on the comic strip
- Andy Capp's, a brand of snack product sold under the character's name
- Lynford Anderson, Jamaican musician and recording engineer who recorded as Andy Capp
- Andy Capp: The Game, a 1988 platform game for the Commodore 64

== See also ==
- Andy Kapp, German curler
