= Adolph Levis =

American inventor of Slim Jim

Adolph "Al" Levis (1913 – March 20, 2001) was an American businessman and philanthropist known as the inventor of the Slim Jim jerky snack food.

== Early life ==
Levis was born in Philadelphia, Pennsylvania, into a Jewish family. He was a high school dropout, having quit school to earn a living during the Great Depression.

== Career ==
Levis was a violinist, but his musical career was unsuccessful, as was an attempt as a tobacconist. Besides selling spices, he and his brother pickled meat and vegetable products such as pickles, cabbage, and pig's feet in his garage which they sold to Philadelphia taverns. In the 1940s, he and his brother-in-law/partner, Joseph Cherry, hired a meatpacker to develop a handheld dried meat stick. The snack was originally named Penn Rose (presumably after Pennsylvania and Rose, his wife). Although each meat stick was sold individually, a vendor stored the sticks as a bunch and immersed in a large jar of vinegar. Eventually the product was sold individually in a sealed cellophane wrapper. The Cherry-Levis Food Company was sold to General Mills in 1967 for $20 million, and Levis left the company about a year thereafter. The Slim Jim product line was sold to Goodmark Foods in 1982 and then to ConAgra in 1998. Sales in 2015 of the product line were $575 million.

== Personal life ==
Levis and his wife Rose had two daughters, Judy and Barbara. In 1972 Al and Rose Levis moved to Pompano Beach, Florida, then Delray Beach, Florida.

After his professional success, Levis established himself as a philanthropist, assisting over 35 organizations worldwide. Among his primary philanthropic interests were Jewish organizations and charities as well as those involved in the care and treatment of Alzheimer's disease. (His wife Rose suffered from Alzheimer's disease; she died in 1994.) He donated more than $3.5 million to the Jewish Federation of South Palm Beach County; a $2 million gift provided the initial support for what became the Adolph and Rose Levis Jewish Community Center in Boca Raton, Florida, established in 1983. He donated an additional $1 million for the care of adults with Alzheimer's and dementia.

He died at age 89 in hospice in Boca Raton. He was survived by his two daughters, four grandchildren and three great-grandchildren.
