= Fiddle Faddle =

Candy-coated popcorn brand

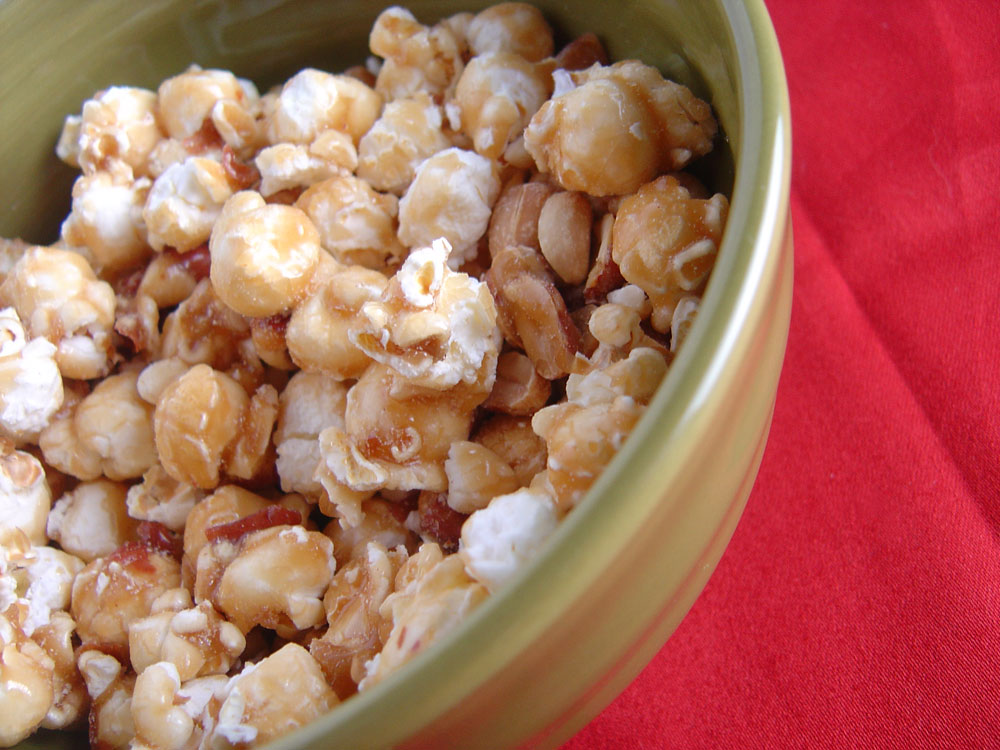
- A bowl of Fiddle Faddle
- Product type: Popcorn
- Current owner: ConAgra
- Country: United States

Fiddle Faddle is caramel popcorn produced by ConAgra Foods. Fiddle Faddle was introduced in 1967. It consists of popped popcorn covered with either caramel or toffee and mixed with peanuts.

== See also ==
- Cracker Jack
- Screaming Yellow Zonkers
- Poppycock
- Crunch 'n Munch
- Lolly Gobble Bliss Bombs
- Lincoln Snacks Company
- List of popcorn brands
