= Cracker Jack =

American snack food brand

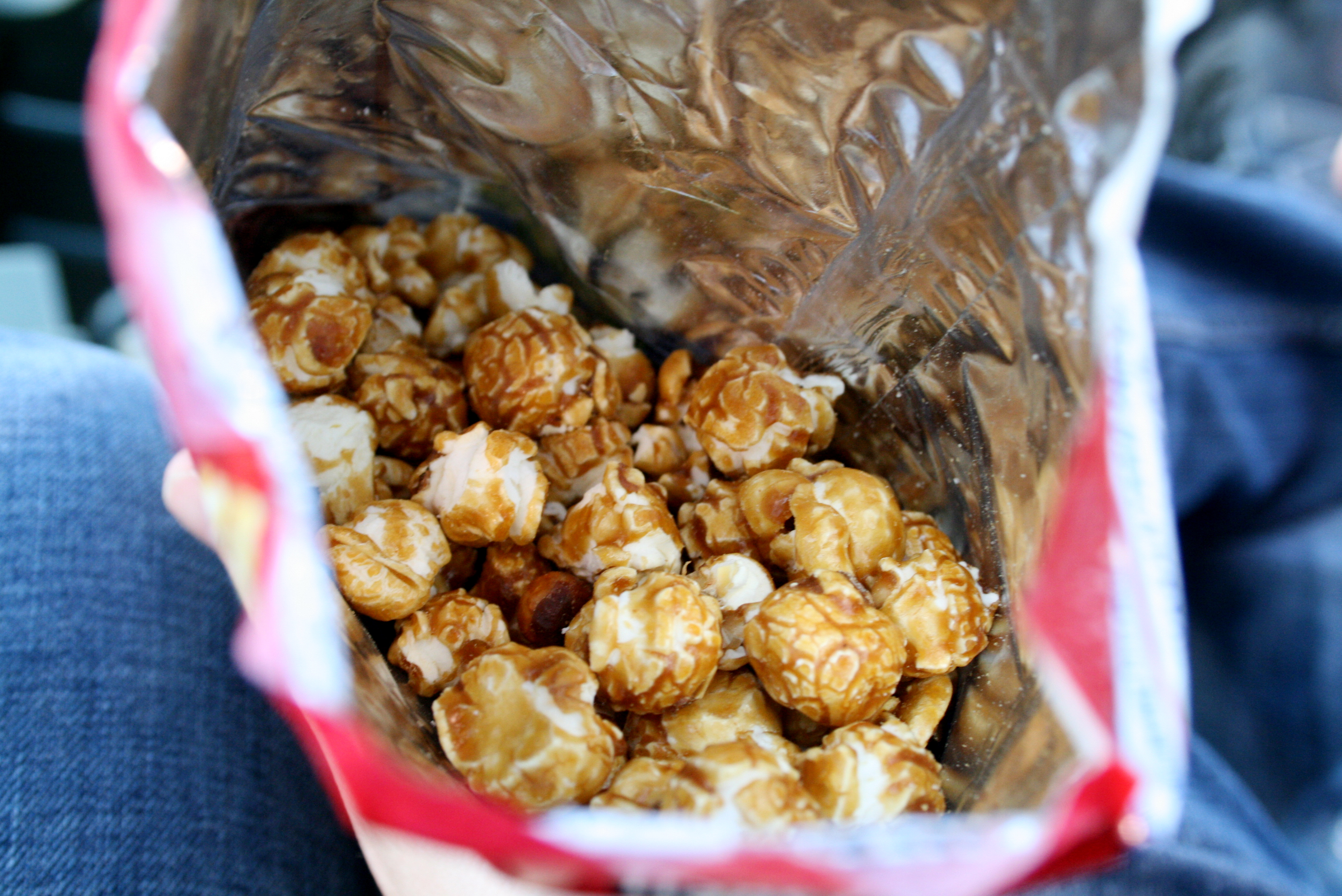
- Product type: Caramel coated popcorn and peanuts
- Current owner: PepsiCo (via Frito-Lay)
- Introduced: 1896; 130 years ago
- Previous owners: The Cracker Jack Company; Borden
- Website: fritolay.com/crackerjack

Cracker Jack is an American brand of snack food that consists of molasses-flavored, caramel-coated popcorn balls and peanuts, well known for being packaged with a prize of trivial value inside. The Cracker Jack name and slogan, "The More You Eat, The More You Want" were registered in 1896. The food historian Andrew F. Smith has called it the first junk food.

Cracker Jack is famous for its connection to baseball. The Cracker Jack brand has been owned and marketed by Frito-Lay since 1997. Frito-Lay announced in 2016 that the toy gift would no longer be provided and had been replaced with a QR code which can be used to download a baseball-themed game.

== Background ==
The origin of sugar-coated popcorn with a mixture of peanuts is unknown, but periodicals document its manufacture and sale in North America as far back as the early 19th century. The Freeport, Illinois Daily Journal newspaper published on January 29, 1857, for example, contains an advertisement by a local merchant selling sugar-coated popcorn.

Recipes for popcorn and peanut mixtures were mentioned in North American literature and expressions of speech:

- Page 4 of the Friday, August 23, 1867, edition of the Evening Star newspaper published in Washington, D. C., contains the notice: The Nantucket Inquirer and Mirror says, "Peanuts and pop-corn were not mixed up with piety when we first knew camp meetings, nor cigar smoking and psalm singing. But the times are changed and we with them."
- An inquiry was published on page 362 of the December 5, 1885 issue of Scientific American, asking how the sugar coating was prepared after the popcorn had popped.
- Page 222 of the 1886 edition of the Pennsylvania Historical Review, Gazetteer, Post-Office, Express and Telegraph Guide lists Goodwin Brothers, 105 North Front Street, Philadelphia, Pennsylvania, as manufacturers of Sugar Coated Popcorn, Prize Balls, Corn Balls, Corn Cakes, etc.

In Chicago, there are two legends of how Cracker Jack originated: The older attributes it to Charles Frederick Gunther (1837–1920), also known as "The Candy Man" and "Cracker-Jacks King"; the other attributes it to Frederick William Rueckheim, a German immigrant known informally as "Fritz", who sold popcorn at 113 Fourth Avenue (now known as Federal Street), in Chicago beginning in 1871. The Rueckheim popcorn was made by hand, using steam equipment. In 1873, Fritz bought out his partner William Brinkmeyer and brought his brother Louis from Germany to join in his venture, forming the company F. W. Rueckheim & Bro.

The Rueckheim brothers produced a new recipe, including popcorn, peanuts, and molasses, and first presented it to the public at the World's Columbian Exposition (Chicago's first World's Fair) in 1893. The molasses of this early version was too sticky.

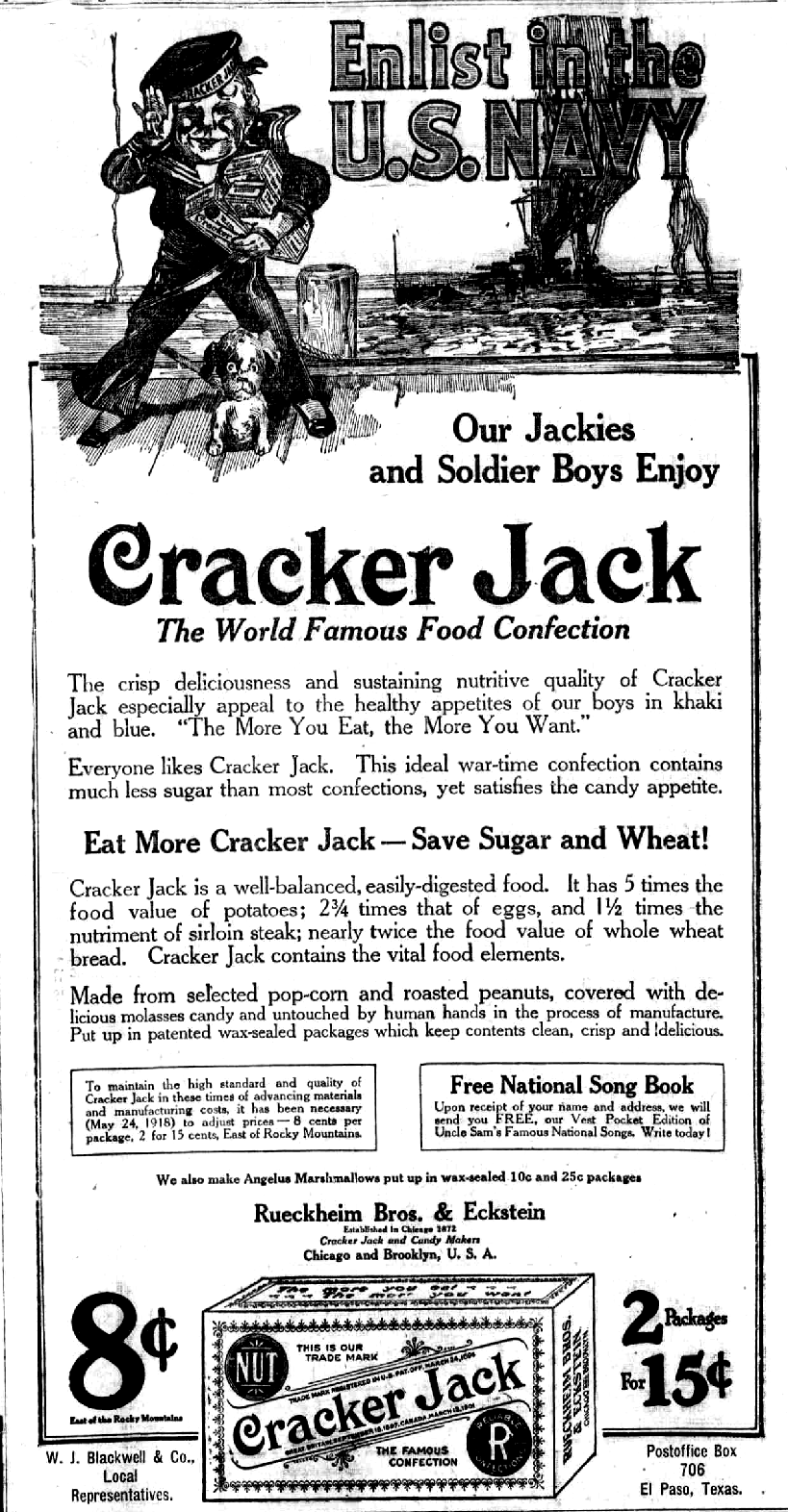
1918 Cracker Jack ad, asking readers to enlist in the Navy. Eating Cracker Jack would save valuable sugar and wheat for the war effort.

In 1896, Louis discovered a method to separate the kernels of molasses-coated popcorn during the manufacturing process. As each batch was mixed in a cement-mixer-like drum, a small quantity of oil was added — a closely guarded trade secret. Before this change, the mixture had been difficult to handle, as it stuck together in chunks.

== Naming and packaging ==
In 1896, the first lot of Cracker Jack was produced, the same year the product's name and tagline "The More You Eat, the More You Want" were registered. It was named as if someone tasted it and remarked: "That's a crackerjack!" (Crackerjack is a colloquialism meaning "of excellent quality").

In 1899, Henry Gottlieb Eckstein developed the "waxed sealed package" for freshness, which was then known as the "Eckstein Triple Proof Package," a dust-, germ-, and moisture-proof paper package.

In 1902, the company was reorganized as Rueckheim Bros. & Eckstein. In 1907, the release of the song, "Take Me Out to the Ball Game," written by the lyricist Jack Norworth and composer Albert Von Tilzer, gave Cracker Jack free publicity, with its line: "Buy me some peanuts and Cracker Jack!"

In 1922, the name of the Chicago company was changed to The Cracker Jack Company.

== Mascots ==
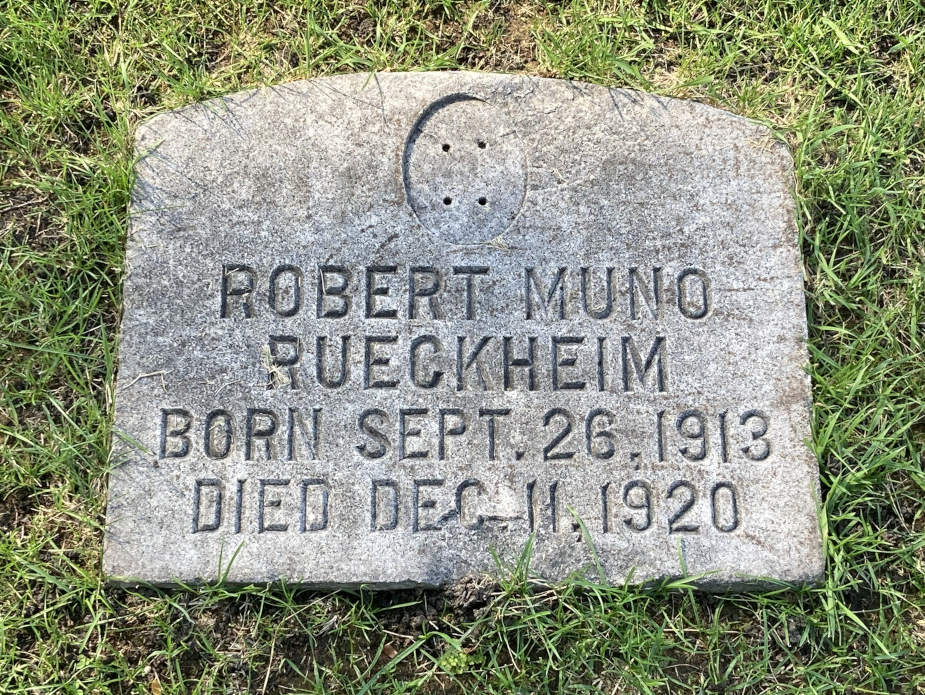
Robert Rueckheim's grave at St. Henry Catholic Cemetery. As of October 2022, the inset image of Sailor Jack is missing.

Cracker Jack's mascots Sailor Jack and his dog Bingo, drawn by Andrew Loomis, were introduced as early as 1916 and registered as a trademark in 1919. Sailor Jack was modeled after Frederick’s grandson Robert Rueckheim. He was the son of Edward, the eldest of the Rueckheim brothers. Robert died of pneumonia shortly after his image appeared at the age of 7. The sailor boy image acquired such meaning for the founder of Cracker Jack that he had it carved on his tombstone at St. Henry Catholic Cemetery in Chicago; the image, an inset in the stone, is missing.

== Ownership ==
The Cracker Jack Company was purchased by Borden in 1964 after a bidding war with Frito-Lay and was manufactured for years in Northbrook, Illinois. Borden sold the brand to Frito-Lay parent PepsiCo in 1997, and Cracker Jack was quickly incorporated into the Frito-Lay portfolio. Frito-Lay transferred production of Cracker Jack from Northbrook to Wyandot Snacks in Marion, Ohio soon after that.

In 2013, Frito-Lay announced that Cracker Jack would undergo a slight reformulation, adding more peanuts and updating the prizes to make them more relevant to the times.

== Cracker Jack'D ==
On April 30, 2013, Frito-Lay expanded the Cracker Jack product line to include other salty snacks in the spirit of the original Cracker Jack. Called Cracker Jack'D, it is distinct from the original Cracker Jack by using black packaging instead of the traditional red and white and showing a close-up version of Sailor Jack & Bingo. In addition, unlike the original Cracker Jack, Cracker Jack'D has not featured prizes in its packages. One of the products available under the Cracker Jack'D line, the Power Bites, gained some criticism before its official launch due to concern over caffeine being added to more foods, and potential harm to children or pregnant women.

== Baseball connection ==
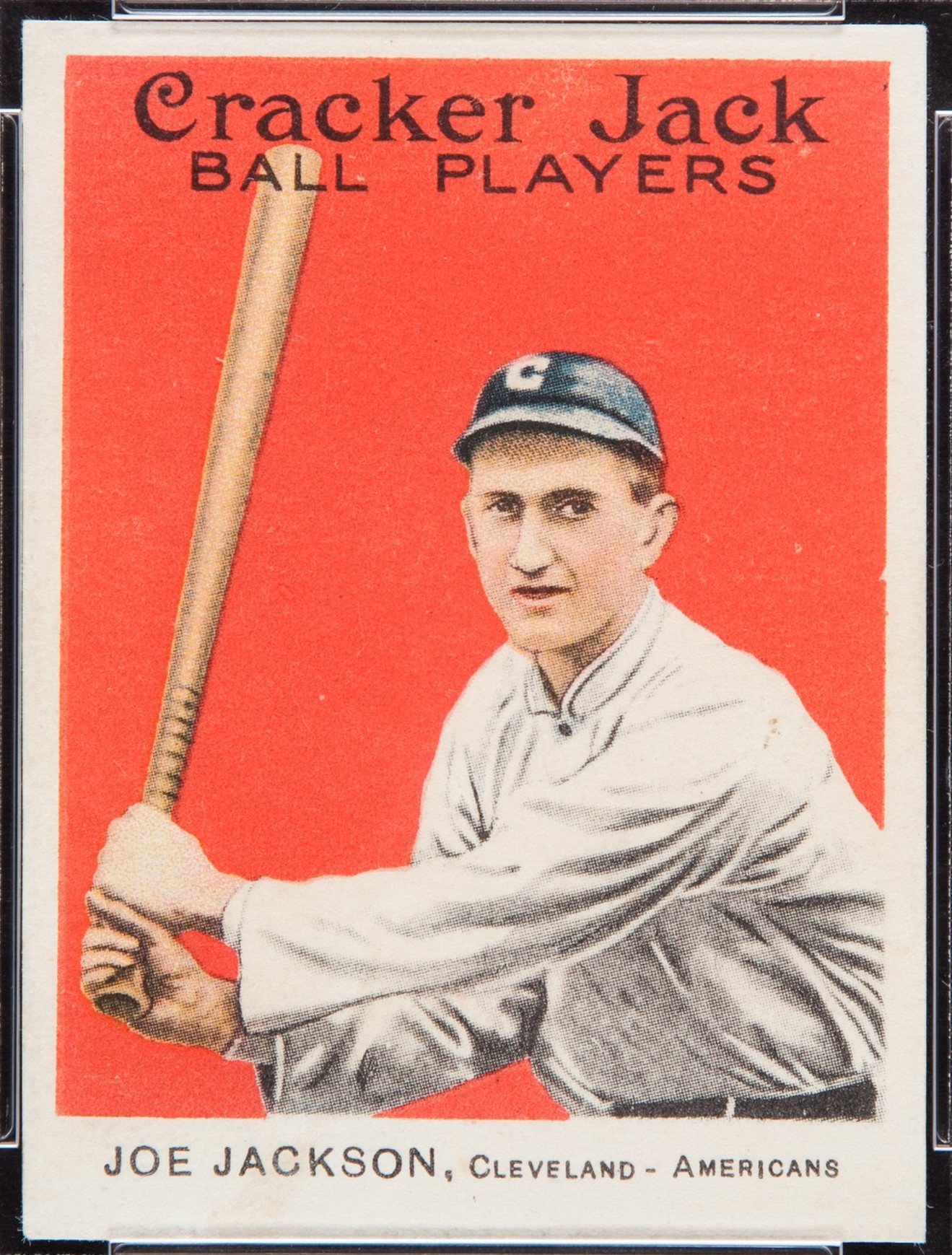
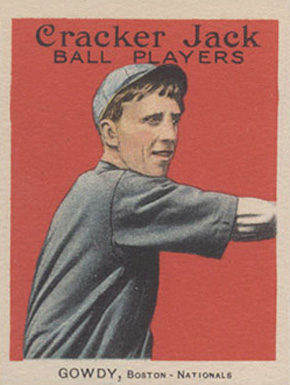
Shoeless Joe Jackson (left) and Hank Gowdy displayed on baseball cards, issued by Cracker Jack in 1915

Cracker Jack is known for being commonly sold at baseball games and is mentioned in the American standard "Take Me Out to the Ball Game."

Each July from 1982 to 1985, Cracker Jack sponsored an Old-Timers Classic game featuring former MLB players, held at RFK Stadium in Washington, D.C.

On June 16, 1993, the 100th anniversary of Cracker Jack was celebrated at Wrigley Field during the game between the Cubs and the expansion Florida Marlins. Before the game, Sailor Jack, the company's mascot, threw out the ceremonial first pitch.

In 2004, the New York Yankees baseball team replaced Cracker Jack with the milder, sweet butter toffee-flavored Crunch 'n Munch at home games. After public outcry, the club switched back to Cracker Jack.

== Advertising ==
The Cracker Jack Company began advertising on television in 1955. Cracker Jack sponsored CBS Television's On Your Account, which was televised on 130 stations nationally.

Actor Jack Gilford appeared in many television commercials for Cracker Jack from 1960 until 1972, and was most recognized as the "rubber-faced guy on the Cracker Jack commercials" for 12 years.

Puppeteer Shari Lewis and her puppet Lamb Chop appeared in Cracker Jack commercials in 1961.

A new television ad for Cracker Jack ran during Super Bowl XXXIII on January 31, 1999. It was the first television advertising for the Cracker Jack brand in 15 years. It introduced the company's new bag packaging, the first time Cracker Jack was made available in something other than the classic Cracker Jack box.

== Toys and prizes ==
Cracker Jack originally included a small "mystery" novelty item referred to as a "Toy Surprise" in each box. The tagline for Cracker Jack was originally "Candy-coated popcorn, peanuts and a prize" but has since become "Caramel-coated popcorn & peanuts" under Frito-Lay.

Prizes were included in every box of Cracker Jack beginning in 1912. One of the first prizes was in 1914 when the company produced the first of two Cracker Jack baseball card issues, which featured players from both major leagues as well as players from the short-lived Federal League. Early "toy surprises" included rings, plastic figurines, booklets, stickers, temporary tattoos, and decoder rings. Books have been written cataloging the prizes, and a substantial collector's market exists.

Until 1937, Cracker Jack toy prizes were made in Japan. They were designed by Carey Cloud from 1938. Many metal toys were also made by TootsieToy, who also made Monopoly game markers. During World War II, the prizes were made of paper.

In the 1961 movie Breakfast at Tiffany's, the lead couple goes to Tiffany & Co. where they have a ring from a box of Cracker Jack engraved.

The prizes attained pop-culture status with the phrase "came in a Cracker Jack box" or metaphorical comparisons to a "Cracker Jack prize," particularly when applied sarcastically to engagement and wedding rings of dubious investment value. The Jim Steinman song "Two Out of Three Ain't Bad" (best known as a 1978 recording by Meat Loaf) includes the lyric "there ain't no Coupe de Ville hiding at the bottom of a Cracker Jack box."

Under Frito-Lay, toy and trinket prizes were replaced with paper prizes displaying riddles and jokes, then temporary tattoos. In 2013, some prizes became codes for people to play "nostalgic" games on the Cracker Jack app through Google Play for Android-powered devices. The announcement was made in 2016 that these gameplays would replace tangible prizes.

== See also ==
- Caramel corn
- Crunch 'n Munch
- Fiddle Faddle
- List of popcorn brands
- Lolly Gobble Bliss Bombs
- Poppycock
- Prizes
- Screaming Yellow Zonkers
- Take Me Out To The Ballgame
