= Poppycock =

American candied popcorn brand

Poppycock is a brand of candied popcorn. Though it is marketed in a variety of combinations, the original mixture consists of clusters of popcorn, almonds, and pecans covered in a candy glaze. Other specialty combinations include mixtures with emphasis on cashews, chocolate, and pecans.

== History ==
The history of Poppycock is uncertain. According to Lincoln Snacks, Poppycock was invented by Howard Vair in the 1950s as a snack to accompany him on road trips. In 1960, Wander, a Swiss company, bought the rights to Poppycock and moved production to their Villa Park, Illinois, facility.

However, in 1969, a snack matching the description of Poppycock was patented by Arnold Rebane, who worked for the Wander Company.

In 1991, Lincoln Snacks Company acquired Poppycock and on September 7, 2007, Lincoln Snacks was purchased by ConAgra Foods. The product is also now cross-branded with the Orville Redenbacher's brand.

== See also ==
- Cracker Jack
- Fiddle Faddle
- Crunch 'n Munch
- List of popcorn brands
- Lolly Gobble Bliss Bombs
