= Screaming Yellow Zonkers =

Defunct brand of popcorn snack food

Screaming Yellow Zonkers box

Screaming Yellow Zonkers was a popcorn snack food, produced and marketed by Lincoln Snacks in the United States from 1969 to 2007, with subsequent limited editions. Zonkers were noted for the bold graphics and funny text of their packaging.

== Development ==
In 1968, Lincoln Snacks developed a nut-free, kosher sugar-glazed popcorn with a strong yellow color—as a variant of their other popcorn products, Fiddle Faddle and Poppycock.

When Lincoln executives invited major ad agencies in Chicago to pitch ideas for a name and marketing concept, a small agency, Hurvis, Binzer & Churchill won the account, naming the product "Screaming Yellow Zonkers" and presenting it in a black box with bold graphics, detailed illustrations and funny text.

The snack was introduced, first in the Midwest, on August 15, 1969.

== Discontinuation ==
Zonkers were discontinued when Conagra acquired Lincoln Foods in 2007. Conagra reintroduced Zonkers on a limited-edition basis for Walgreens as of 2012.

== See also ==
- Crunch 'n Munch
- Fiddle Faddle
- List of brand name snack foods
- List of popcorn brands
- Lolly Gobble Bliss Bombs
- Poppycock
- Marge Simpson in: Screaming Yellow Honkers
