= Reg Smythe =

British cartoonist, creator of Andy Capp

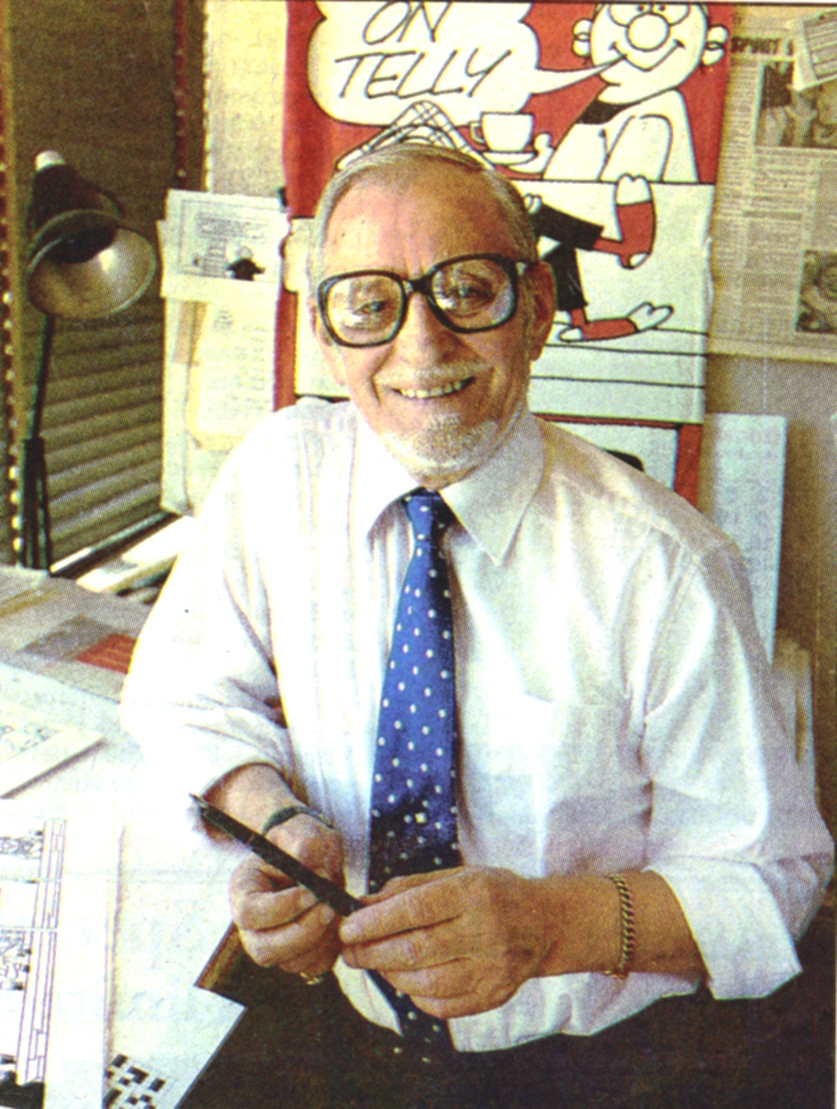
- Reg Smythe
- Born: Reginald Smyth; 10 July 1917 Hartlepool, County Durham, England
- Died: 13 June 1998 (aged 80) Hartlepool, County Durham, England
- Areas: Cartoonist, Writer, Artist
- Notable works: Andy Capp (1957–98)

Reginald Smyth (10 July 1917 – 13 June 1998) was a British cartoonist who created the popular, long-running Andy Capp comic strip.

== Early life and military service ==
He was born in Hartlepool, County Durham, England, the son of Richard Oliver Smyth, a shipyard worker, and his wife, Florence, née Pearce, the oldest of five children (his siblings being Lily, Harry, Laura and Jimmy). With his father chronically unemployed, he grew up in poverty, and often referred to himself as a "canvas shoes kid." He attended Galley's Field School on the Hartlepool Headland but left at fourteen to take a job as a butcher's errand boy. In 1936, after a period of unemployment, he joined the Royal Northumberland Fusiliers and was posted to Egypt. His father died during his service.

He served during the Second World War in the North African Campaign, and was assigned to a tank demolition team. Promoted to sergeant, he was demoted to corporal for a minor disciplinary offence, and was ultimately medically discharged for a stomach ulcer after a stint in an Edinburgh hospital in 1945. He was awarded the 1939-1945 Star, the Africa Star, the Defence Medal and the War Medal 1939-1945, for his service. During this time he developed his talent for drawing, designing posters for amateur dramatic productions and selling cartoons to Cairo magazines.

== Early cartooning career ==
After the army, he took a job as a telephone clerk for the General Post Office in London. He married Vera Toyne in 1949; they had no children. He continued to design theatrical posters in his spare time, and was advised to become a professional cartoonist. He sent thirty cartoons to an agent, who sold two to Everybody's Weekly for more than his weekly wage at the GPO. While retaining his day job, he was soon drawing sixty cartoons a week, using "Reg Smythe" as his professional name. The cartoonist Leslie Harding (alias "Styx") worked for the same agent, and became his mentor.

He contributed to publications like the Fishtrader's Gazette and the Draper's Record, and drew sketches of council meetings for local newspapers. In 1950 he went freelance, and drew cartoon features like "Smythe's Speedway World" for Speedway World and "Skid Sprocket" for Monthly Speedway World, as well as cartoons for the London Evening Standard, Reveille, Punch, and the Daily Mirror, where he contributed to the paper's "Laughter Column".

== The Daily Mirror and Andy Capp ==
In 1954 the Daily Mirror's art editor, Philip Zec, gave Smythe a regular daily cartoon, "Laughter at Work". Then, in 1957, he was asked by Mirror editor Hugh Cudlipp to create a cartoon character for the paper's Manchester edition. He thought up Andy Capp, a stereotypically lazy, selfish working-class northerner in a flat cap, and his long-suffering wife Flo (named after Smythe's mother), during the seven-hour drive from his mother's house in Hartlepool to London.

Capp is thought to have been based on Smythe's father, although Smythe never confirmed that, perhaps because in one early cartoon he depicted Andy as a wife-beater, something he later regretted. Smythe's mother recognised her late husband in Andy, although she insisted Richard was not a violent man. Capp's headgear was inspired by a fellow spectator at a football match Smythe had attended when young, who took off his cap when it started to rain, because he didn't want to wear a wet cap at home that evening.

Originally commissioned for the Mirror's northern edition, Andy Capp was soon appearing in all editions nationwide. The first collection of Andy Capp cartoons was published in 1958. The strip became internationally popular, appearing in at least 700 newspapers in 34 countries, including the Chicago Sun-Times in the USA. While in America the title became "Andy Capp - Our English Cousin," the punning resisted translation: in Sweden it was titled "Tuffa Viktor", in Germany "Willi Wacker", in Austria "Charlie Kappl", in Italy "Carlo e Alice" (instead of Andy and Flo when published by La Settimana Enigmistica from 1960 to 2008. Later it was renamed "Andy Capp" when published in "Eureka" magazine from 1967 to 1984), in The Netherlands "Jan met de Pet", in France "André Chapeau", in Turkey "Güngörmez Dursun", in Iceland "Siggi sixpensari" and in Denmark "Kasket Karl". Later he was called "Linke Loetje" when published in the "Volkskrant" newspaper.

In 1982 an Andy Capp musical was produced, starring Tom Courtenay with music by Alan Price, first in Manchester, later in London, and then to great success in Finland. A TV series aired on ITV in 1988, written by Keith Waterhouse and starring James Bolam, but ratings were poor and a second series was cancelled.

== Later life ==
Smythe returned to his hometown of Hartlepool in 1976, living a reclusive life on a large estate. His first wife, Vera, died in 1997, and in 1998 he married Jean Marie Glynn Barry, but later the same year he died of lung cancer. He had left a stockpile of more than a year's worth of Andy Capp cartoons. His contract with the Daily Mirror had required him to train a replacement, but he had not done so. After the stockpile had been published, the strip was continued by writer Roger Kettle and artist Roger Mahoney.

== Awards and recognition ==
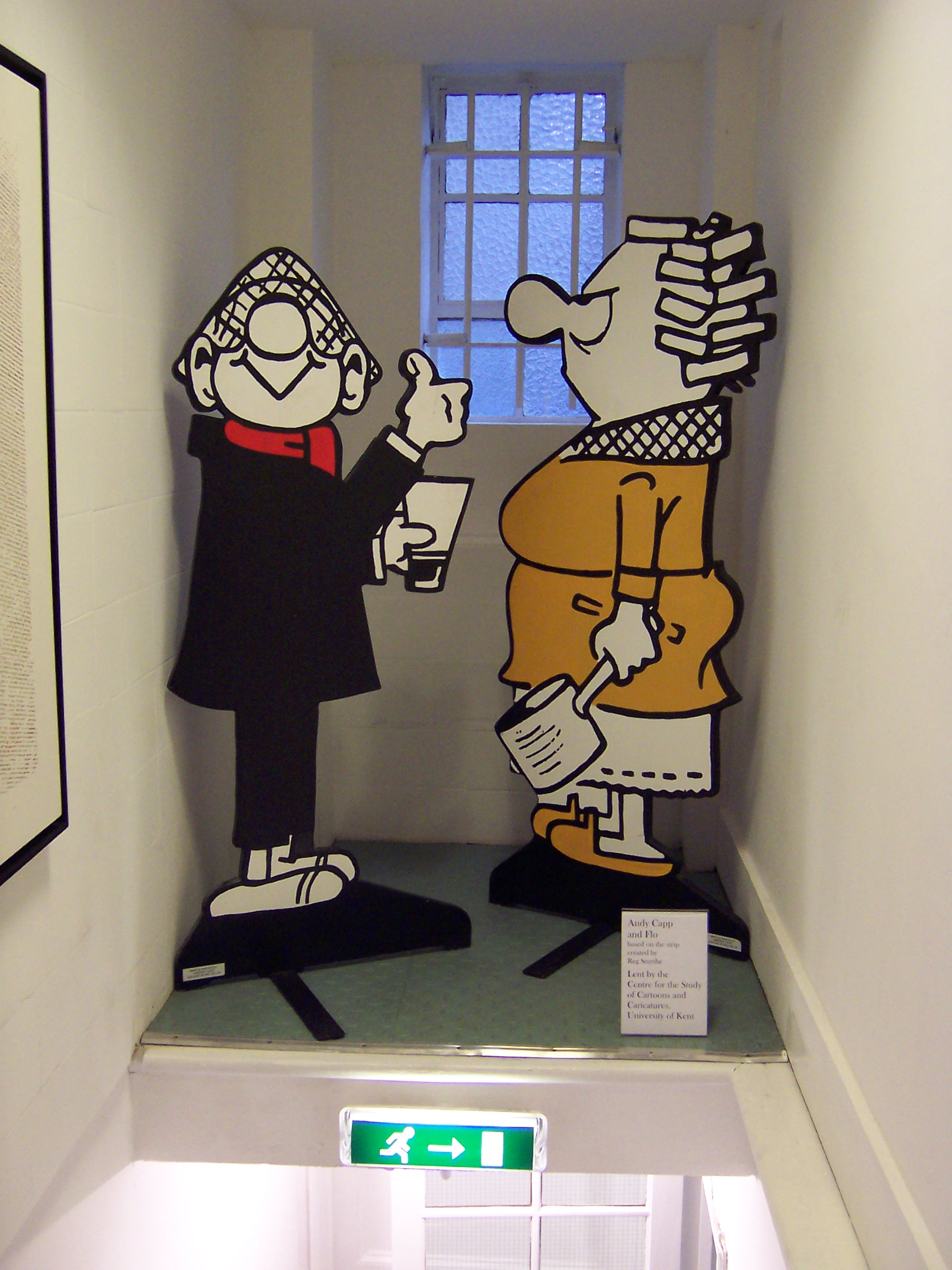
Andy and Flo at the Cartoon Museum

Smythe was honored with numerous awards, including Best British Cartoon Strip every year from 1961 to 1965 and major awards in Italy (1969, 1973, 1978). In the US he received the National Cartoonists Society's Best Strip award in 1974.

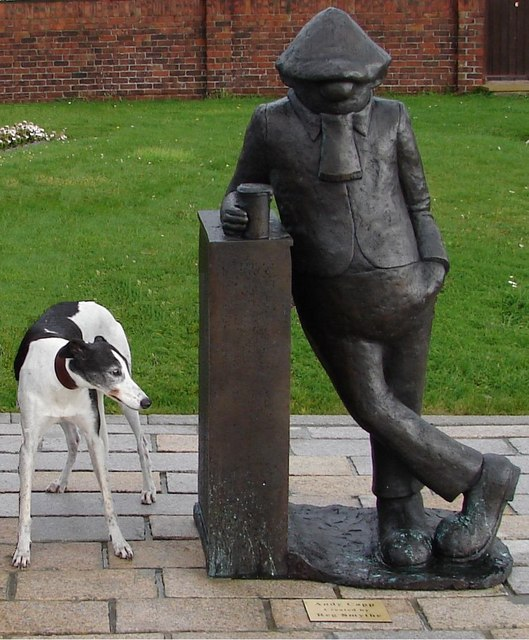
Statue in Hartlepool, England

In 2007, after years of local speculation and fundraising, a bronze statue commemorating Andy Capp was erected near the Harbour of Refuge pub in Smythe’s home town of Hartlepool. Measuring five feet eight inches, the statue cost £20,000 and was designed by Shrewsbury sculptor Jane Robbins.
