= Angie's Kettle Corn =

Brand of popcorn

Angie's BoomChickaPop PopCorn is a brand of kettle corn produced for Angie's Artisan Treats, Minnesota.

== History ==
The producers, Angie and Dan Bastian of North Mankato, Minnesota, originally distributed their product in 2002 outside the Metrodome during Minnesota Vikings home games. As of November 2011, the business was reportedly producing 80,000 bags each day and had a full-time staff of 130.

The snack was named a Health Magazine Editor's Pick and Elizabeth's Pick by Minnesota Monthly.

The company was acquired by Conagra Foods in 2017.

== See also ==
- List of popcorn brands
