= Andy Capp =

British comic strip

- Andy and Flo
- Author: Reg Smythe
- Website: mirror.co.uk/andy-capp; creators.com/andy-capp
- Current status/schedule: Running
- Launch date: 5 August 1957
- Syndicate(s): Publishers-Hall Syndicate (1957–1975); Field Newspaper Syndicate / News America Syndicate (1975–c. 1987); Creators Syndicate (c. 1987–present)
- Publisher: Daily Mirror
- Genre: Humour slapstick

Andy Capp is a British comic strip created by cartoonist Reg Smythe, seen in the Daily Mirror and the Sunday Mirror newspapers since 5 August 1957. Originally a single-panel cartoon, it was later expanded to four panels.

The strip is syndicated internationally by Creators Syndicate. The character is also licensed as the mascot for a line of snack foods (Andy Capp's fries).

== Characters and story ==
A representative Andy Capp strip illustrating the comic's distinctive blend of working-class humour and ironic observations about everyday life. Andy's disruptive behavior culminates in Jackie the bar owner humorously reflecting on the contradiction between a business's best customer and its greatest nuisance.

- Andy (short for Andrew) Capp
- Florrie "Flo" Capp (named after Florence Nightingale in the storyline, but named for Smythe's mother in reality)
- Chalkie White
- Ruby "Rube" White
- Percy Ritson, the rent collector
- Jackie the barman/owner of the Rose and Crown Pub
- The Vicar
- Flo's Mum (never seen)
- Minor recurring characters include various constables, judges, lawyers, doctors, barmaids, barmen, referees, footballers, pub locals, door-to-door salesmen, debt collectors, job centre employees, dinner guests, neighborhood ladies who disparage Andy, pretty young women at the pub who are typically repulsed by the older Andy, old friends to whom Andy owes money, the mostly-unseen friend Nosher Thompson, and Guitar Bob who entertains at the pub to a disdaining small crowd.

Andy is a working-class figure who never actually works, living in Hartlepool, a harbour town in County Durham, in North East England. The title of the strip is a pun on the word "handicap"; and the surname Capp signifies how Andy's cap always covered his eyes along with, metaphorically, his vision in life. Handicap racing and handicapping, in sport and games, is part of betting, a favourite activity of Andy Capp.

Andy's hobbies and activities include pigeon racing, darts, snooker (his cue's name is Delilah), playing football (which always involves fights with the other players, and frequently ends with Andy being sent off), occasional cricket and rugby, betting on horses (and usually losing badly), getting drunk in the local pub (often falling into the canal and being fished out by a constable, and usually arriving home late as a result), ending up in the local jail, fishing (and not catching anything bigger than a goldfish), mooching money from everyone including Flo usually for beer or gambling, cadging (mooching) for beer at the bar or running up a tab that goes unpaid, unsuccessfully flirting with barmaids (also yelling at them when he is not served), attempting to pick up bargirls (and usually being rejected, although sometimes he is actually successful), loafing and napping on the sofa, playing poker (and usually cheating with hidden cards, although plainly seen by the readers), and fighting with his long-suffering wife Florrie (also known as "Flo"), as well as being served burnt food by her.

Andy's iconic checked flat cap is always pulled down over his eyes, even when he is napping or bathing. He is often unshaven, frequently intoxicated (indicated by a prominent red nose and dishevelled clothing), lazy, freeloading, belligerent, and confrontational, but just as frequently lovable (he always refers to Flo as "pet", and will instantly "bop" anyone who dares to be rude to her). Until the 1980s, he was often seen with a cigarette dangling from his lip. When Andy gave up smoking in 1983, some readers blamed political correctness. However, Fergus McKenna, head of syndication at Trinity Mirror which publishes the Daily Mirror, denied that the newspaper had put pressure on Smythe to change Andy's habits, saying: "The truth is that Reg himself gave up smoking and he said there was no way Andy was going to carry on enjoying cigarettes when Reg couldn't". Andy and Florrie now attend marriage counselling.

Andy and Florrie are always on the verge of poverty. Although Flo works regularly as a charwoman, Andy is unemployed and lacks motivation. Rent on their terraced house and its contents is constantly in arrears, and the rent collector, Percy Ritson, despairs of ever being paid. He, as well as several others, always nag Andy to get himself a job, which is usually met with him clobbering them. Twice Andy actually won a legal bet on racing horses at odds of 10 to 1; in one comic as usual Andy goes to the Pub to celebrate, only for Jackie the barman to present Andy with a boxful of unpaid IOUs; another time Andy went to celebrate his winnings until he was confronted with his bar tab and £90 total he owes two of his friends. Another time, Andy saw Dennis Donald go to the Rose and Crown Pub; Andy decides to go to the Pig and Whistle Pub because he can't stand listening to Donald talk of stamp collecting - in fact Donald has come into a big inheritance and decides to celebrate by buying everyone a round all evening. Once when Andy met a friend called Charlie going into a pub, Andy tried to trick him into buying a free pint because he has a "raging thirst." His friend gives Andy some bottled water. Once when an ethnic Irish pub opened on St. Patrick's day and all drinks that day were free to ethnic Irishmen, Andy introduces himself as Andy O'Capp and his friend as Chalkie O'Wite.

Percy is also always confronting Andy on the way he treats Flo. It's obvious Percy has a crush on Flo and believes he would treat her far better than Andy does. This has led the two men to fight.

Their furniture has been repossessed on several occasions. Somehow they always manage to retrieve it, and Andy is always able to afford beer and gambling money, usually by borrowing from Florrie.

Almost all the characters occasionally "break the fourth wall" by delivering asides directly to the reader, or even as a very terse 'thought bubble', usually referring to Andy's low character, but more regularly by a character simply cutting their eyes to the reader in the final panel whenever something is said or done by Andy that the character finds unbelievable. The 24 October 1972 strip revealed that Andy once worked as a sign painter, but had not worked at that trade (or any other) for many years. Should anyone suggest he get a job, his response is often very terse and along the lines of 'Don't be so ridiculous!' and sometimes leads to fisticuffs.

He occasionally visits the Job Centre (Labour Exchange) and is sometimes shown finding excuses why he cannot take a job that seems suitable for him, preferring instead to collect his "dole money" (government unemployment assistance). {When asked how long Andy been on the dole, the Vicar replied Andy first got his money in farthings!) After a running gag of fifty years of Andy being unemployed, on November 29, 2016 while at the Labour Exchange, Andy is overjoyed when he finally found and signed up for his dream occupation-Sample beer taster of ales at local brewery. Unfortunately for Andy, the Brewery makes non-alcoholic ales! On more than one occasion, it is mentioned that Andy had been in the army (with the Royal Northumberland Fusiliers, Reg Smythe's regiment) and was a World War II veteran of the North African campaign. (He held a record of dismantling a bren machine gun in three minutes and set another record for putting it back together in four hours!) According to Don Markstein,

Early on, the Andy Capp strip was accused of perpetuating stereotypes about Britain's Northerners, who are seen in other parts of England as chronically unemployed, dividing their time between the living room couch and the neighbourhood pub, with a few hours set aside for fistfights at football games ... But Smythe, himself a native of that region, had nothing but affection for his good-for-nothing protagonist, which showed in his work. Since the very beginning, Andy has been immensely popular among the people he supposedly skewers.

The strip takes place almost exclusively in one of three locations: the pub, the street, or inside the Capps' residence at 37 Durham Street (generally with Andy on the couch and Florrie yelling from the next room). Less-frequently visited places include the racetrack (although Andy frequently bets by listening to the radio, thus saving him the trip), the marriage counsellor, and the football pitch (where Andy is either fighting, quarrelling, being sent off, or carried off on a stretcher).

Andy's and Flo's best friends are their neighbours Chalkie and Rube White. Chalkie is a hard-drinking working-class type like Andy, who can often be seen sharing a pint with him at the corner pub, but Chalkie seems mellower than Andy, and more tolerant of his wife. Rube is Flo's confidante, and the two often trade gossip over the clothesline about their husbands' latest escapades. The local vicar is also often seen. Andy despairs of his holier-than-thou attitude, as he is constantly criticising Andy for his many bad habits and vice-ridden lifestyle. He often lets his opinion be known to Flo, who agrees with his low assessment of Andy's character.

At times, Flo will forcibly remove Andy from the pub when she feels he has been there for far too long (even at times, missing his tea meal). When he comes home, especially in the earlier strips, Flo often confronted him about his doings, sometimes striking him with either her fist or anything she could grab, for example a rolling pin, cricket bat or something similar with the intent to clobber him. Flo tells her friend Rube that Andy was a victim of identity theft until those who stole it realized who Andy was and tried to give it back! Another time Flo has Andy try to stop some cheeky persons from being rude to her mother—before her mother beats them up! Her father is never seen: once when Flo tells a drunk Andy what her father thought of him, she then knocks Andy down with a single punch, since her father was a man of few words.

However, Flo is not without her own vices. She (along with Rube) will go to bingo with the same frequency as Andy goes to the pub (and loses more often than not). Whenever this happened (mainly in the earlier strips), the roles are then reversed, with Andy usually confronting Flo for being late from going to bingo and sometimes striking her with either his fist or chasing her out the door with a push broom or a chair with the intent to clobber her with said object. She has also lost cleaning jobs due to her love of bingo.

Flo is also not a very good cook, regularly burning the meals with her lack of cooking skills. This often sends Andy into a rage and off to the nearest café for a meal.

Flo was Smythe's favourite character and shares the name with his real-life mother. "She should have been included in the title, but I wanted a single name and the pun on "handicap" was irresistible."

Flo's mother, an unseen character whose dialogue appears from out of frame, often chimes into the conversation, mostly with sarcastic criticism of her son-in-law (her feet and legs appear in one panel where she has passed out after Andy offers her too much to drink). Flo's "mam", whom Andy addresses only as "Missus", is often the subject of Andy's pointed barbs about her weight and less-than-sunny disposition, but she has been known to give as good as she gets. Andy's mother was similarly mentioned and also delivered dialogue from offstage, but her "appearances" were cut back significantly as the years passed. Andy's father has also been mentioned. Flo has an older sister named Polly who is seen once, and a never-seen brother. Andy had a pet whippet, Nancy, and has always kept pigeons.

Two of the constables who observe Andy's drunken behaviour are named Alan and Trevor.

== Continuation ==
Reg Smythe died on 13 June 1998, but the original strip has continued. For some time, the writer and artist were uncredited, but in November 2004 the strip began to carry a credit for Roger Mahoney (artist) and Roger Kettle (writer). Circa 2011, Kettle discontinued his work on the strip and was replaced by Lawrence Goldsmith and Sean Garnett, while Mahoney continued to draw. The appearance of the characters did not change perceptibly.

Towards the end of 2020, Mahoney's credit began to be left off strips with a subtle but noticeably different style in both lettering and art. This led to at least one industry source inferring that Mahoney, at 87 years of age, and after 65 years of cartooning, had retired. Mahoney died at 89, on 29 November 2022.

Strips into 2021 and beyond only show credits for writers Goldsmith and Garnett and continue the distinct style.

=== Animated appearances ===
In May 2012, Andy Capp (as well as Flo, Chalkie White, the Vicar, and Jackie the Barman) appeared as an animated series for the first time in promotional material for The Trinity Mirror-owned MirrorBingo.com website. The animation was created by Teesside-born Chris Hunneysett, who drew from his own background to place Andy Capp in Middlesbrough. Andy Capp had previously appeared in animated form in television adverts for the Post Office (1986) and Kit Kat (1993).

== Awards ==
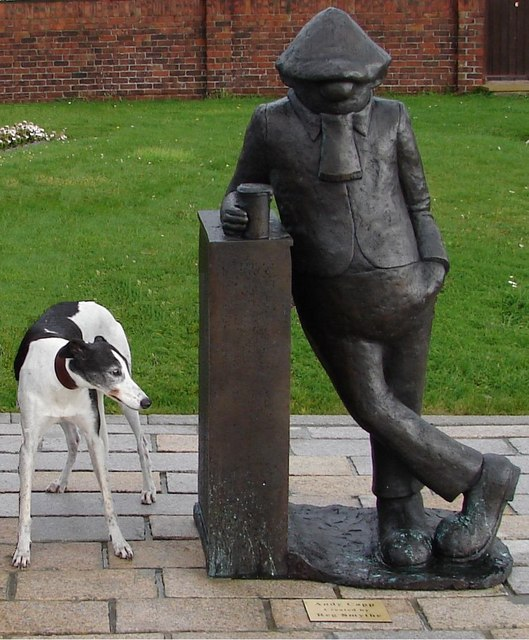
Statue in Hartlepool, England

Smythe received the National Cartoonists Society's Humor Comic Strip Award for the strip in 1974.

A statue of Andy Capp was erected in Hartlepool on 28 June 2007. It was sculpted by Jane Robbins.

== Book collections and reprints ==
=== United Kingdom ===
(All titles by Reg Smythe. Published by Daily Mirror Books/Mirror Group Publishers unless otherwise noted)

- The Andy Capp Book (No. 1) (1958)
- Andy Capp Spring Tonic (No. 2) (1959)
- Life with Andy Capp (No. 3) (1959)
- The Andy Capp Spring Collection (No. 4) (1960)
- The Best of Andy Capp (No. 5) (1960)
- Laugh with Andy Capp (No. 6) (1961)
- The World of Andy Capp (No. 7) (1961)
- More Andy Capp (No. 8) (1962)
- Andy Capp (No. 9)
- Andy Capp Picks His Favourites (No. 10) (1963)
- Happy Days with Andy Capp (No. 11) (1963)
- Laugh at Life with Andy Capp (No. 12) (1964)
- Andy Capp and Florrie (No. 13) (1964)
- All the Best from Andy Capp (No. 14) (1965)
- Andy Capp (Nos. 15–20) (1965–1968)
- The Cream of Andy Capp (1965) First hardcover collection
- Andy Capp: His 21st Book (1968)
- Andy Capp (Nos. 22–46) (1969–1982)
- Laugh Again with Andy Capp – 23 volumes (1968–1980)
- The World of Andy Capp – 16 volumes (1981–1995)
- The World of Andy Capp (1990) Titan
- Andy Capp in Colour: After a Few (1992) Ravette
- Andy Capp in Colour: Don't Wait Up (1992) Ravette
- Andy Capp in Colour: On Cue (1993) Ravette
- Andy Capp in Colour: A Barrel of Laughs (1993) Ravette
- Andy Capp Through the Ages: 1957–2000 (2000) Syndication International
- The New Andy Capp Collection Number 1 (2004) David and Charles Books
- The New Andy Capp Collection Number 2 (2005) David and Charles Books
- Andy Capp at 50 (2006) David and Charles Books
- Andy Capp Annual 2011 (2010) Titan

=== Australia ===
- Andy Capp, Man of the Moment! (1977) Mirror Books
- Down the Hatch, Andy Capp! (1977) Mirror Books
- Who's Buying, Andy Capp? (1977) Mirror Books
- You're a Winner, Andy Capp! (1977) Mirror Books
- Lots More Andy Capp (1980) Castle Books
- Amazing Andy Capp (1981) Castle
- Everlovin' Andy Capp (1981) Castle
- This Is Your Life, Andy Capp! (1981) Castle
- Leave 'Em Laughing, Andy Capp (1982) Castle
- Flo & Andy at It Again (1982) Castle
- You Little Beauty, Andy Capp (1982) Castle
- The Incredible Andy Capp (1982) Castle
- We Still Luv You, Andy Capp (1982) Castle
- Howzat! Andy Capp (1983) Castle
- Laugh at Life with Andy Capp (1983) Castle
- Big Mouth Andy Capp (1983) Castle
- Summer Fun with Andy Capp (1983) Castle
- Amorous Andy Capp (1983) Castle
- Good Sport Andy Capp (1983) Castle
- Raging Andy Capp (1984) Castle
- I Can't Stand Andy Capp! (1984) Castle
- It's a Hard Life, Andy Capp (1984) Castle
- Romantic Andy Capp (1984) Horwitz Grahame Books
- Strike Again, Andy Capp! (1984) HGB
- The New Image Andy Capp (1984) HGB
- Nobody's Perfect, Andy Capp (1985) HGB
- Down Another, Andy Capp (1986) HGB
- The Laid Back Andy Capp (1986) HGB
- The Andy and Flo Show (1987) HGB
- Educating Andy Capp (1987) HGB
- The Liberated Andy Capp (1985) HGB
- You're Fine 'n Dandy, Andy Capp (1987) Budget Books
- Sporting Life of Andy Capp (1987) Budget Books
- Up the Pub with Andy Capp (1987) Budget Books
- Andy Capp: After Hours (1987) Budget Books
- Andy Capp: Home Sweet Home (1987) Budget Books
- Andy Capp: A Look Inside (1987) Budget Books
- Outrageous Andy Capp (1987) HGB
- The Return of Andy Capp (1988) HGB
- The Trivial Pursuit of Andy Capp (1988) HGB
- Good Morning, Andy Capp (1988) HGB
- Trouble in Paradise with Andy Capp (1988) HGB
- On the Run with Andy Capp (1989) HGB
- Taking It Easy with Andy Capp (1989) HGB
- Late Again, Andy Capp (1989) HGB
- Bounce Back with Andy Capp (1990) HGB
- Help Yourself, Andy Capp (1990) HGB

== Adaptations ==
=== Stage ===
In 1981, a stage musical based on the strip had a short run at London's Aldwych Theatre, with songs by Alan Price and Trevor Peacock, starring Tom Courtenay as Andy and Val McLane as Florrie. The stage show also produced an original West End cast recording, released on LP record by Key Records in 1982. The musical was reprised in 2016 at the Finborough Theatre in London, with Roger Alborough portraying Andy.

=== Television ===
An attempt to transfer Andy Capp to television in 1988 met with little success. The well-known British character actor James Bolam played Andy on ITV. The Thames Television series consisted of six episodes that were shown once and have never been repeated. The series was poorly received and attracted some criticism for the way it played up to supposed stereotypes of Northern working-class men. In 2012, the series was released on DVD (Region 2) in the UK, licensed by Fremantle Media Ltd to the Network Label (VFD64669 / Network 7953656).

=== Computer game ===
In 1987, a computer game based on Andy Capp, entitled Andy Capp: The Game, was released for the Commodore 64, ZX Spectrum and Amstrad CPC in Europe and North America. Players had to borrow money in order to replenish Andy's alcohol supply while avoiding fights with his wife Flo and the police.

=== Snack food ===
In 1971, the American company Goodmark Foods licensed the character in the form of "Andy Capp's", a fried snack food made to resemble french fries.

=== Around the world ===
A Konkani language adaptation of the comic strip, known as Anton Chepekar (आंंतोन चेपेंकार) used to feature in the Konkani daily Sunaparant.

== Appearances in other media ==
Homer Simpson reads an Andy Capp strip in the The Simpsons episode "Marge vs. the Monorail" and humorously refers to Andy as a “wife-beating drunk”.

Andy Capp appeared twice in Family Guy. In the first appearance, he and Peter are playing darts at a bar and, when an angry Flo appears, she and Andy have a comic-strip style fight, into which Quagmire is unwittingly drawn. The second appearance is when he performs a version of a pap smear, referred to as a "Capp" smear, on Lois. On both occasions, he speaks with a Cockney accent.

French band Les Rita Mitsouko published a song about Andy Capp, "Andy", in 1986, referring in its lyrics to Andy Capp, with the singer Catherine Ringer expressing her wish to make love to him.

In the 23rd July 2026 edition of the Metro, regular cartoonist Guy ("with apologies to Reg Smythe") produced a caricature of Andy Burnham in the style of Andy Capp, under the headline "Andy Tap!". In Guy's version, Andy's cap does not cover his eyes, but leave his glasses prominent. The story covered Burnham's intention to extend nationally the contactless "tap in/tap out" system of bus ticketing used in Manchester and London.

== Related comics ==
When the children's comic Buster was launched in 1960, its masthead character was entitled "Buster: Son of Andy Capp". Buster wore a cloth cap similar to Andy's until 1992, but the connection was not recognised in the parent strip and had limited development in the children's comic. Buster often referred to his father, and Andy was seen in the comic attempting to find a gas leak in three frames of the 18 June 1960 strip. He was also shown in two drawn photographs in the 2 July 1960 issue, the first of which was displayed by Buster's mum with the pronouncement: "It's a photo of Buster taken with Andy! You can see he's got his dad's fine straight nose". Buster's mum was often referred to by name and was consistently drawn to resemble Andy's wife Flo. The connection with Andy Capp was soon dropped from the comic.

== See also ==
- The Lockhorns
- The Better Half
