= Blue Bonnet (brand) =

American brand of margarine

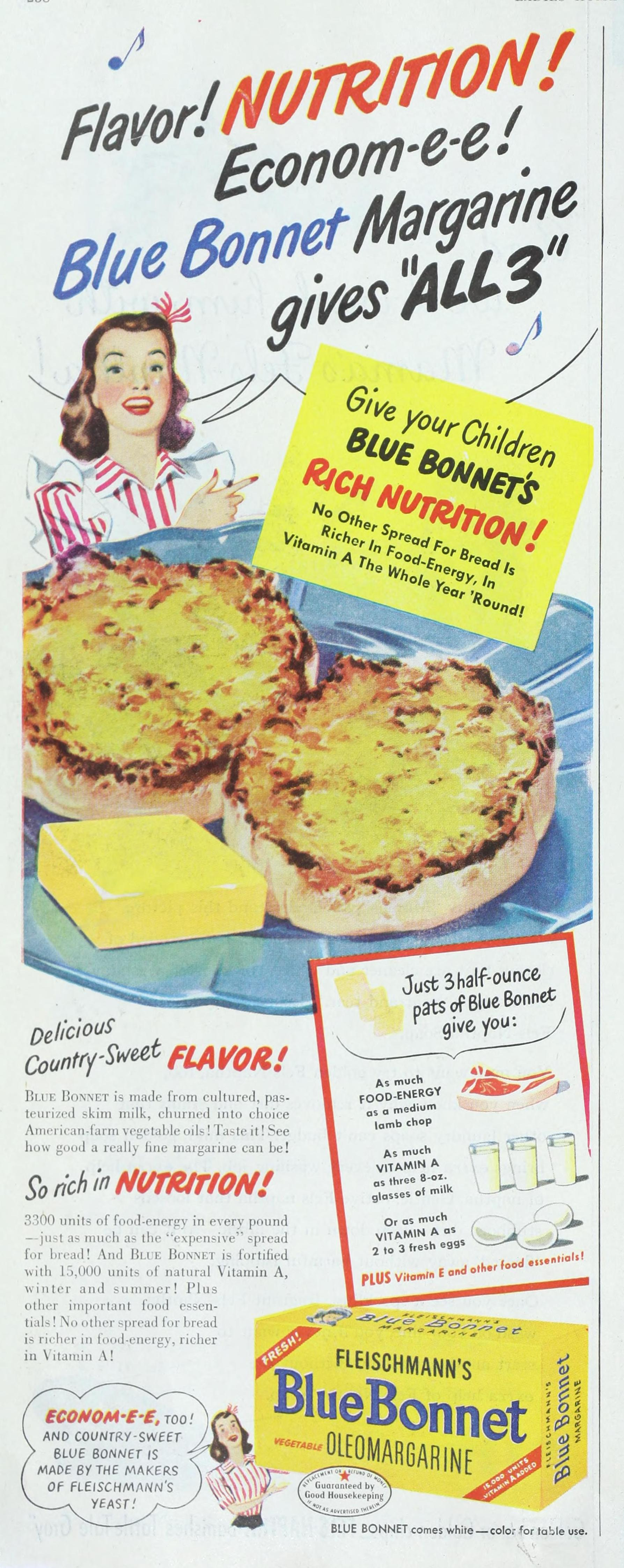
1948 advertisement in Ladies' Home Journal

Blue Bonnet is an American brand of margarine and other bread spreads and baking fats, owned by ConAgra Foods. Original owner Standard Brands merged with Nabisco in July 1981, but Nabisco ultimately sold Blue Bonnet to ConAgra, along with a number of other food brands, in 1998.

Per federal regulation margarine must have a minimum fat content of 80 percent (with a maximum of 16% water) to be labeled as such in the United States. At 53%, Blue Bonnet does not qualify.

The words to their slogan and jingle are: "Everything's better with Blue Bonnet on it!" A common phrase citing this brand of margarine includes "I'm on it like Blue Bonnet!" indicating the individual is in control of the circumstance.
