= Crunch 'n Munch =

Brand of caramel corn

Crunch 'n Munch Buttery Toffee flavor

Crunch 'n Munch is an American brand of snack food produced by Conagra Brands consisting of caramel-coated popcorn and peanuts.

== History ==
Crunch 'n Munch was first sold in 1966 by the Franklin Nut Company. In 1980, it was sold to American Home Foods (a division of American Home Products), which was spun off and renamed International Home Foods in 1996. In 2000, ConAgra purchased International Home Foods.

In 2004, the New York Yankees baseball team replaced Cracker Jack (which has a stronger molasses flavor) with the milder, buttery Crunch 'n Munch at home games. The club switched back to Cracker Jack after immediate public outcry.

== See also ==
- Cracker Jack
- Poppycock
- Fiddle Faddle
- List of popcorn brands
- Screaming Yellow Zonkers
