= Slim Jim (snack food) =

American brand of meat snack

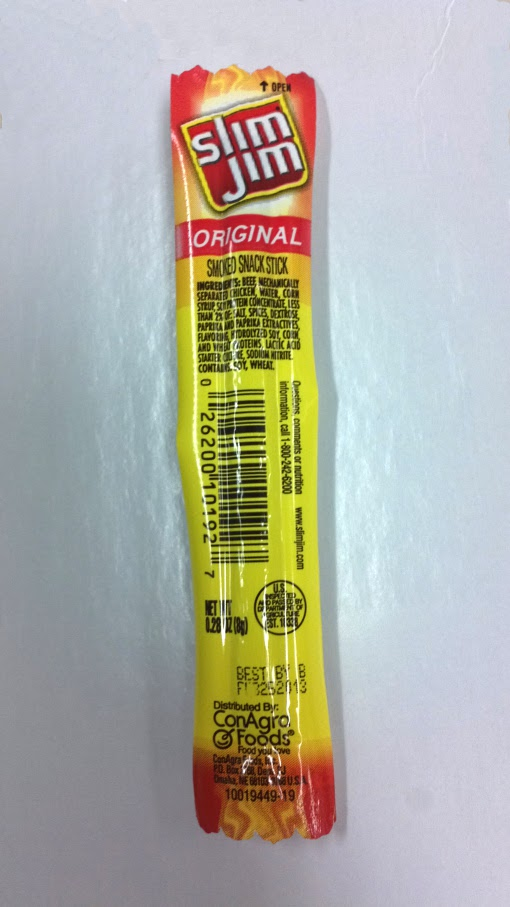
- A packaged mini Slim Jim stick
- Product type: Meat snack
- Current owner: ConAgra Brands
- Country: United States
- Introduced: 1929; 97 years ago
- Previous owners: General Mills; GoodMark Foods
- Tagline: Snap into a Slim Jim!
- Website: slimjim.com

Slim Jim is an American meat snack brand sold and manufactured by Conagra Brands. Slim Jim snacks are widely available and popular in the United States, generating $575 million in revenue in 2015. About 1 billion Slim Jim snacks are produced annually in at least 21 varieties.

== History ==
The first Slim Jim was invented in 1929 in Philadelphia, by Al Levis and his business partner (and brother-in-law) Joseph Cherry. In the 1940s, they hired a meatpacker to develop the product for production. In 1967, Levis sold the company for about $20 million to General Mills. General Mills moved the operations of the Slim Jim brand to Raleigh, North Carolina, where they then merged them into the meatpacking operations of another company they had acquired at around the same time, Jesse Jones Sausage Co., creating GoodMark Foods.

Ron Doggett moved to Raleigh in 1969 after being named corporate controller of the newly formed entity; he would later act as the company's Vice President of Finance.

In 1982, General Mills put the company up for sale, and Doggett and three other GoodMark executives acquired the company; Doggett then became GoodMark's president and chief operating officer. Conagra bought GoodMark in 1998. Until 2009, the former Jones Sausage plant in Garner, North Carolina was the only facility in the world which produced Slim Jims.

The product Levis created is different from the one produced since the 1990s, with Lon Adams (1925–2020) developing the current Slim Jim recipe while working for Goodmark.

Production of Slim Jims was interrupted following the 2009 ConAgra Foods plant explosion and fire on June 9, 2009, which heavily damaged the plant in Garner, and killed three workers and a subcontractor worker. Conagra reopened the plant six weeks after the incident. Since it could only produce at about half of its original capacity following the plant's damage, ConAgra arranged for other facilities to produce Slim Jims, including a facility in Troy, Ohio. On May 20, 2011, the facility in Garner, North Carolina closed. On the same day, Slim Jim's former spokesman, "Macho Man" Randy Savage, died.

== Advertising campaigns ==
On of Slim Jim's most well-known advertising campaigns was developed at North Castle Partners in Greenwich, Connecticut, by Tom Leland and Roger Martensen, under the creative direction of Hal Rosen. The "Snap into a Slim Jim!" concept was originally intended for comedian Sam Kinison, but his legal team didn't permit it. Hal Rosen then suggested using WWF (now WWE) wrestlers, and Ultimate Warrior was selected for the kickoff spot. In addition to a TV spot, Ultimate Warrior also recorded several radio commercials for Slim Jim in 1991.

From 1993 to 2000, advertising for the product heavily featured professional wrestler "Macho Man" Randy Savage, who served as spokesperson. Each commercial would close with Savage bellowing "Need a little excitement? Snap into a Slim Jim!". The campaign not only boosted overall sales but also raised Slim Jim’s profile among teenage male consumers, a demographic that remains at the heart of its following to this day.

Other notable commercials have included rapper Vanilla Ice, wrestlers Bam Bam Bigelow, Kevin Nash, Edge, Bianca Belair, LA Knight and Jey Uso.

A subsequent campaign featured Slim Jim Guy (played by actor Demetri Goritsas), a human personification of a Slim Jim who would wreak havoc on the digestive system of anyone who ate it and used the slogan "Eat me!" These ads personified the irreverent personality of the brand and were also from North Castle Partners. He also appears as unlockable character in the video game Dave Mirra's Freeestyle BMX 2.

Slim Jim advertisements were also heavily featured on MTV, ESPN, and WCW. Slim Jim was one of the earliest sponsors of the ASA Pro Tour (the aggressive inline skating tour) from 1997 to 2000. The ASA Pro Tour was a qualifier for ESPN's X Games.

In 2005, Slim Jim advertising featured the Fairy Snapmother, described in a Conagra press release as "a character resembling a tattooed rocker with wings – and a familiar MTV-type of humor young males enjoy."

Another campaign depicted hunters hunting a fictitious "Snapalope" within convenience stores using urban camouflage. The Snapalope is a deer-like puppet made from Slim Jims.

In 2008, Slim Jim launched the website "SpicySide.com", encouraging consumers to get in touch with their "Spicy Side" by creating an avatar and fighting their friends in an online landscape called Spicy Town. Slim Jim also partnered with a well known Machinima artist Myndflame to develop a World of Warcraft parody.

Slim Jim sponsored Bobby Labonte and David Green when they won the NASCAR Busch Series championship in 1991 and 1994, respectively.

In June 2025, WWE and Slim Jim announced a multi-year partnership extension, which includes Slim Jim being the center ring sponsor of Raw, and includes Slim Jim branding being featured on all folding tables across all WWE tentpole programming.

== Ingredients ==
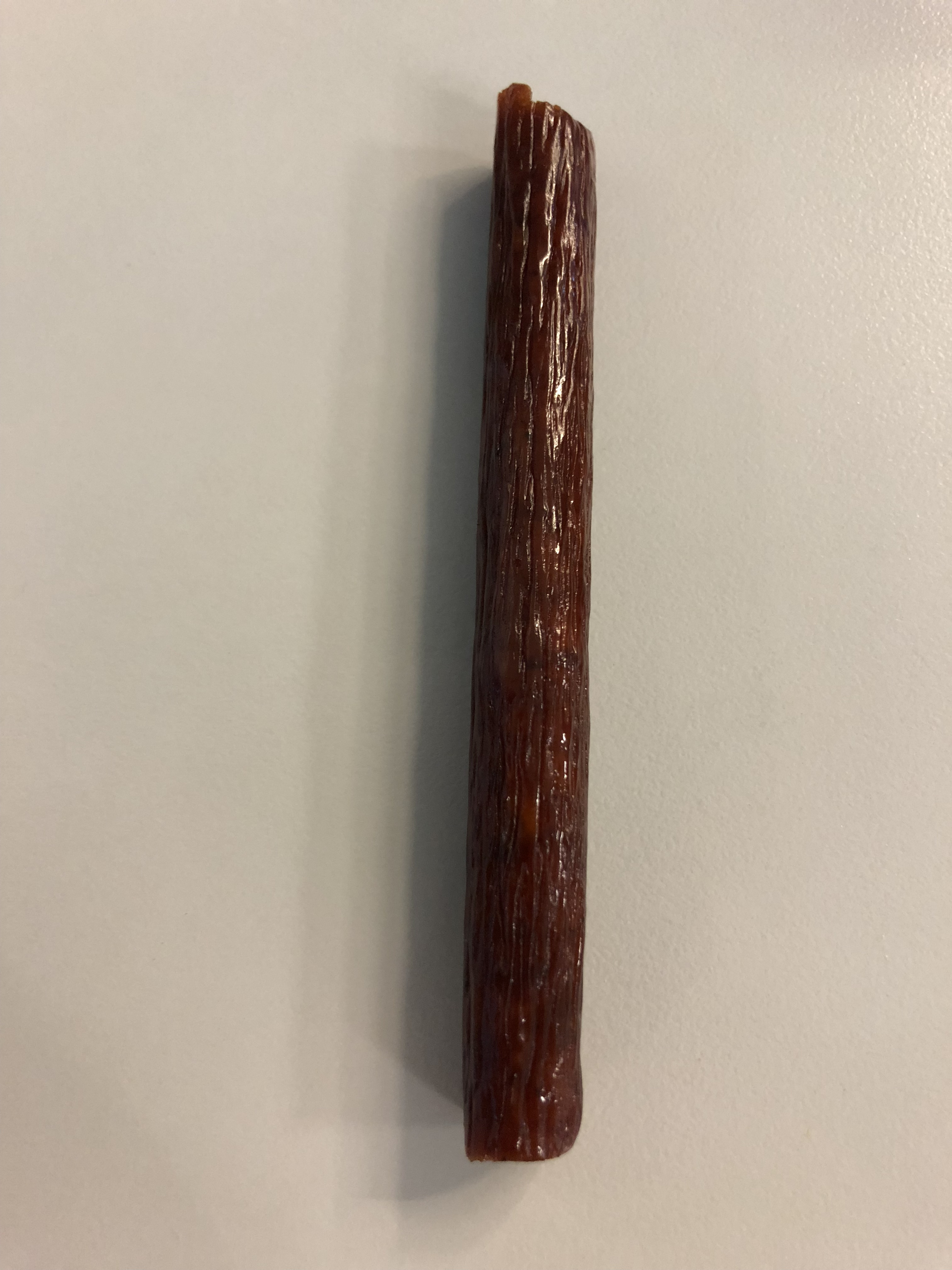
A Slim Jim after removal of packaging

A 2009 Wired article listed some of the ingredients as beef, mechanically separated chicken, lactic acid starter culture, dextrose, salt, sodium nitrite, and hydrolyzed soy. They note that although Conagra refers to Slim Jim as a "meat stick", it resembles a fermented sausage, such as salami or pepperoni, which uses bacteria and sugar to produce lactic acid, lowering the pH of the sausage to around 5.0 and firming up the meat.

Sodium nitrite is added to prevent the meat from turning gray, and hydrolyzed soy contains monosodium glutamate. However, since 2010, pork is a staple ingredient in the "Original" Slim Jim, alongside beef and mechanically separated chicken.

== Varieties ==
Slim Jim has launched several spin-off products of its main brand. These products are often of higher quality than the original Slim Jim, using premium meats. Such products include both tender steak strips and beef jerky.

The tender steak strips come in three flavors. Its companion beef jerky comes in four flavors: an original flavor, two spicy flavors, and one smokin' apple flavor.

== See also ==
- List of brand name snack foods
- Peperami
- Kabanos
