= GoodMark Foods =

American food manufacturer

- Company type: Subsidiary
- Industry: Food industry
- Founded: 1970; 56 years ago
- Defunct: June 18, 1998
- Fate: Acquired
- Successor: ConAgra
- Headquarters: Raleigh, North Carolina, United States
- Area served: United States
- Products: Meat snacks, packaged meats, and extruded grain snacks
- Number of employees: 1,100
- Parent: ConAgra
- Website: www.conagra.com

GoodMark Foods was an American food manufacturing company, based in Raleigh, North Carolina. It produced "meat snacks, packaged meats, and extruded grain snacks," especially Slim Jim jerky meat snacks. It is owned by ConAgra.

== Company history ==
Slim Jim snacks originated in Philadelphia. Its manufacturer Cherry-Levis Food Company was sold to General Mills in 1967 for about $20 million and renamed Slim Jim, Inc. In 1970, General Mills purchased Jesse Jones Sausage Co. in Garner, North Carolina, and formed GoodMark Foods, Inc. to make Slim Jims there.

Ron Doggett, a General Mills finance executive involved in the purchase of Cherry-Levis, moved to North Carolina to participate in managing the operations. "In June 1982, he directed a unique leveraged buyout with three other executives of GoodMark from General Mills, who had put the subsidiary up for sale." They made the company public in 1985. The company's stock was traded on NASDAQ as GDMK.

It was acquired by ConAgra, Inc. in 1998 for $225 million. GoodMark's annual sales were about $170 million at that time. A year later, in 1999, Doggett retired as chairman, president and CEO.

== Products and brands ==
- Slim Jim meat snacks
- Penrose sausages
- Pemmican meat snacks
- Andy Capp's grain snacks
- Jesse Jones sausages
- Bugles (as of 1970s)
