= Andy Capp's =

American snack brand

- Product type: French-fry like corn/potato snacks
- Current owner: ConAgra Foods
- Country: United States
- Introduced: 1971; 55 years ago
- Markets: Worldwide
- Previous owners: GoodMark Foods
- Website: Andy Capp's

Andy Capp's is an American brand of flavored corn and potato snack made to look like French fries. The product was created in 1971 by GoodMark Foods, which licensed the name and likeness of the comic strip character Andy Capp from Publishers-Hall Syndicate. In 1998 GoodMark Foods was acquired by ConAgra Foods, which manufactures and distributes the product to this day.

Andy Capp's fries come in 0.85 ounces (24 grams), 1 ounce (28 grams), 1.5 ounces (43 grams), 1.75 ounces (50 grams), 2.0 ounces (57 grams), 3.0 ounces (85 grams), 3.5 ounces (99 grams), 6 ounces (170 grams), and more recently, 8 ounces (230 grams) packages. Packages come in seven flavors: Hot Fries, Ranch Fries, Cheddar Fries, BBQ Fries, Fire Fries, Beer Battered Onion Rings and Beer Battered Onion Rings: Hot, the last of which are shaped like onion rings as opposed to fries, and are now hot. Hot Fries were the first popular flavor in this line of snack foods. On the back of some packages, Zesty Ranch was listed as one of the flavors, and was distributed to schools for snack purchases. The Pub Fries, Salsa, Hot Chili Cheese Steak, and White Cheddar Steak Fries flavors have all been discontinued.

The BBQ Fries, after being discontinued, resurfaced in 2011 in a new bag design made to match the current Hot Fries flavors.
