= Banquet Foods =

Frozen food brand

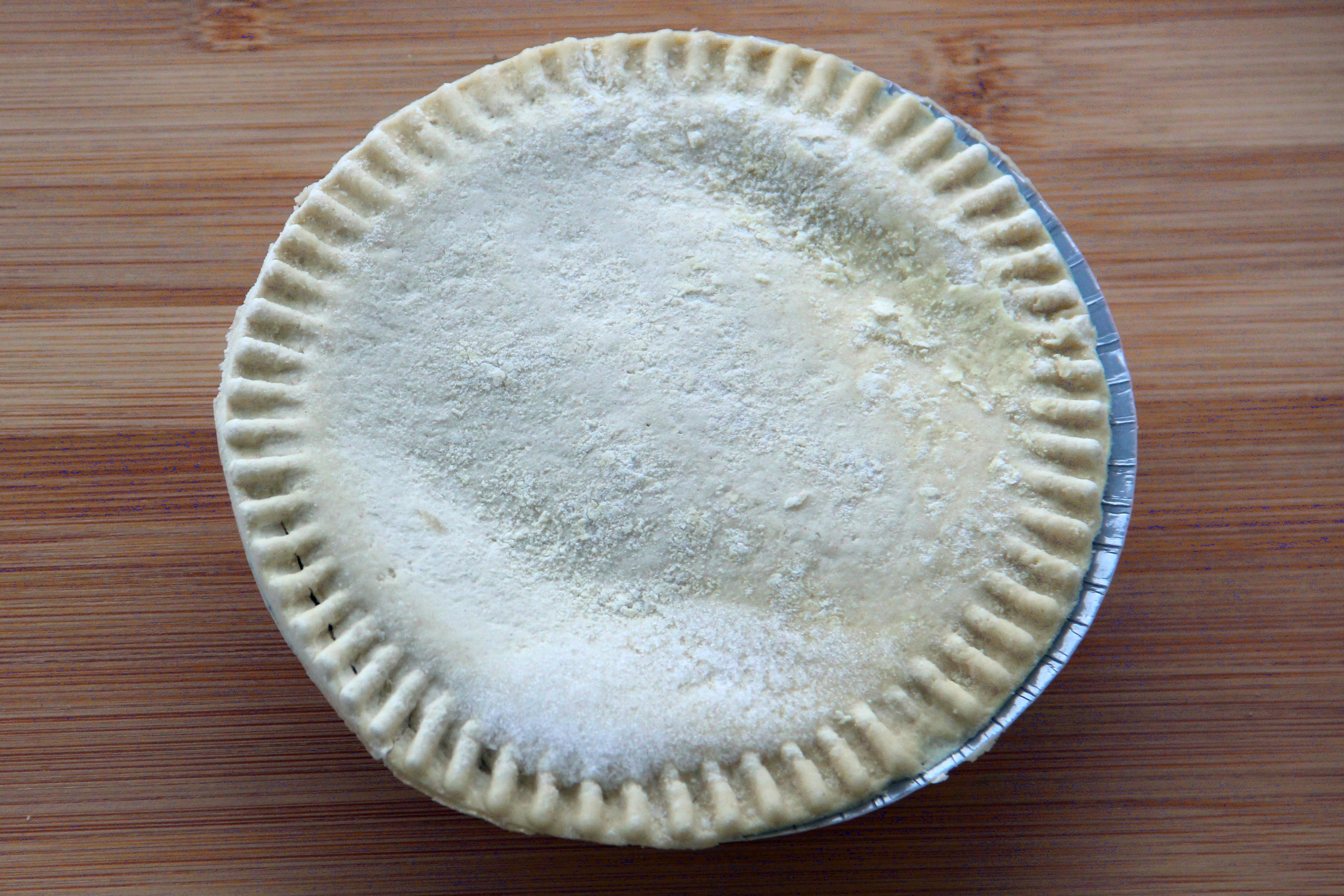
Frozen pot pie from Banquet Foods

Banquet Foods is a subsidiary of Conagra Brands that sells various food products, including frozen pre-made entrées, meals, and desserts. The brand is best known for its line of TV dinners. Banquet was founded in 1892 in Missouri before it launched a range of frozen pies in 1953. Banquet first hit the store shelves in 1955, offering frozen dinners. Soon after that, Banquet became popular with their Cookin' Bags products.

Banquet was known primarily for a frozen breaded chicken, but expanded into other chicken products over the years, including chicken pot pies, chicken nuggets, ready-to-heat microwaveable dinners and buffalo wings.

In 1970, the company was purchased by RCA, which in turn sold it to Conagra in 1980. In 2004, Banquet introduced Homestyle Bakes – ready to bake dinner kits in 11 varieties, as well as Dessert Bakes – no-bake pie and cake mixes. With the 2007 sale of former Conagra division Swift & Company to JBS USA, the popular frozen breakfast sausage line formerly known as "Swift Premium Brown & Serve" was briefly rebranded under the Armour name, then to "Banquet Brown & Serve" by the end of 2009.

== Product incidents ==
On October 11, 2007, food manufacturer Conagra Brands (then ConAgra Foods) asked stores to pull its Banquet and generic brand chicken and turkey pot pies due to 152 cases of salmonella poisoning in 31 states being linked to the consumption of Conagra pot pies, with 20 people hospitalized. A final report by the CDC determined that there were 401 cases across 41 states, with approximately one-third of all cases resulting in hospitalization. By October 12, a full recall was announced, affecting all varieties of frozen pot pies sold under the brands Banquet, Albertsons, Cub Foods, Food Lion, Great Value, Hill Country Fare, Kirkwood, Kroger, Meijer, and Western Family Foods. The recalled pot pies included all varieties in 7-oz (200-g) single-serving packages bearing the number P-9 or “Est. 1059” printed on the side of the package. When the pies returned to the market, cooking temperature requirements for serving were made more apparent on the packaging; competitor brands also followed suit.

== See also ==
- Impact of the 2019–20 coronavirus pandemic on the meat industry in the United States
