= Lolly Gobble Bliss Bombs =

Snack food

- A packet of Lolly Gobble Bliss Bombs
- Type: Caramelised, ready-to-eat, popcorn
- Course: Snack
- Place of origin: Australia
- Main ingredients: Popcorn
- Ingredients generally used: Toffee, peanuts

Lolly Gobble Bliss Bombs are an Australian snack food made by the Greens food company.

Originally released in the 1970s, it is caramelised, ready-to-eat popcorn, similar to the American Cracker Jack. The concept was first floated in the late 1960s, but the company delayed the product due to uncertainty of the market appeal. The popcorn is coated with toffee and rolled in crushed peanuts. Flavours include butterscotch and caramel.

Lolly Gobble Bliss Bombs were known for their colourful packaging, which featured surreal psychedelic artwork. The initial marketing was developed by Frank Margan, the creative director at John Singleton's SPASM agency. This packaging was varied in the late 1980s.

Lolly Gobble Bliss Bombs were launched by margarine maker Marrickville Holdings in the early 1970s, generating significant sales in the mid and late 1970s. In 1980 Marrickville Holdings was purchased by Allied Mills, which continued to advertise the brand despite flagging sales. In 1986 Allied Mills amalgamated with the Goodman Group to become Goodman Fielder. The new company ceased to promote Lolly Gobble Bliss Bombs and let distribution decline. In 1991 Goodman Fielder sold the brand together with the ETA and Daffodil nuts brands to Southern Cross Foods, a relative newcomer to the snackfood market, for $AUD 10 million.

In December 1992, Southern Cross collapsed and Lolly Gobble Bliss Bombs were sold to Barton Addison & Sons, a company that marketed peanuts and peanut butter. In 1994 Greens purchased Barton Addison, primarily to secure its peanut butter brands, and in 1998 launched a major advertising campaign to promote the brand.

== See also ==
- Screaming Yellow Zonkers, another candy coated popcorn with unusual packaging
- List of brand name snack foods
- List of popcorn brands
