= Hostess CupCake =

American snack cake brand

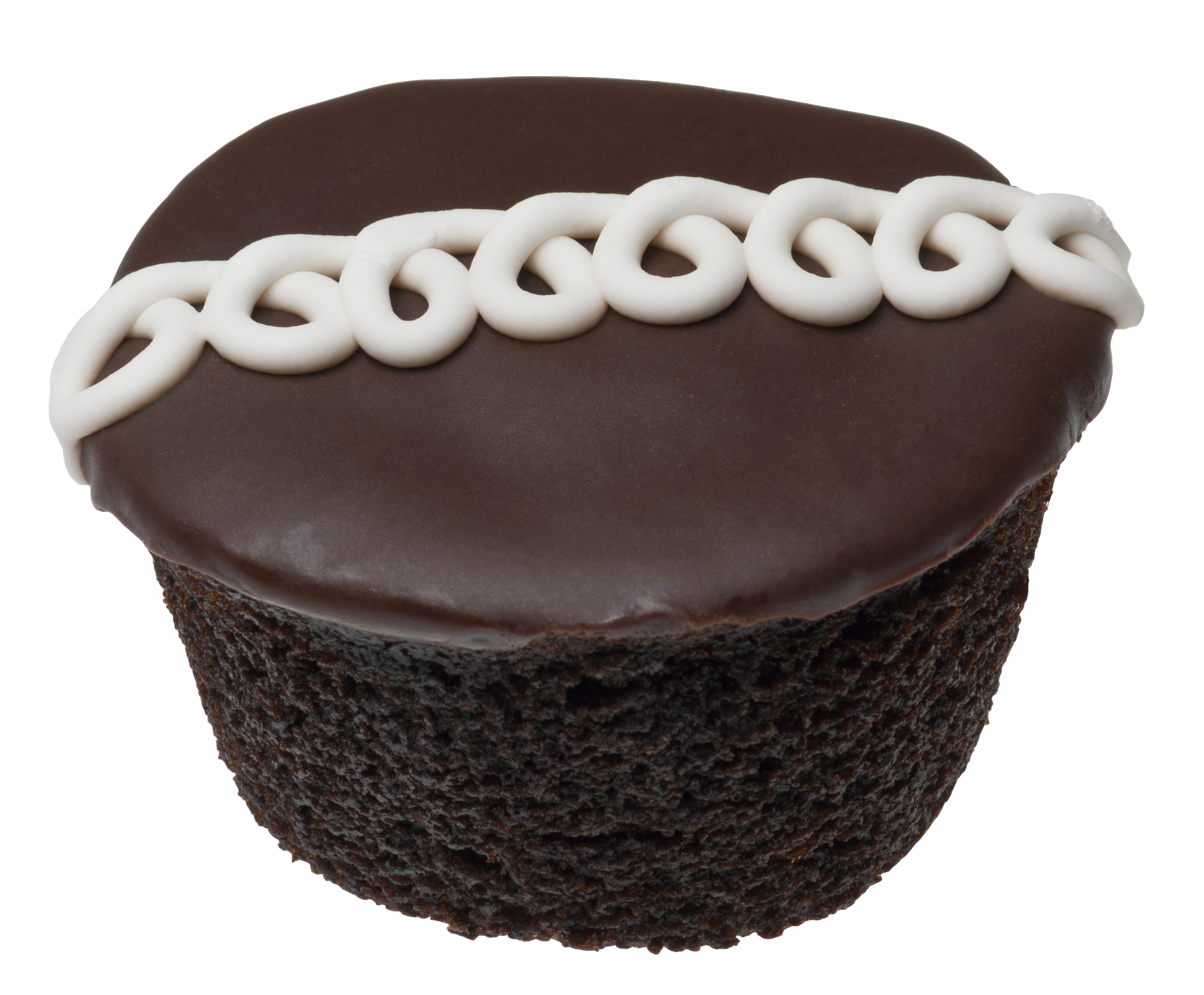
A chocolate Hostess CupCake, showing the chocolate cake and icing, and the signature line of white squiggles

Hostess CupCake is an American brand of snack cake produced and distributed by Hostess Brands and currently owned by The J.M. Smucker Company. Its most common form is a chocolate cupcake with chocolate icing and vanilla creme filling, with seven distinctive white squiggles across the top. However, other flavors have been available at times. It has been claimed to be the first commercially produced cupcake and has become an iconic American brand.

== History ==
The Hostess CupCake was first sold on May 10, 1919. According to author Andrew F. Smith, it was the first commercially produced cupcake, originally produced by the Taggart Bakery as the Chocolate Cup Cake. Hostess has also claimed that it was "the first snack cake ever introduced to the market." In 1989, rival Tastykake disputed this claim, stating that they introduced the first snack cake.

Originally, two cupcakes were sold for five cents. Different flavors were offered during the early years, including cupcakes topped with vanilla or malted milk flavored icing. During the 1940s, an orange flavored cupcake was developed, with orange cake and icing. But until 1950, the Hostess CupCake did not have any filling or the white squiggly line across the top.

In 1947, D.R. "Doc" Rice, who started his career at Hostess in 1938 with a job that entailed dumping baked cakes on a table, was given the task of developing the Hostess CupCake further. These developments culminated in an updated cupcake in 1950. A white line consisting of squiggles was added to the top in order to distinguish the Hostess CupCake from other brands. The vanilla creme filling was also added. Rice got the idea for using a creme filling when a new machine for injecting filling into Hostess Twinkies became available. Improvements were also made to the cake mix and the chocolate icing in 1950. According to Rice, the updated cupcakes were first produced and test marketed in Detroit.

Other flavors of Hostess CupCakes that have been available at times have been golden (vanilla with chocolate icing) and strawberry.

In 1988, 400 million Hostess CupCakes were sold. As of 2011, Hostess sells over 600 million CupCakes each year. Although Hostess Brands entered into bankruptcy protection in 2012, the company planned to continue making CupCakes and other snack cakes such as Twinkies and Sno Balls. These plans were derailed by the company's liquidation and announcement that they were going out of business on November 16, 2012. However, the company was eventually bought by Apollo Global Management, which began selling Hostess products in July 2013. The J.M. Smucker Company then acquired Hostess in September 2023.

== Manufacture ==
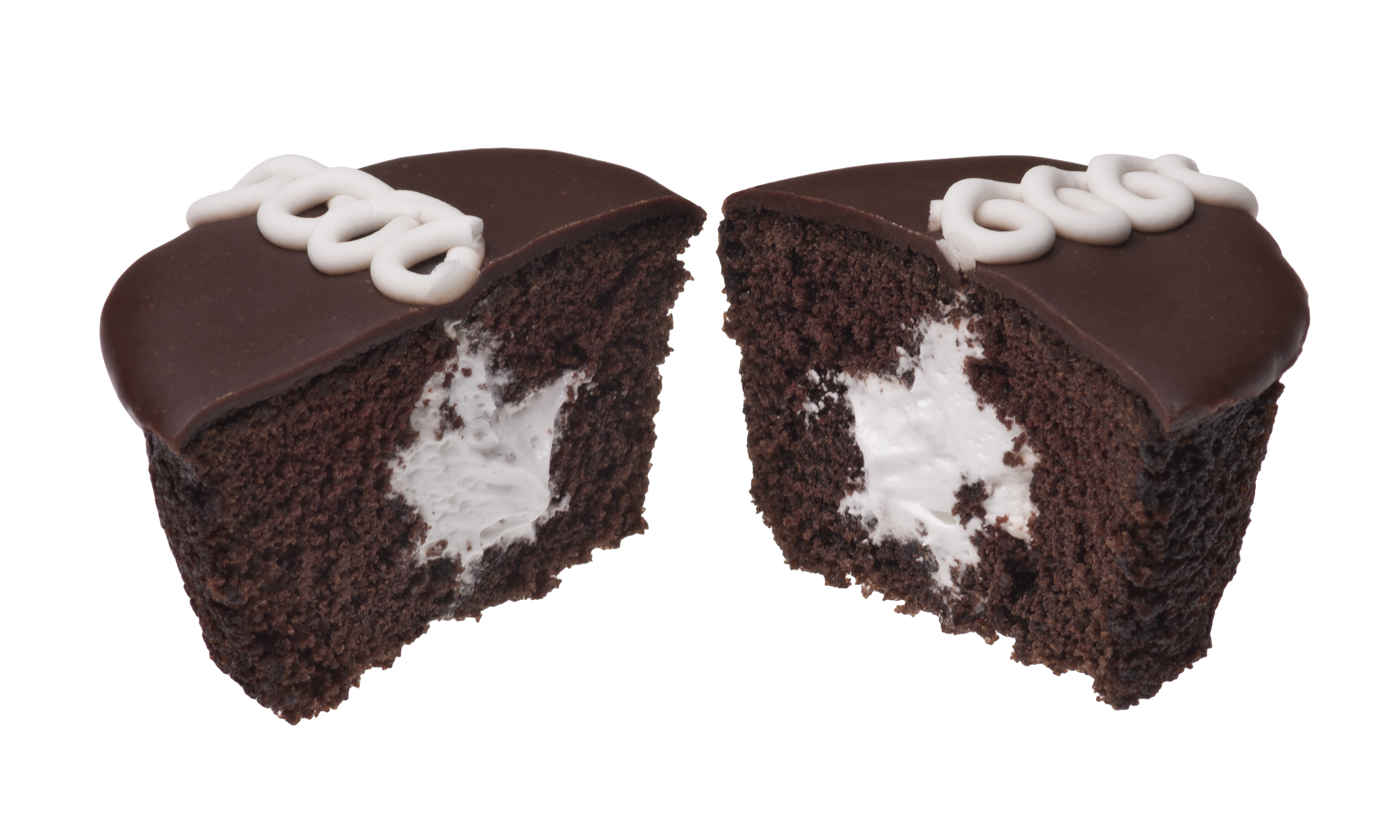
A halved CupCake, showing the cream filling

The cakes are produced from a batter which includes flour, sugar, cocoa and water. It is baked in trays for 17 minutes in a 70-foot (21 m) conveyor oven that can turn out 11,000 cupcakes an hour. After cooling, the cakes are injected through the top with the vanilla creme, then taken by conveyor to be covered on top by chocolate icing. After a special machine lays white icing in the signature squiggle the cakes are cooled then wrapped.

== Branding ==
Hostess CupCakes were marketed for a time by the animated character of Captain Cupcake, who was a companion in commercials to Twinkie the Kid and Fruit Pie the Magician. One marketing slogan that was used was "You get a big delight in every bite." Numerous commercials featured the slogan "Hey! Where's the cream filling?"

Hostess CupCakes are sold as "Pingüinos" (Penguins) in Mexico, and by extension the rest of Latin America, by regional company Marinela (the pastry division of the bread making brand Bimbo).

== Popularity ==
Hostess cupcakes have a firm place in pop culture. One survey shows that 97% of those surveyed have heard of them, and at least 71% like them. Gen X leads the way with their support at 75%. Hostess CupCakes are ranked #62 in a list of the most familiar food & snack brands. As copycat recipe sharing took hold in the early 2000s, food bloggers began and continue creating and sharing homemade versions of Hostess CupCakes, using both traditional and healthier ingredients.
