= Ding Dong =

Small chocolate cake of hockey puck size

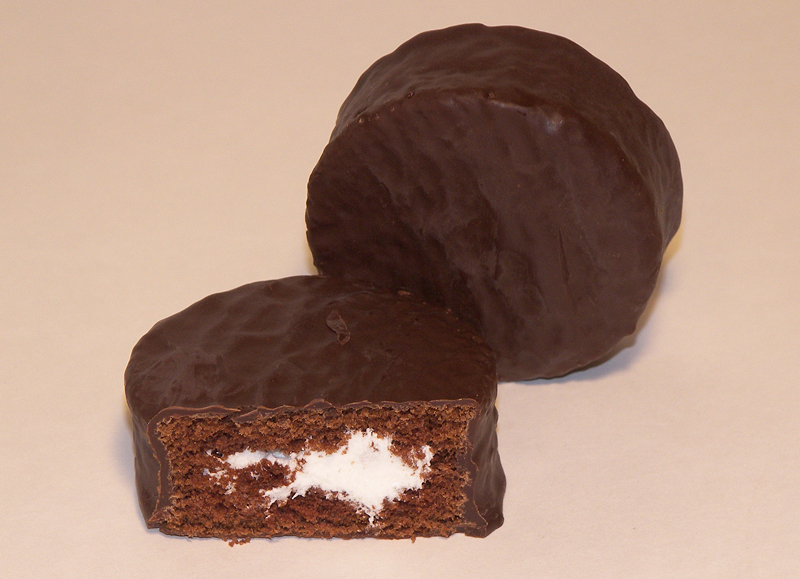
A Hostess Ding Dong

A Ding Dong is a chocolate cake produced and distributed in the United States by Hostess Brands and in Canada from Vachon Inc. under the name King Dons; in some U.S. markets, it was previously known as Big Wheels. With the exception of a brief period in 2013, the Ding Dong has been produced continuously since 1967. It is round with a flat top and bottom, close to three inches in diameter and slightly taller than an inch, similar in shape and size to a hockey puck. A white creamy filling is injected into the center and a thin coating of chocolate glaze covers the cake. The Ding Dong was originally wrapped in a square of thin aluminum foil, enabling it to be carried in lunches without melting the chocolate glaze.

== History and naming ==
The Ding Dong is similar to other cream-filled cakes such as Arcade Vachon's Jos. Louis introduced before 1934. Hostess began marketing its Ding Dong in 1967. The name was given to coincide with a television ad campaign featuring a ringing bell.

Hostess went out of business on November 16, 2012, stopping all production. The Hostess name and brands were acquired by private equity firms Apollo Global Management and Metropoulos & Co.; in June 2013, the new Hostess Brands reopened a Kansas product plant and announced that Ding Dong production would resume on July 15, 2013. The J.M. Smucker Company then acquired Hostess in September 2023.

== Ring Ding – Ding Dong conflict ==
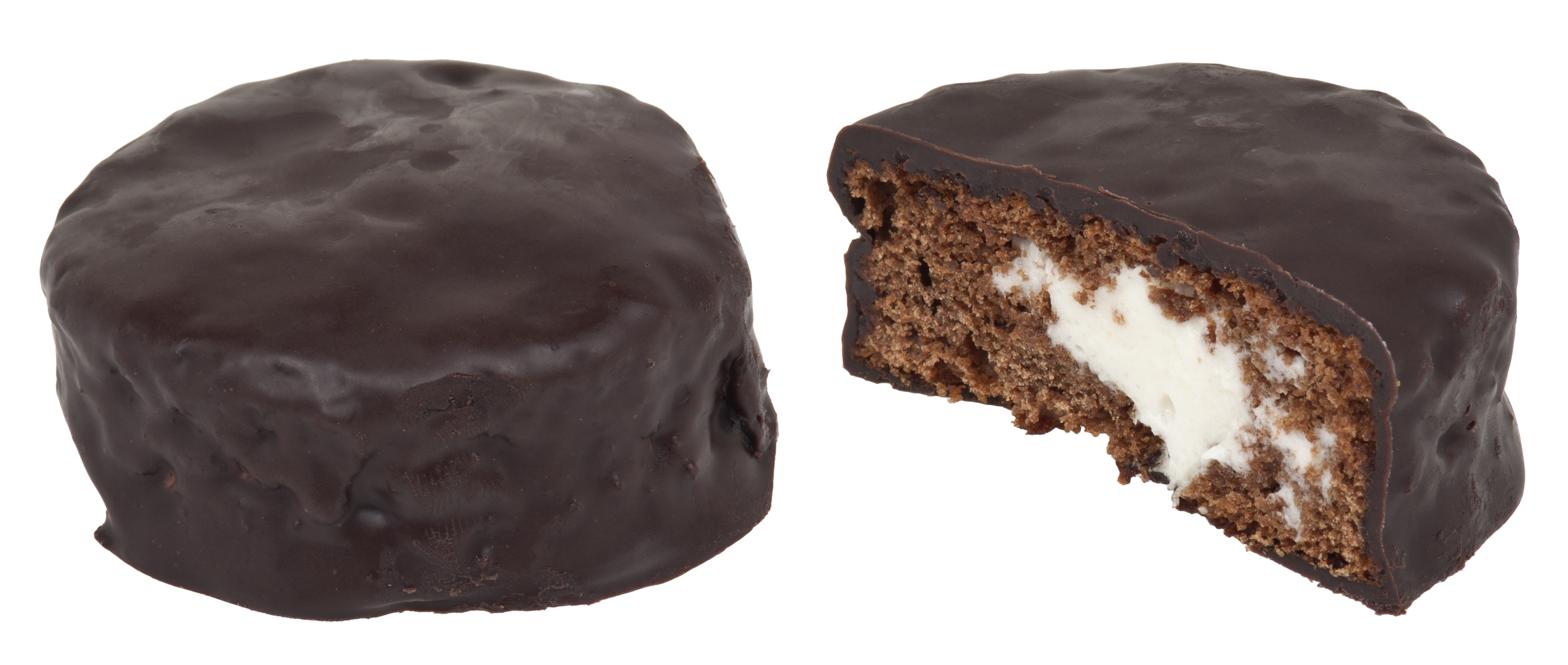
A Drake's Ring Ding

The company marketed the snacks on the East Coast as Big Wheels, to avoid confusion with Ring Dings, a similar and pre-existing treat by Drake's Cakes. The names were consolidated in 1987, when a short-lived merger of Drake's with Hostess's parent company (then Continental Baking Company) briefly resolved the Ring Ding – Ding Dong conflict. When the merged company broke up, however, Hostess was once again forced to cease using the Ding Dongs name in areas where Ring Dings were available. The compromise sound-alike name King Dons lasted until Interstate Bakeries Corporation, which had recently merged with Hostess' parent company, bought Drake's in 1998. The Hostess product was then sold under the name Ding Dongs throughout the United States, although it was still sold as King Dons in Canada.

== Cartoon characters ==
To advertise Ding Dongs, Hostess created the cartoon character King Ding Dong, an anthropomorphized Ding Dong sporting a crown and scepter. He was similar to other Hostess characters Captain Cupcake, Happy Ho Ho, Twinkie the Kid, Fruit Pie the Magician, and Chipper Brownie. Where King Dons were marketed, the character, like the product, was known as "King Don." In areas that once used the Big Wheels name, the character was previously an Indian chief named "Chief Big Wheel".

== See also ==
- Choco pie
- Ho Hos
- Twinkie
