= Devil's food cake =

Moist, airy, rich chocolate layer cake

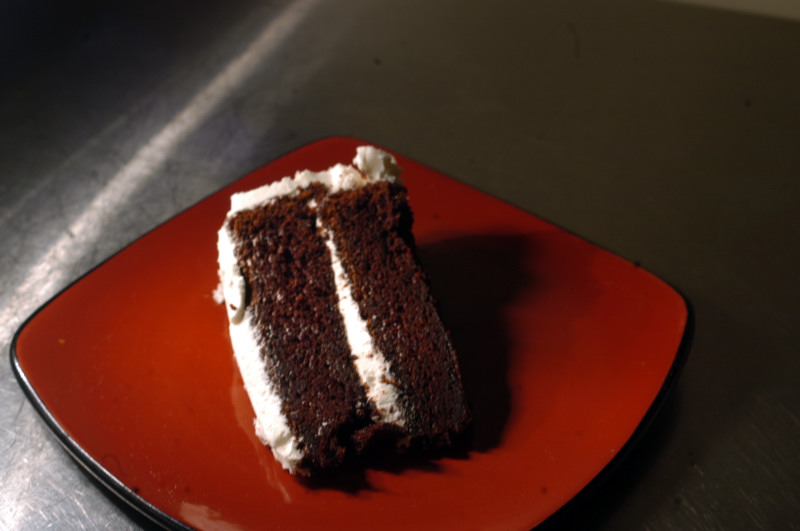
- Devil's food cake with vanilla icing
- Type: Layer cake
- Place of origin: United States
- Main ingredients: Flour, sugar, butter or substitute, eggs, cocoa powder or baking chocolate
- Variations: Red velvet cake

Devil's food cake is a chocolate layer cake that emerged in the United States at the end of the 19th century. It is characterized by its dark mahogany color, high chocolate or cocoa content, and moist texture. It is typically served as a layer cake with either chocolate or white frosting. While preparations vary widely and the name is at times used to refer to any chocolate cake, the modern devil's food can be classified as a type of chiffon cake, containing beaten eggs, sugar, and oil, and markedly distinct from early versions.

The origin of the name may reference the angel food cake, a light, airy sponge cake, which was popular in the late 19th century as the first recipes for devil's food cake were being published. With early recipes varying widely, the cake gained widespread popularity by the early 1910s. Through the 1920s, early versions of the red velvet cake began to split off, and the flavor was employed in a range of commercial products, including cake mixes and snack cakes like Hostess CupCakes and Drake's Devil Dogs. In the middle of the 20th century, community cookbooks and newspapers published many recipes for devil's food cake from contributors incensed by a popular story about the Waldorf Astoria New York charging exorbitantly for their recipe.

== Description ==
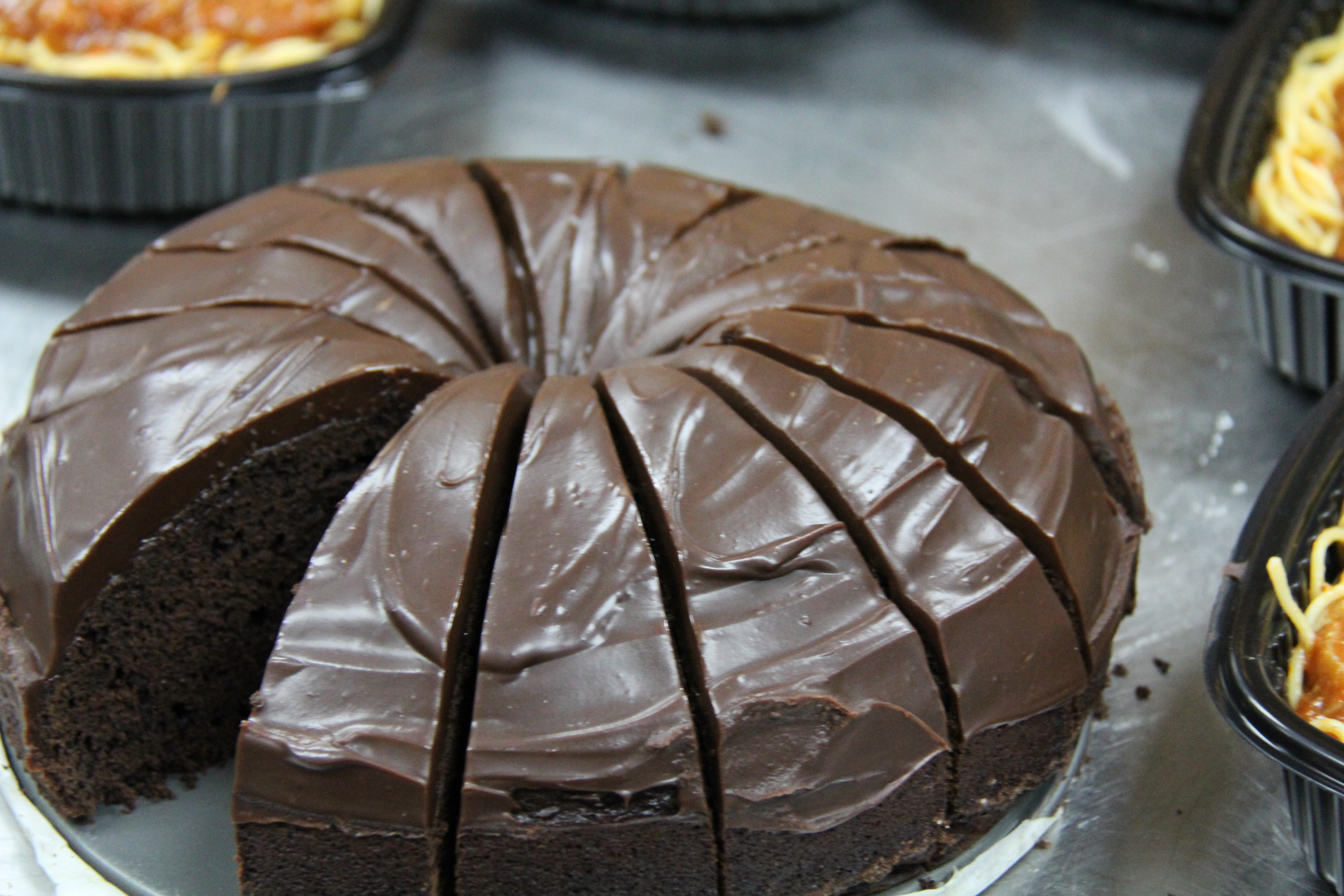
Sliced into portions

The name devil's food cake is used both to describe a moist, dark, cake with an intense chocolate flavour, and interchangeably with any chocolate cake. Recipes for devil's food cake as a unique cake cover a wide range of preparations. Paul Fehribach, a chef, describes "wild" variations in recipes among bakers.

Food writer Stella Parks describes a typical modern recipe for devil's food cake as a type of chiffon cake, including sugar, oil, and beaten eggs, with a moist and light texture, and without the buttery flavors and softness of early versions. Devil's food cakes are distinguished from other chocolate cakes by its unusually high proportion of chocolate or cocoa, which produces a more intense chocolate taste.

Devil's food cake also often contains additional baking soda, which raises the pH above that of a typical chocolate cake. Natural cocoa powder, which is slightly acidic, reacts with the baking soda, providing leavening power and turning the cake a reddish mahogany color. As the cake becomes increasingly red with the addition of more baking soda, a distinct aftertaste becomes more prominent.

Devil's food cake is usually baked in layers, then frosted. While chocolate frosting is common, the cake has long been paired with white frosting like boiled icing or divinity frosting for visual contrast. In American bakeries, devil's food cakes are among the most popular flavors.

== History ==
=== Late 19th century ===
Early references

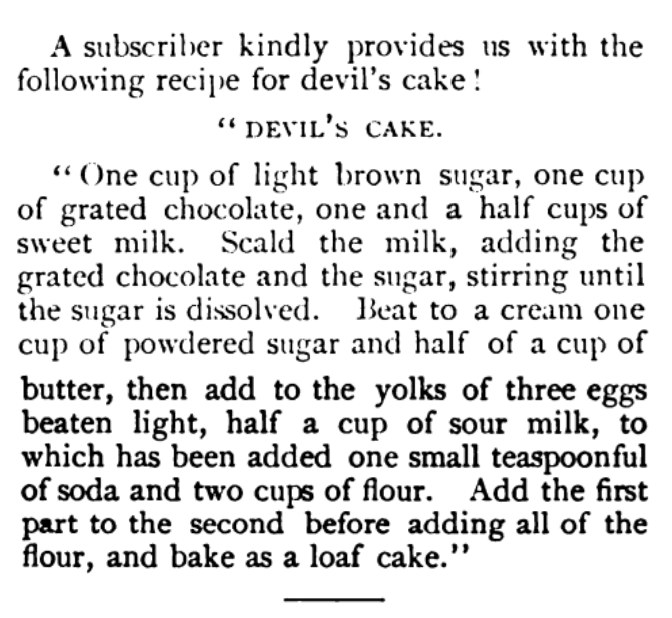
"Devil's Cake" recipe in Table Talk magazine (1893)

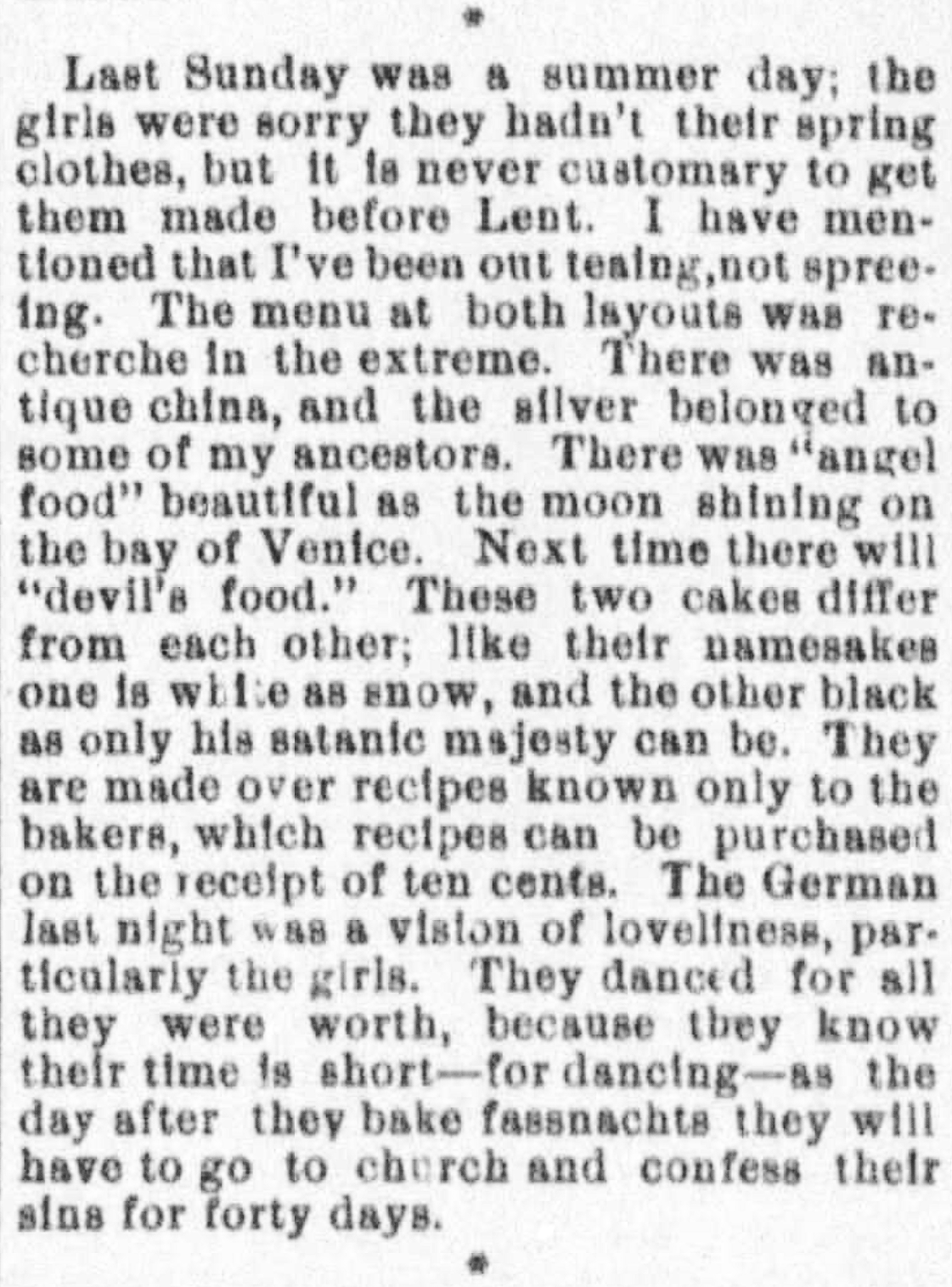
1894 description in the Maryland newspaper Frederick News

Devil's food cake emerged in the US at the end of the 19th century as chocolate became more widely used in American baking. Improvements in cocoa processing in the late 19th century and the move of cocoa production from the Americas into Asia and Africa made smoother chocolate with a new taste and industrially-produced cocoa powder widely available in grocery stores, popularizing the use of chocolate in American cuisine. Chocolate cakes from the 19th century were typically yellow cakes with chocolate frosting. The increased availability of chocolate allowed cooks to incorporate more chocolate into the cake batter, creating devil's food cake.

The first recipes under the name "Devil's Food Cake" are generally credited to Sarah Tyson Rorer in her 1902 books The New Dixie Receipt Book and Mrs. Rorer's New Cook Book, although these were not the first devil's food cakes. Parks identifies some "chocolate jelly cakes"—those made by incorporating a paste of chocolate, milk, and sugar boiled to a thick consistency through yellow cake batters—as early devil's food cakes, the earliest she found published in 1871. By 1890, references to devil's food were appearing in publications under that name, such as a contributed recipe in a New Madrid, Missouri, newspaper instructing readers in making "Black Chocolate or Devil’s Food Cake".

In 1893, a recipe for this cake under the name "Devil's Cake" was published in the nationally-distributed Table Talk magazine. Unlike some earlier recipes, this version used brown sugar and did not give cooks a choice between employing the chocolate, milk, and sugar mixture as a part of the batter or a spread—Parks credits this publication for establishing the recipe in America. A description appeared of this cake the following year, when a newspaper mentioned "devil's food" as "black as only his satanic majesty can be".

A contrast with angel food cake may have been the origin of the name devil's food cake. The dessert was very popular at the time, having been published in recipes since at least 1878. In the Oxford Encyclopedia of Food and Drink in America, food writer Lesley Porcelli suggests the name may also have been inspired by the culinary use of the word "deviled" to describe rich, dark, or heavily spiced dishes. The name has inspired humorous comments; Rorer's 1902 recipe declares it to be "Fit for Angels", and another early recipe recommends topping it with divinity frosting.

=== Early 20th century ===
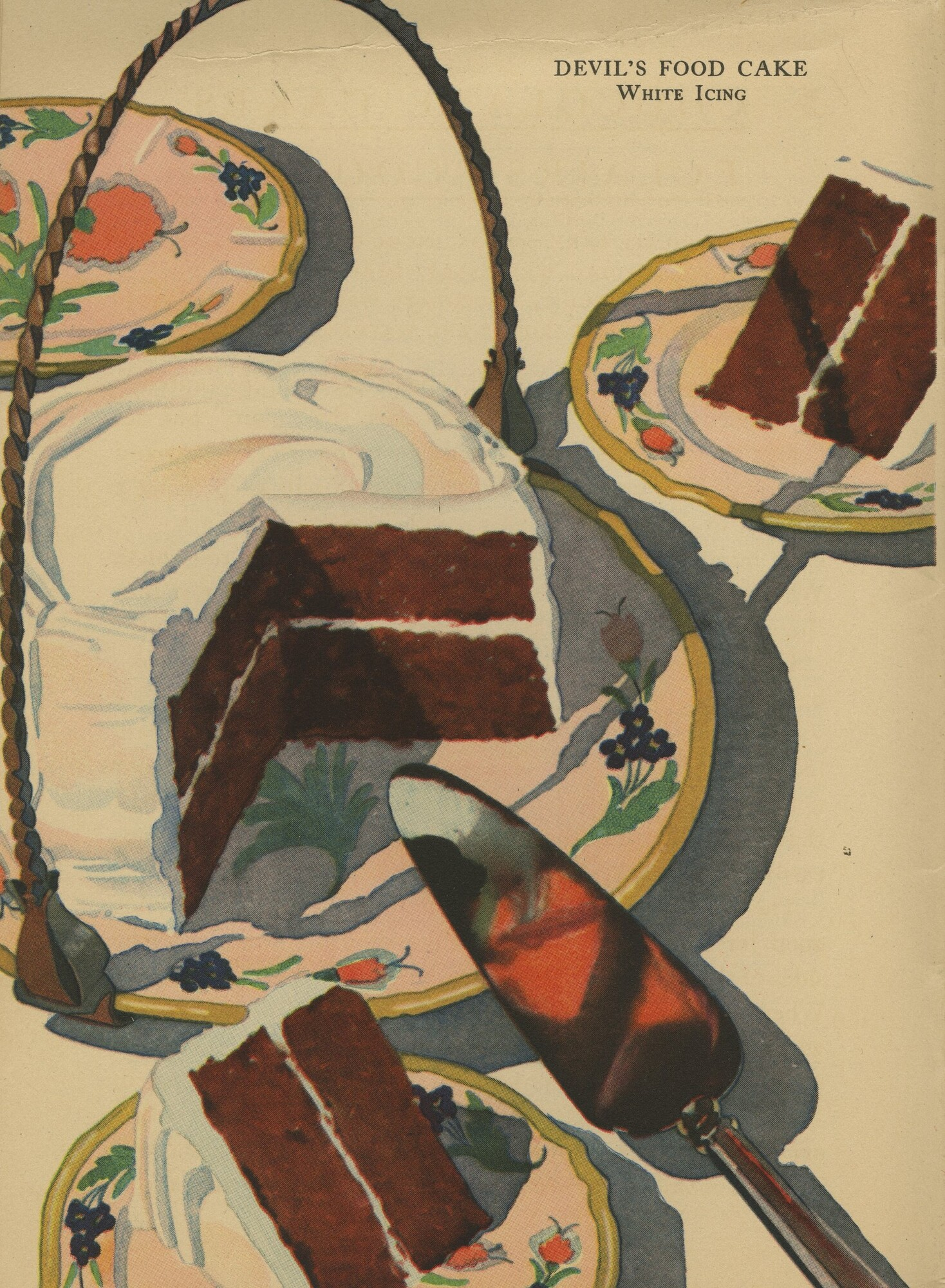
An illustration of devil's food cake from the 1928 pamphlet "Famous Recipes for Baker's Chocolate and Breakfast Cocoa."

By the beginning of the 20th century, the combination of boiled milk and chocolate had given way in many recipes to cocoa powder and buttercream. Cookbooks often printed recipes for "chocolate cake" and "devil's food cake" side by side; the devil's food cake usually differentiated by a greater proportion of chocolate. An example of this could be seen in a 1914 commercial baker's manual, which called for three ounces of cocoa for chocolate cake, but ten ounces of cocoa for a devil's food cake of a similar size. Apart from this heightened chocolate content, early 20th century recipes for devil's food cake varied widely. Recipes differed in batter preparation methods (some recipes called for making a custard of egg, milk, and chocolate, then incorporating that into creamed butter and sugar), frosting choices (boiled icing was typical, but other recipes called for buttercream or fudge icing), and in optional embellishments like nuts. During the Great Depression, cooks introduced coffee in place of the earlier hot milk, further accentuating chocolate flavor. At the same time, whole eggs were used rather than egg yolks.

By 1913, devil's food cake had achieved widespread popularity, appearing in Anna Clair Vangalder's Modern Women of America Cookbook 23 times. One variation around this time, swapping chocolate for cocoa powder and baking the cake into layers with boiled icing was published under the name "Velvet Cocoa Cake", and formed an ancestor of the modern red velvet cake. As ingredients were incorporated into this variation giving it a reddish appearance, by the mid-1920s it had acquired the name "Red Devil".

Around the 1920s, the popularity of devil's food cake brought several commercial applications. Following the success of Duff's Ginger Bread Mix in 1929, P. Duff and Sons of Pittsburgh quickly introduced devil's food among its early cake mix offerings. In 1919, the Taggart Baking Company began selling the first commercially produced cupcakes, made using a devil's food cake recipe. The cupcakes would be marketed under the Hostess brand after 1927, and later evolved into the Hostess CupCake known today. Devil's food was also the inspiration for the Devil Dog, a hot-dog shaped, cream-filled snack cake, and a precursor to the whoopie pie.

=== Mid-20th century ===
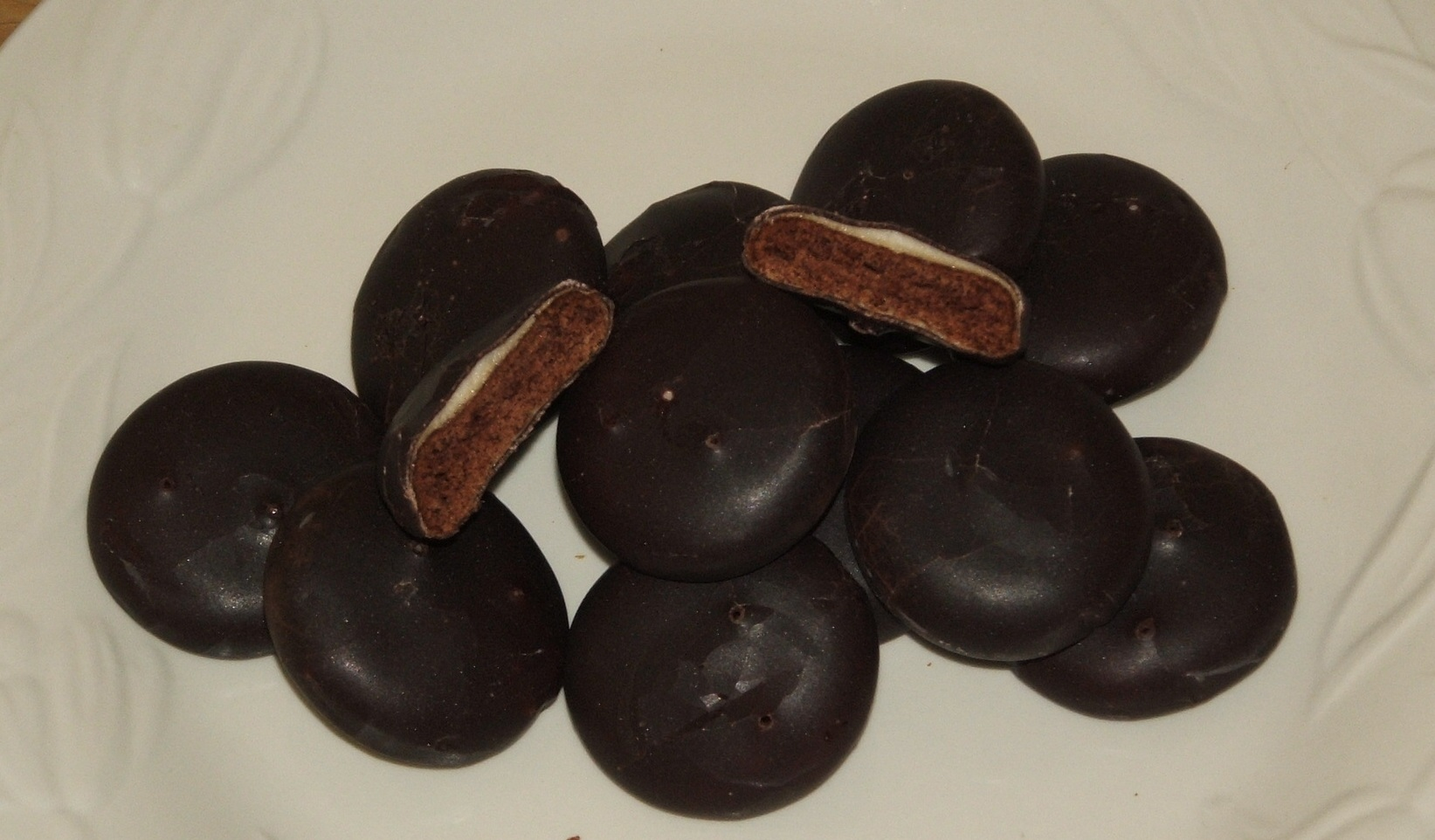
SnackWell's devil's food cake cookies

Recipes were often published in the 1950s, in many cases alongside those for red velvet cakes. By this time, names for red velvet cake had dropped reference to devils, but their proximity in publications and similar recipes generated confusion. Part of the reason so many devil's food cake recipes were being published at this time was due to a widely-believed tale, wherein a woman was charged an exorbitant fee after being granted a request for the devil's food cake recipe at the Waldorf Astoria New York. Incensed Americans hearing the story second hand often understood the story to describe a "friend-of-a-friend", and newspapers and community cookbooks were inundated with recipes for Waldorf Astoria red velvet cake. The story persisted in publications into the 1970s, and remained believed in some segments as of the 21st century.

=== Late 20th century ===
In the 1990s as many Americans perceived fat as particularly unhealthy, a devil's food, low-fat cookie range was released by SnackWell's. The cookies were immediately popular, and by 1995 the devil's food cake variety comprised a third of SnackWell's sales.

As the cake continued to evolve, by the 21st century the typical devil's food cake was a chiffon cake, lacking the butter of earlier recipes, and made distinct from other chocolate cakes by its higher chocolate content.

== See also ==
- Death by Chocolate
- List of American desserts
- List of cakes

== Sources ==
- Amendola, Joseph; Rees, Nicole (2003). Understanding Baking: The Art and Science of Baking (3rd ed.). Hoboken: Wiley. ISBN 0471405469.
- Carlin, Joseph (2015). "Hostess". The Oxford Companion to Sugar and Sweets. Oxford: Oxford University Press. ISBN 978-0-199-31339-6.
- Clarence-Smith, William Gervase (2000). Cocoa and Chocolate, 1765-1914. New York: Routledge. ISBN 978-1-134-60778-5.
- Danowski, Debbie (2024). "Happy Eating" and Food Addiction in American Advertising. London: Lexington Books. ISBN 978-1666939262.
- Fehribach, Paul (2023). Midwestern Food: A Chef's Guide to the Surprising History of a Great American Cuisine, with More Than 100 Tasty Recipes. University of Chicago Press. ISBN 978-0226819495.
- Lovegren, Sylvia (1995). Fashionable Food: Seven Decades of Food Fads. New York: Macmillan. ISBN 978-0-02-575705-9.
- Maltz, Samuel A (1 January 1992). Bakery Technology and Engineering. Springer. ISBN 978-0-442-30855-1.
- Oliver, Sandra (2015). "whoopie pie". The Oxford Companion to Sugar and Sweets. Oxford: Oxford University Press. ISBN 978-0-199-31339-6.
- Parks, Stella (2017). BraveTart: Iconic American Desserts. W. W. Norton & Company. ISBN 978-0393634273.
- Porcelli, Lesley (2013). "Devil's Food". In Smith, Andrew F. (ed.). The Oxford Encyclopedia of Food and Drink in America (2nd ed.). New York: Oxford University Press. ISBN 978-0-19-973496-2.
- Shapiro, Laura (2015). "cake mix". The Oxford Companion to Sugar and Sweets. Oxford: Oxford University Press. ISBN 978-0-199-31339-6.
