= Suzy Q (snack cake) =

Brand of snack cake

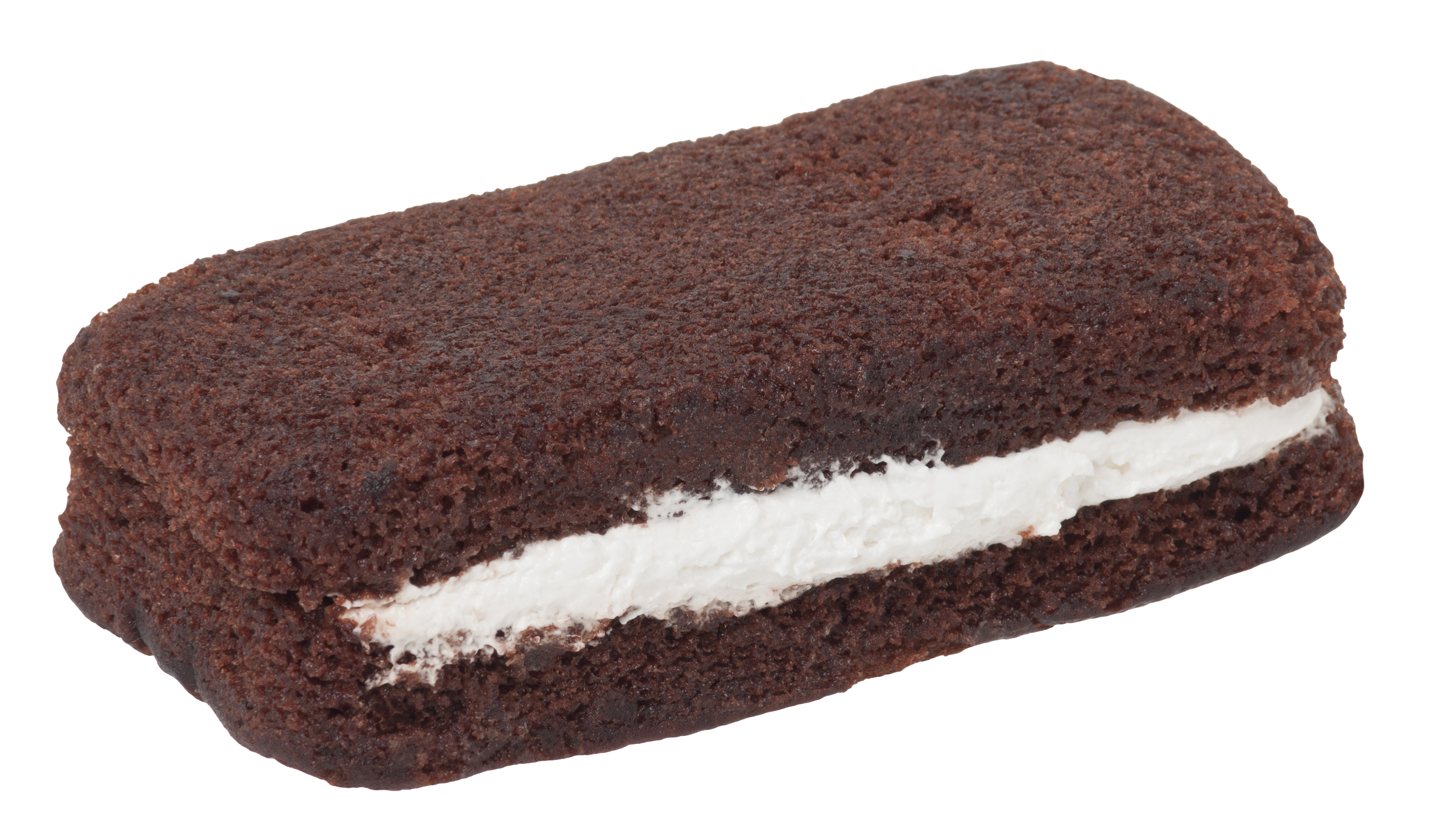
Suzy Q's

Suzy Q's are an American brand of snack cake produced and distributed by Hostess Brands similar to the Drake's Devil Dog. The oblong sandwich, of either devil's food cake or banana-flavored cake with white crème filling, was invented in 1961 and named after the daughter of Continental Baking Company President William J Sellhorn.

The cake was initially discontinued in 2012, but was reintroduced in 2015, although with a different look. However, after backlash from fans, the original cake was reintroduced in 2018. The return was short-lived, however, as Hostess Brands discontinued Suzy Q in late 2020. It later came back in September 2025.
