= Sno Balls =

American chocolate cake confection

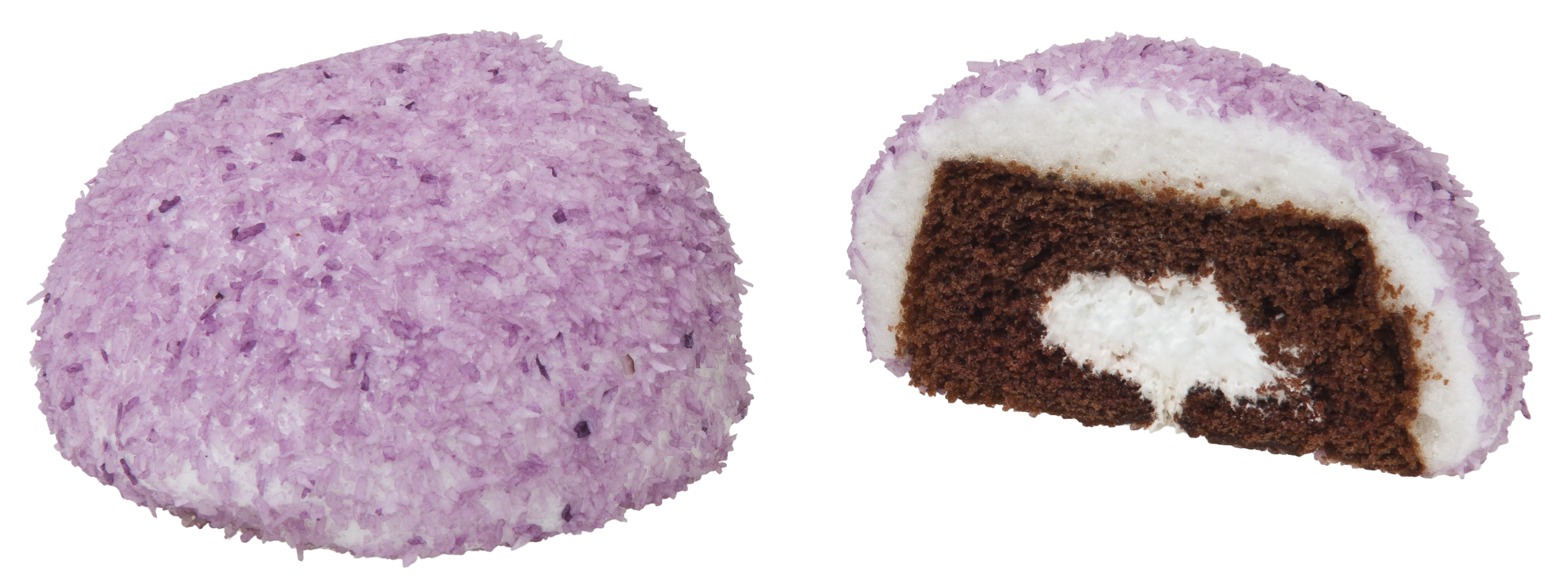
- A lavender Hostess Sno Ball
- Type: Cake
- Place of origin: United States
- Created by: Hostess
- Invented: 1947; 79 years ago
- Main ingredients: marshmallow icing, coconut flakes

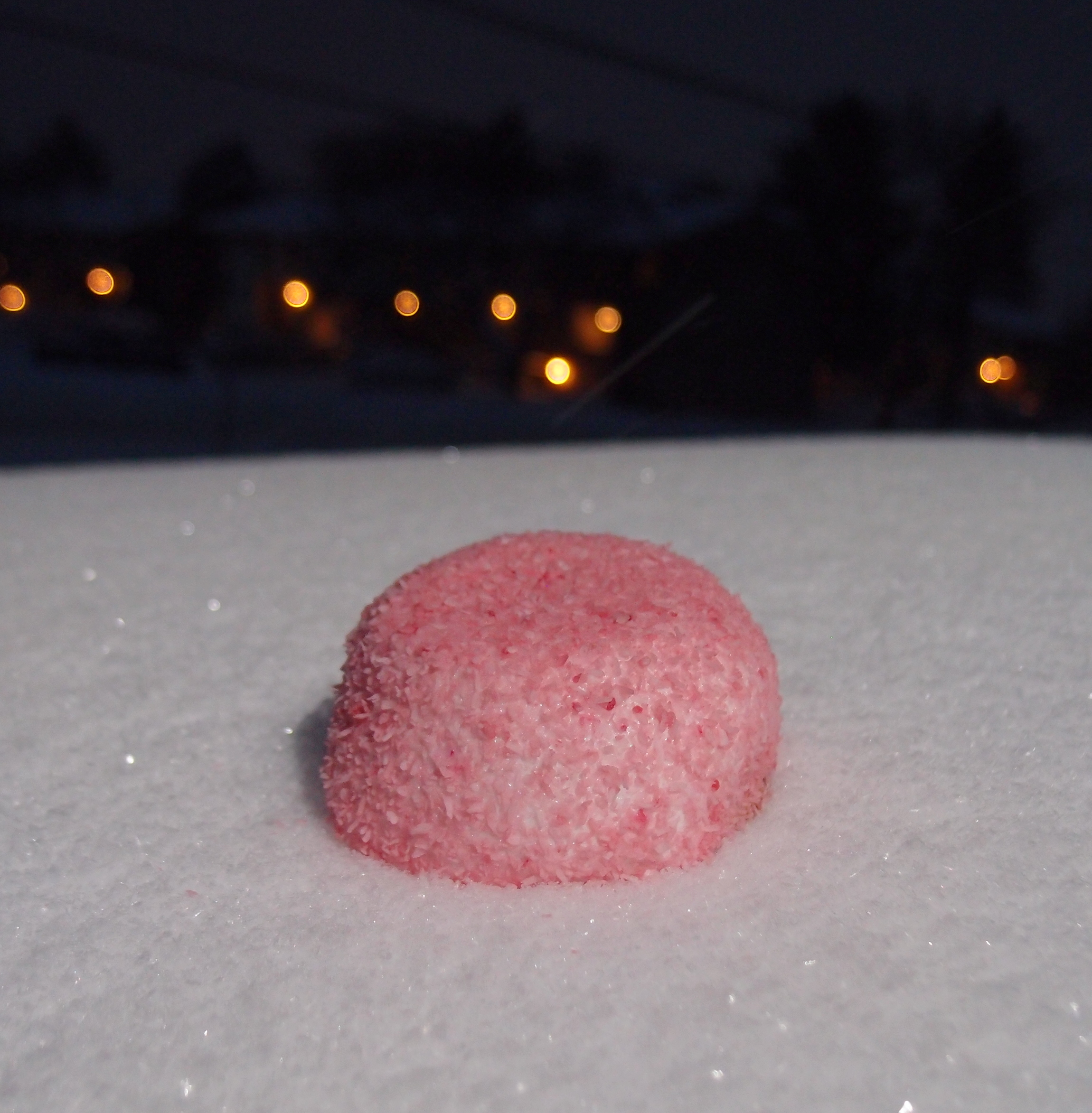
A classic pink Sno Ball.

Sno Balls are cream-filled chocolate snack cakes covered with marshmallow frosting and coconut flakes formerly produced and distributed by Hostess and currently owned by The J.M. Smucker Company. Sno Balls are usually pink; however, they are also available in chocolate, lemon, white, green, blue and other colors for specific holidays and times of year. They come in packages of two and are sold at many convenience and grocery stores in the United States.

A similar cake produced by Tunnock's, called a "Snowball", is often sold at supermarkets in the United Kingdom; these cakes are typically covered in desiccated coconut, but are typically brown rather than pink, because they have chocolate on their outside.

== History ==
Sno Balls were first introduced in 1947. Hostess attributes their initial popularity to Americans being released from the flour and sugar rationing during World War II. Originally, the cakes were colored white and lacked the crème filling. The crème filling was added in 1950. A little later the pink coloring was added to the shredded coconut in one of the two cakes in each package, but eventually the company decided that it was more efficient to have both cakes the same color, and they decided to color both cakes in each package pink.

Other colors (sometimes with their own names) besides pink are sold at particular times of the year, including:

- Green ("Lucky Puffs") – St. Patrick's Day
- Lavender ("Hoppers") – Spring
- Neon green ("Glo Balls") – Halloween
- Orange ("Glo Balls") – Halloween
- Orange ("Scary Cakes") – Halloween
- White – Winter/Christmas

== Movie and television references ==
In television and movie references, Sno Balls are often used as an emblematic "junk food," or as a means of communicating caring from one person to another.

- In the 2021 movie The Starling, Lilly Maynard, brings Sno Balls to her husband, Jack. He mentions that his mother always packed Sno Balls in his lunch. Also, she is seen several times perfecting the Sno Ball display in the grocery store where she works.
- In the 1990 movie Catchfire, Jodie Foster plays a character, Anne Benton, who is obsessed with Sno Balls, so the character Milo, played by Dennis Hopper, surprises her one morning by covering the bed with dozens of pink Sno Balls.
- In the 1997 movie Con Air, the protagonist, Cameron Poe narrates a letter to his wife, in which he says: "I got your package. Those pink coconut things have made me quite popular. Met a guy just the other day - Baby-O. He sure does love 'em." The video shows a package of Hostess Sno Balls in the care package she sent him, and a few seconds later, a pink Sno Ball being passed through prison bars from one inmate to another.
- In the 1997 episode "Homer's Phobia" of The Simpsons, Homer thinks Bart is gay because he choose a Sno-Ball over a cupcake for dessert.
- In the 1999 film The Straight Story, Dorothy is seen sunbathing and eating a Sno Ball.
- In the X-Files episode "Tempus Fugit", Fox Mulder and Dana Scully are eating at a restaurant; Mulder has arranged for the restaurant staff to sing "Happy Birthday To You" to Scully while delivering a pink Sno Ball with a sparkler on it to her at their table.
- The sitcom iCarly regularly makes references to "Fat Cakes" (Season 4, Episode 24 "iToe Fat Cakes") which directly parody Hostess Sno Balls.
- In the sitcom Cheers season 9, episode 25, "Rat Girl", Woody Boyd announces that "Sno Balls are better because they're bite-sized" and proceeds to stuff the entire cake into his mouth.
- In Gilmore Girls season 4, episode 9 ("Ted Koppel's Big Night Out"), Lorelai Gilmore and Jason Stiles go on a date at a grocery store. Jason says he was curious about Sno Balls and had never tried them before. He says: "You wouldn't be curious about pink marshmallow coconut balls? Who makes these? How did the decision to dye the coconut pink occur? Why are they shaped like a chest? Is there any dessert on the face of the planet that could stimulate this much debate?” A few seconds later, Jason asks Lorelai: “Watch my Sno Balls please,” to which she responds: “Not on the first date, Mister.”
- In the movie Hurlyburly (1998), the character Mickey finds and brings up some Sno Balls, as a healthier alternative to the Bolivian cocaine breakfast, which Eddie and Phil are having.
- In the movie Zombieland, the character Tallahassee is a fan of Twinkies, but not Sno Balls. When Tallahassee and Columbus happen upon a Hostess truck run off the road, they open the back of the truck in search of a Twinkie for Tallahassee. When they open the truck, packages of Sno Balls tumble out the truck's doors.
- In The Hot Chick, Jessica tells her friend April that she is a "binger" for eating a Sno Ball and that "this is going to go straight to your ass." Jessica then takes a bite out of April's Sno Ball. Later, when Jessica finds herself in a man's body, Jessica and April meet in an empty stadium, where April is sitting on the bleachers eating a Sno Ball.
- In season 1 episode 8 ("Blood Brother") of Roswell (TV series), Alex, played by Colin Hanks, is eating a Sno Ball at one of the school's lunch tables. FBI agent (undercover as the school's guidance counselor) Kathleen Topolsky, played by Julie Benz, approaches Alex and attempts to build rapport by commenting on the snack. Topolsky says, "I used to peel the marshmallow off, so I could get straight to the cupcake inside" before dosing Alex's drink with a substance.
- In Veronica Mars (season 1 episode 17), Veronica (Kristen Bell) brings groceries to a young college student hiding at a hotel (played by Erin Chambers), with a package of Sno Balls visible in the grocery bag. Veronica says that she brought "brain food," presumably to help Chambers' character study for her college coursework. Upon seeing the contents of the grocery bag, Chambers' character exclaims, "Sno Balls!"
- In The Spirit of '76, a Sno Ball is offered by Tommy Sears (Steven Shane McDonald) to Adam-11 (David Cassidy).

== See also ==
- Snowball
