= Nafziger =

Nafziger is a surname. Notable people with the surname include:

- Dana Nafziger (born 1953), American football player
- George Nafziger (born 1949), American writer and editor
- Ralph Leroy Nafziger (1887–1965), American businessman
- Rudolf Nafziger (1945–2008), German footballer

The surname Nafziger has German roots, many translations being close to “one who naps”. It is uncertain if these translations are fully correct however, as the surname is from the Middle Ages, and could have been used humorously. Today, the most people with this surname live in the USA or Canada, but there are others in countries such as France, and Germany.
