= Dolly Madison =

Snack food brand

Dolly Madison Bakery
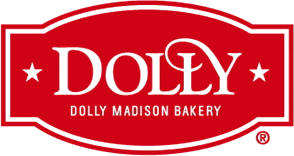
- Product type: Snack cakes
- Current owner: Hostess Brands
- Country: United States
- Markets: North America
- Products: Zingers, Fruit and Chocolate and Vanilla Pies, Pecan Twirls

Dolly Madison is an American bakery brand owned by Hostess Brands, selling packaged baked snack foods. It is best known for its long marketing association with the Peanuts animated TV specials.

== History ==
In 1937, Ralph Leroy Nafziger started a snack cake brand in Georgia called Dolly Madison. The name was inspired by first lady Dolley Madison, who was known for her elegant parties, but with a different spelling of her first name. The brand's slogan was "Cakes and pastries fine enough to serve at the White House." A Dolly Madison Bakery appears in the 1932 movie Officer 13 and was named after Dolley Madison, the wife of President James Madison. The name was also used for a successful ice cream brand sold for decades in the United States in the mid-twentieth century, with a logo featuring a silhouette of Dolley Madison.

The snack cake brand was among the products liquidated by Hostess when it announced plans to cease business on November 16, 2012. When Apollo Global Management acquired Hostess Brands' Twinkies in January 2013, they also acquired the rights to the Dolly Madison snack cake brands, as well as the official corporate names of Hostess Brands and Dolly Madison, with plans to resume production of the products.

== Marketing ==
In marketing, Dolly Madison snacks are probably best remembered for their long association with characters from Charles M. Schulz's Peanuts comic strip. Charlie Brown and his friends appeared on Dolly Madison packages and in television commercials in the 1960s, 1970s and 1980s. The bakery, along with Coca-Cola and McDonald's, was a major sponsor of the Peanuts animated specials telecast on CBS during that period. Each pie flavor was sold with a different character on the wrapper, including:

Charlie Brown – cherry and banana crème
Linus van Pelt – apple
Lucy van Pelt – lemon
Schroeder – berry
Sally Brown – coconut crème and pineapple
Frieda – chocolate
Peppermint Patty – strawberry and peach
Marcie – Boysenberry

The wrappers were later redesigned and featured Snoopy on all the flavors. Charlie Brown was also on Zingers packages wearing a baseball cap. Snoopy and Linus were also on Gems donut packages as well.

Original Dolly Madison logo, used from 1969 to the mid-1980s.

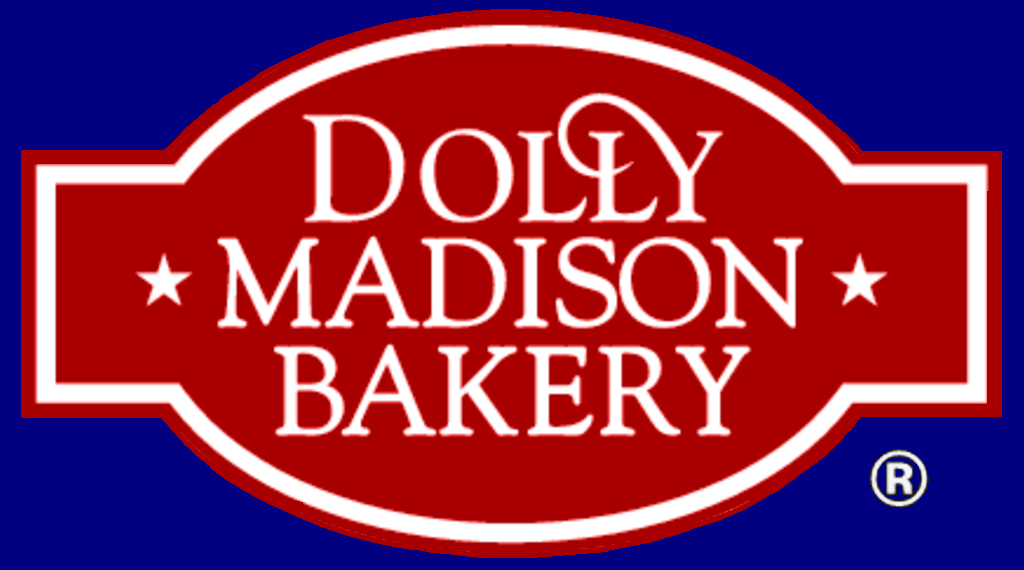
Original Dolly Madison outlet bakery store logo, used from mid 1980s through November 2012

During the period when the packages featured Peanuts characters, the advertising agency for Dolly Madison products was Dancer Fitzgerald Sample's San Francisco branch—primarily due to its proximity to Schulz (based in nearby Santa Rosa).

== Products ==
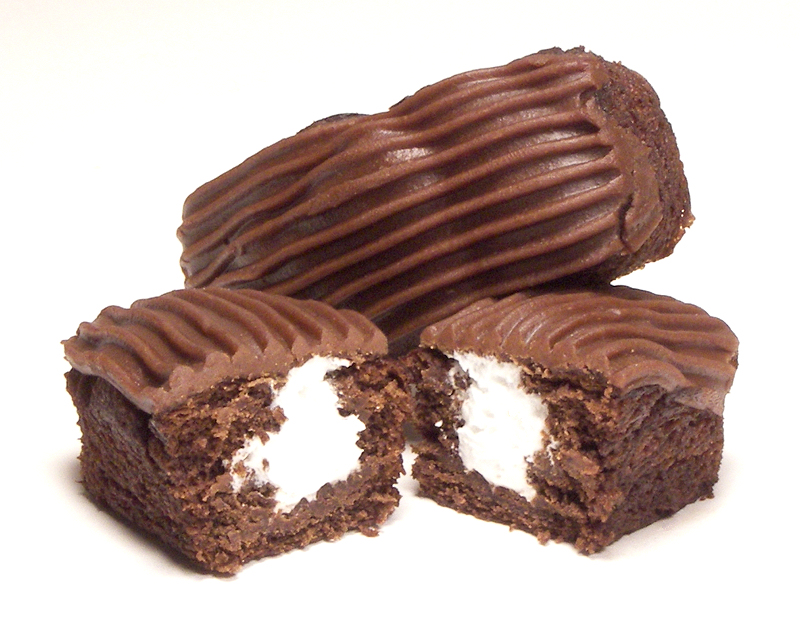
Dolly Madison chocolate Zingers

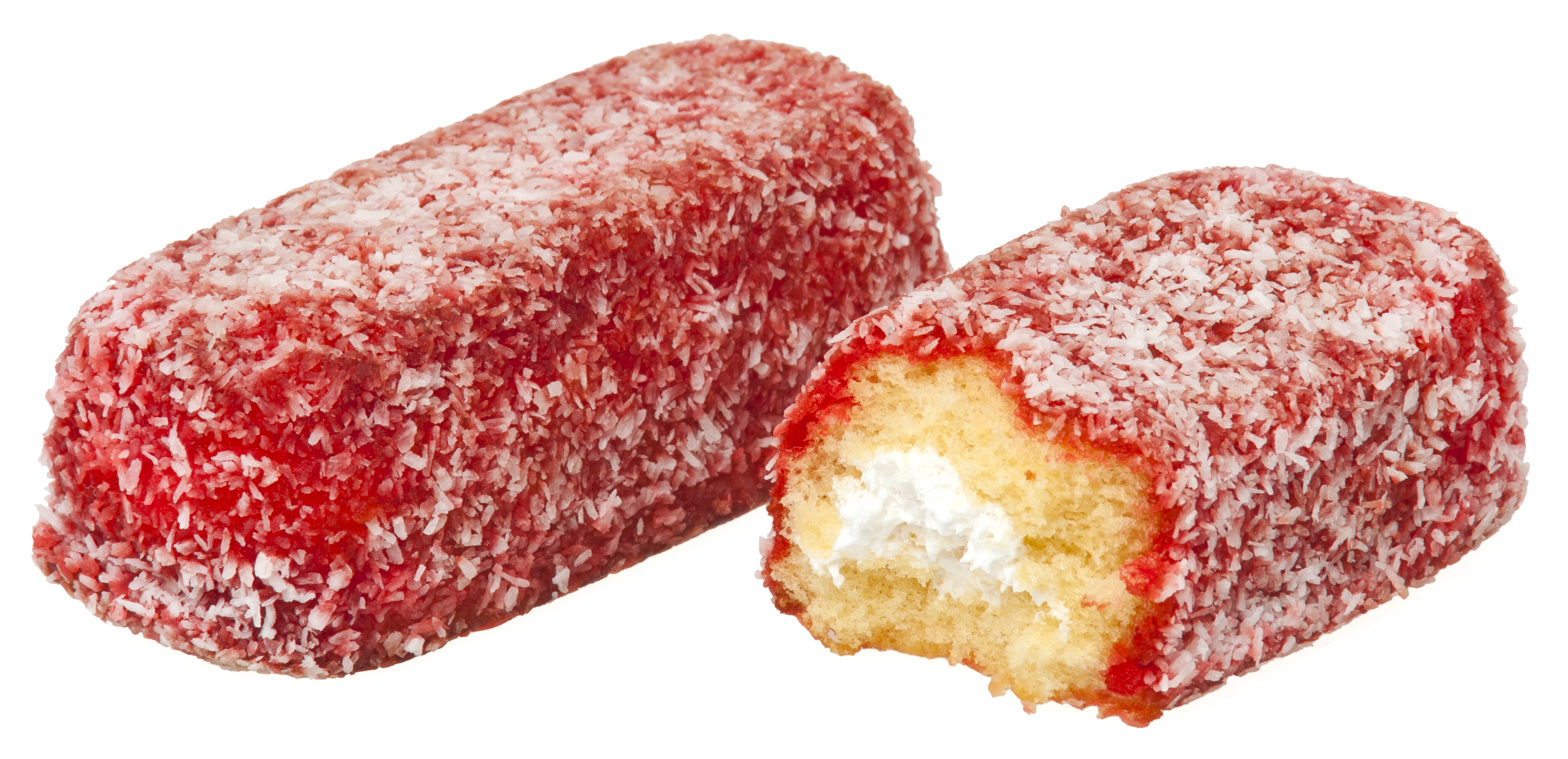
Dolly Madison raspberry Zingers

== See also ==
- Snack cake
- Zingers
