= James Dewar (baker) =

Canadian inventor (1897–1985)

- Born: James Alexander Dewar; February 5, 1897; Pugwash, Nova Scotia, Canada
- Died: June 30, 1985 (aged 88); Downers Grove, Illinois, U.S.
- Other name: Mr. Twinkie
- Occupation: Executive
- Years active: 1920–1972
- Employer: Hostess Brands
- Known for: Twinkies
- Notable work: Invention of the Twinkie
- Spouse: Sylvia D. Dewar
- Children: 4 (including Jim Dewar)

James Alexander Dewar (February 5, 1897 – June 30, 1985) was a Canadian inventor known for inventing the Twinkie in 1930.

== Career ==
Dewar began his career in 1920 at the Continental Baking Company that later, through a series of mergers and acquisitions, became Hostess Brands. He started as a delivery boy by delivering pastries by horse-drawn cart. Dewar eventually rose up through the ranks to be a plant manager.

In 1930, Dewar's plant was making strawberry shortcakes, but only during strawberry season. Dewar came up with an idea to create a shortcake with cream on the inside instead of strawberries. Having seen a billboard for a shoe company called the "Twinkle Toe Shoe Co.", he was inspired to call his shortcake invention a "Twinkie".

Dewar rose to be regional vice-president at Hostess and held that position until 1972.

== Personal life ==
James Dewar was born on February 5, 1897, in Pugwash River, Nova Scotia. As a young man, Dewar worked on boats shipping timber and limestone, arriving in Chicago on a laker.

Dewar had 4 kids with one of them being Cleveland Browns half-back James Dewar Jr. Dewar had a total of 15 grandchildren as well. Dewar also said he would give his kids and grandchildren Twinkies regularly, though he said that it never affected any of their health. Some people said that Dewar had at least 3 twinkies and a glass of milk before he went to bed though that was never confirmed nor denied by Dewar.

Dewar died on June 30, 1985, in Downers Grove, Illinois, at the age of 88.
