= Voortman Cookies =

Canadian cookie company

Voortman Cookies Limited
- Type: Subsidiary
- Industry: Food
- Genre: Baked goods
- Founded: 1951; 75 years ago
- Founders: William and Harry Voortman
- Headquarters: 43°22′49.4″N 79°46′33.6″W, Burlington, Ontario, Canada
- Area served: Worldwide through: • Burlington retail location; • Other retailers; • Online
- Products: Cookies: • coconut; • windmill; • turnover; Wafers: • vanilla; • key lime; • strawberry; • peanut butter; • maple; • chocolate
- Parent: Second Nature Brands
- Website: www.voortman.com/en

Voortman Cookies Limited is a Canadian company specializing in the production and sale of cookies. Based in Burlington, Ontario, Voortman brand cookies are sold at retail locations across Canada, the United States (including Puerto Rico), and over 70 other countries worldwide.

Orrville, Ohio-based Smucker acquired Voortman in 2023 as part of its US$5.6-billion takeover of Hostess Brands. Hostess had purchased Voortman in 2019 from private equity company Swander Place Capital for US$320-million in cash, meaning the cookie maker has lost some value over the past five years. On Oct 22, 2024 Smucker sold Voortman to Michigan's Second Nature Brands for US$305-million.

== History ==
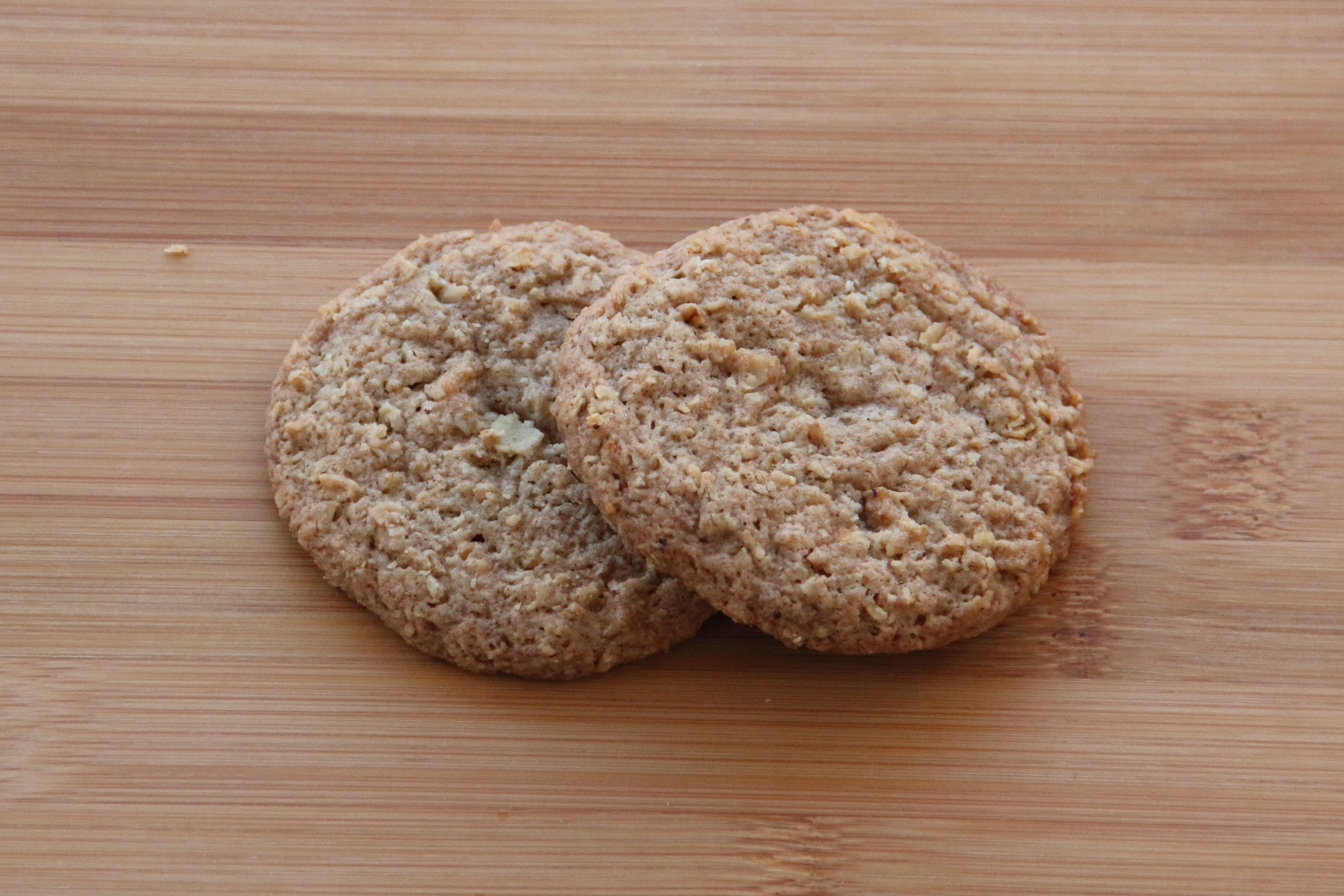
Voortman Bakery oatmeal cookies

Voortman Cookies Limited was founded in 1951 by Dutch immigrant brothers William and Harry Voortman. In the 2010s, Voortman Cookies makes over 60 varieties of cookies, including lines of creme wafers, sugar free and seasonal products. The Burlington plant remains the sole production facility, where over 200 full-time workers are employed. Voortman's cookies are distributed throughout North America by a network of over 500 independent distributors. In 2015, Voortman's sales were over $100 million.

In 2015, a majority stake in Voortman Cookies was acquired by private equity firm Swander Pace Capital. At that time, chief executive officer Harry Voortman stepped away from daily management but remains on the board of directors.

In 2017, Voortman went through a complete rebranding, which included removal from its formulae all artificial colours, artificial flavours, and high-fructose corn syrup.

On December 2, 2019, Hostess Brands announced that it was purchasing Voortman from Swander Pace Capital for approximately US$320 million; this transaction was completed a month later. Subsequently, The J.M. Smucker Company acquired Hostess Brands.

In October 2024, The J.M. Smucker Co. agreed to sell Voortman to Second Nature Brands in a $305 million all-cash deal. In December, it was announced that the purchase had been completed.

== Trans fat ban ==
In 2003, Voortman Cookies announced that no trans fats would be used in the production of its cookies. This made Voortman Cookies the first Canadian food company and one of the first in North America to abolish the use of trans-fats in retail food products.
