= Chocodile Twinkie =

Confection created by the Hostess Brands company

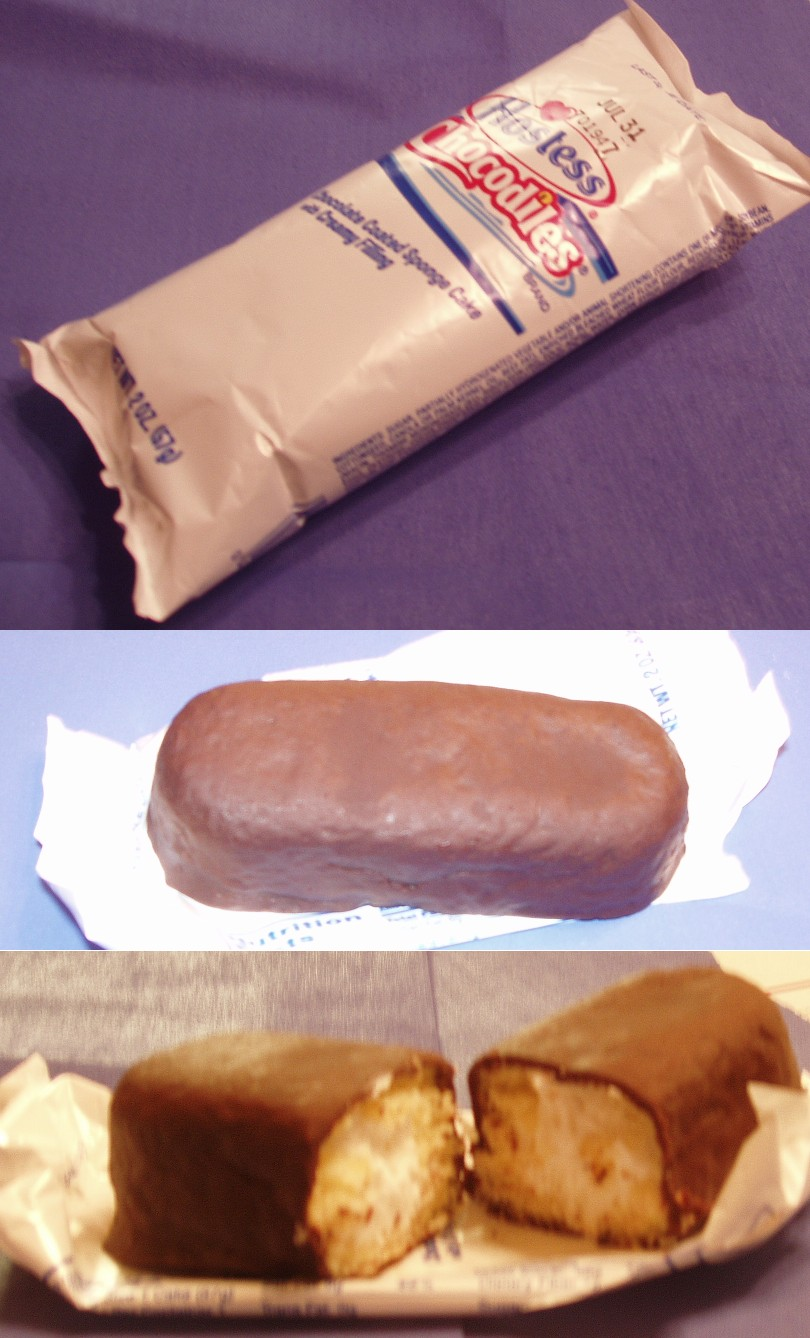
A Chocodile

Chocodile Twinkies /ˈtʃɒkoʊdaɪl/ are a confection created by the Hostess Brands company. The confection was known only as Chocodiles prior to 2014. The package describes the snack cake as a "chocolate coated sponge cake with creamy filling." The Chocodile is Twinkie-shaped and sold in packages of two.

== History ==
The Chocodiles mascot was formerly Chauncey Chocodile (voice needs citation), but Hostess has removed him from packaging and their website in recent years. Since the late 1990s, Chocodiles have no longer been sold on the East Coast of the United States. Hostess had only a few West Coast factories making them, and to ensure the products' freshness, Chocodiles were sold only on the West Coast.

There has been debate over whether a Chocodile is a chocolate-covered Twinkie. The debate arose from the seeming "texture difference" between the Twinkie and the Chocodile. During a taste test and debate in Vacaville, California, opinions were split among those taking the test as to whether the taste of the cake was the same. This issue was resolved during an episode of Unwrapped—a Food Network television show—where it was confirmed by a Hostess employee named Jim Duffy that the Chocodile was, in fact, a chocolate-covered Twinkie.

This has caused consternation for some, who continue to swear the cake is different. In actuality, it is the chocolate that makes the difference. Due to the chocolate coating, the cake tends to stay more moist, leading to the slightly different texture when compared to a normal Twinkie.

In 2014, Hostess Brands re-introduced the cake as "Chocodile Twinkies". The new cakes are 1.45 oz. each, and are labelled as "Fun Size", as the original Chocodiles were 2 oz. each. They are also now available on the East Coast.

In 2017, Hostess re-introduced the full sized Chocodiles as "Fudge Covered Twinkies".

== In popular culture ==
In the 1987 comedy film Summer School, teacher Freddy Shoop (Mark Harmon) bonds with a fellow teacher (Kirstie Alley) with a junk food binge; at one point, Alley declines another snack cake, stating she'll stick with the Chocodiles.

In the critically acclaimed drama film Boyz n the Hood (1991), the character Ricky Baker (Morris Chestnut) can be seen eating Chocodiles throughout various parts of the film.

On the album Irresistible Bliss by the band Soul Coughing, there is a song called “Disseminated” that features the lyric "Call up bop and I'm bunting stomach/Koko mop, I stop nothing plummet/One on top, if I ate the chocodile".

In Angel season 4, episode 7, "Apocalypse, Nowish", Chocodiles are Cordelia Chase's favorite snack food.

In television series That '70s Show season 3 episode 11, Fez, Hyde, and Kelso are laying on the ground staring at the sky. Leo, played by Tommy Chong, lays down next to Hyde and joins them. Leo asks Hyde "Chocodile?" before handing the character a Chocodile. Kelso, staring into the sky looking for UFOs, points at the sky and says "What’s that?" Leo replies "It's a Twinkie covered in chocolate, man."

In episode 689 of The Lanalax Corporation podcast, "Oops, Daddy", Chocodiles play a major role in the plot, leading the C-list celebrity protagonist to discover a time vortex in the stockroom of a grocery store.

In the TV series American Dad!, it is Roger the alien's favorite snack food. Chocodiles are sold on the West Coast and in a few areas on the East Coast: Alexandria, VA, Washington, D.C., and Philadelphia, PA. The series takes place in the state of Virginia.

In Lie to Me season 1, episode 12, "Blinded", Cal Lightman makes a deal with the serial rapist Andrew Jenkins by promising him a box of Chocodiles every week in exchange for information leading to a copycat killer.

Chocodiles are a recurring product in the web comic Modest Medusa.

On episode 15 of season 3 of Psych, "psychic" detective Shawn Spencer informs Detective Juliet O'Hara that he thinks he spotted some Chocodiles in the fridge of the cabin they are currently in, to which she responds that the offer is tempting.

In season 1, episode 7 of Timeless ("Stranded"), Lucy, Wyatt, and Rufus are captured by the Shawnee tribe led by Nonhelema during the French and Indian War. While in captivity and contemplating whether they would survive, Rufus says he would give anything for another Chocodile. After the team successfully returns to the present, Lucy gifts Rufus a whole box of Chocodiles.

== See also ==
- Gansito
