= Captain Cupcake =

- Voiced by: Allen Swift

In-universe information
- Species: Hostess CupCake

Captain Cupcake was the second mascot for Hostess brand baked goods along with Twinkie the Kid. He was portrayed as an anthropomorphic cupcake which wore a navy blue hat and gave the appearance of being the captain of a ship.

== Description ==
At the character's introduction, he was included on boxes and packages of Hostess Cupcakes but is very rarely seen on the cupcake containers anymore. Captain Cupcake appeared in one animated TV commercial for Hostess when he and two children were trapped in a villain's dungeon but were rescued by Twinkie the Kid. He was voiced by Allen Swift.

== Legacy ==
On 11 AM (PST), September 18, 2019 Funko released Captain Cupcake as their 66th Funko Pop! in the Ad Icons line of figures exclusively on the Funko website. There was also a Platinum version of the figure released.

== See also ==
- Fruit Pie the Magician
