= Zingers =

Snack cake

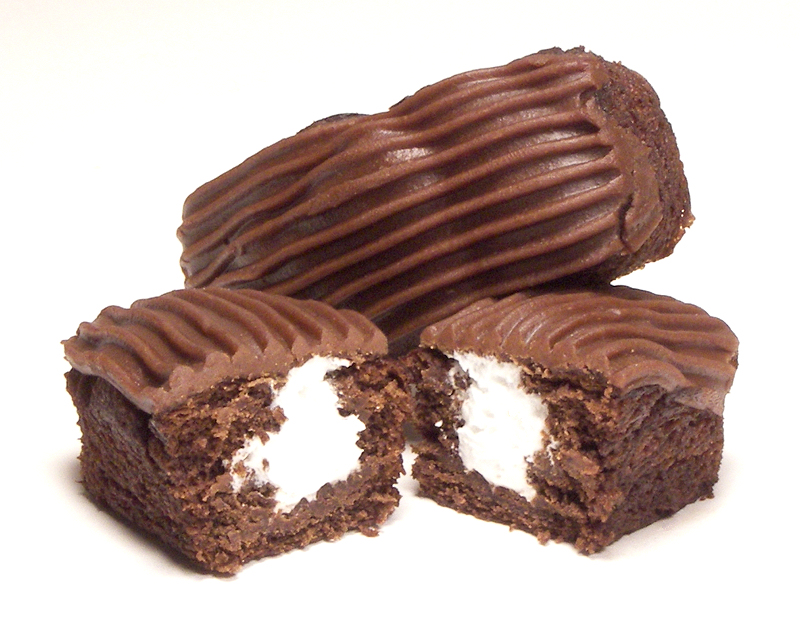
- Chocolate Zingers
- Type: Snack cake
- Place of origin: United States
- Main ingredients: Sugar, corn syrup
- Food energy (per serving): 140 kcal (590 kJ)

Zingers is a snack cake produced and sold by Dolly Madison and Hostess, snack food brands owned by Hostess Brands.

== Product line ==
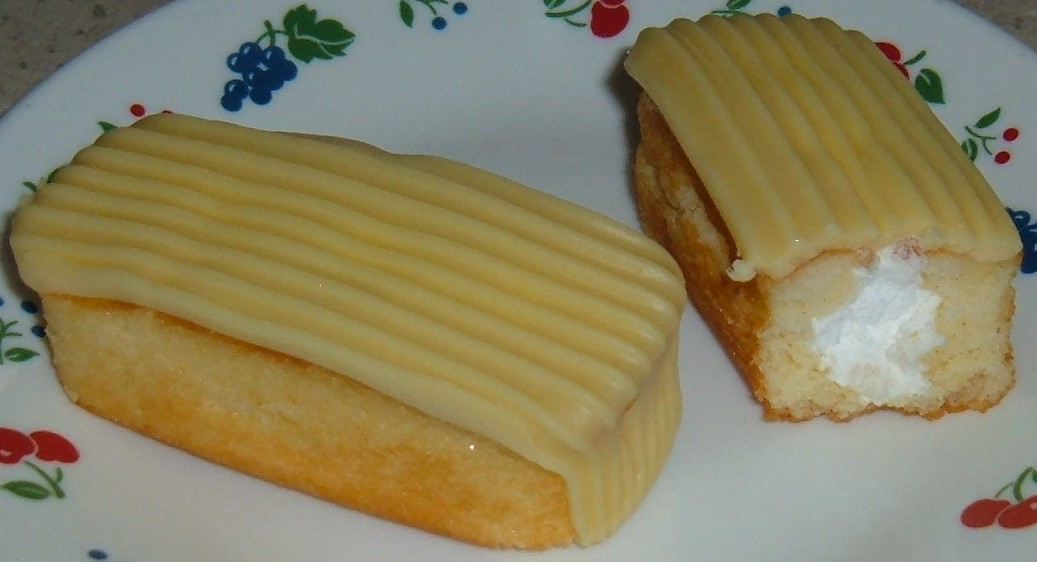
Vanilla Zingers

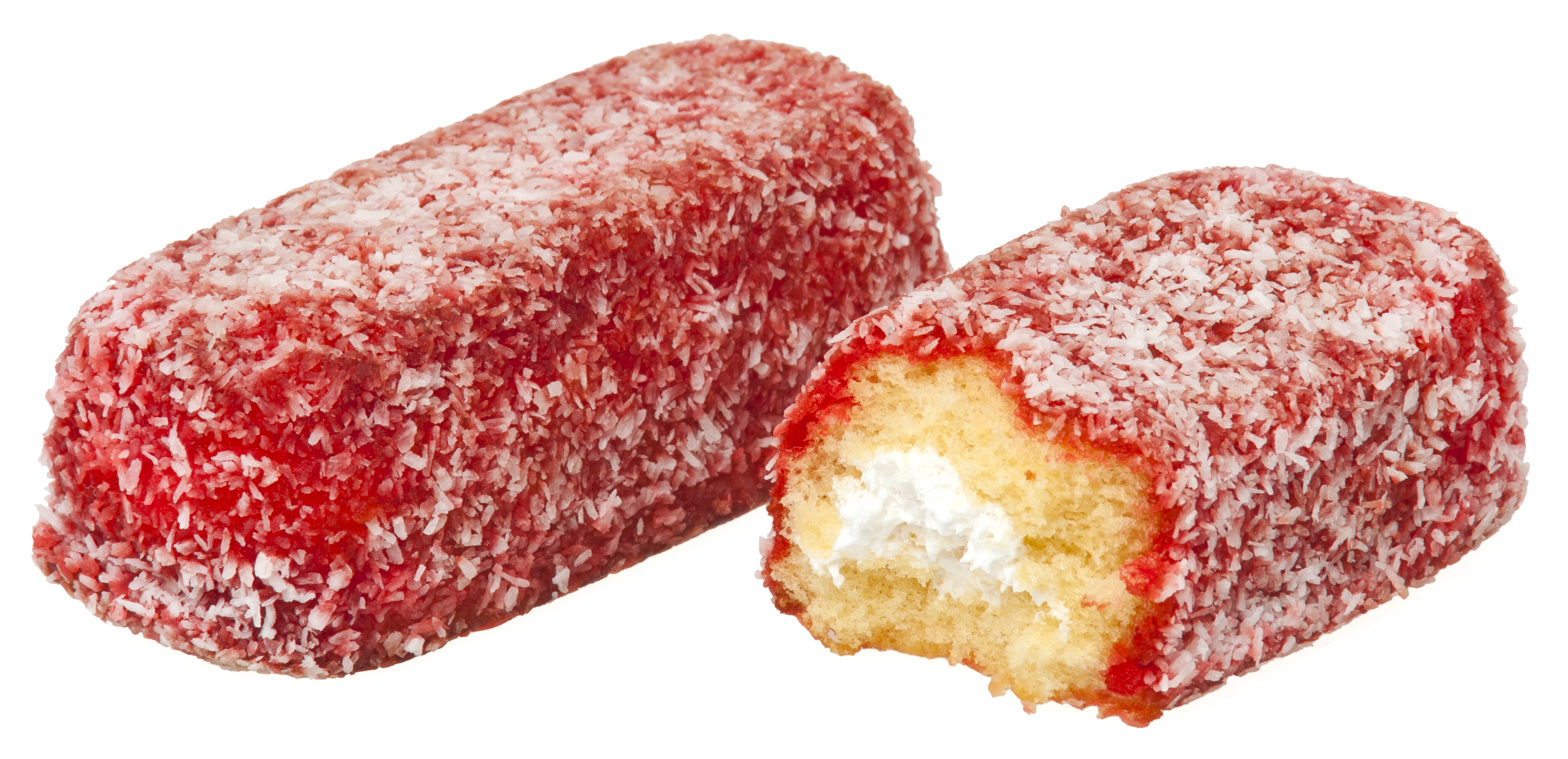
Raspberry Zingers

Zingers come in chocolate, vanilla, and raspberry flavors.

Chocolate and vanilla Zingers have a thick layer of icing on top with creamy non-dairy filling in the middle. Raspberry Zingers do not have icing on top but are instead covered in a mixture of shaved coconut and raspberry flavored syrup.

== Marketing ==
A series of commercials for Zingers used the Peanuts characters, with Snoopy playing the part of the mysterious "Zinger Zapper".

== History ==
Zingers are mentioned in grocery store newspaper ads as early as August and September 1968.
