= Ralph Leroy Nafziger =

American businessman (1887–1965)

- Born: Ralph Leroy Nafziger; November 17, 1887; Kansas City, Missouri, U.S.
- Died: September 17, 1965 (aged 77); Los Angeles, California, U.S.
- Other name: Roy Nafziger
- Education: Rensselaer Polytechnic Institute
- Occupation: Entrepreneur
- Known for: Founder of the Interstate Bakeries Corporation
- Spouse(s): Nathalie Schaefer (divorced), Vee M. Bear (divorced)
- Children: 2

Ralph Leroy "Roy" Nafziger (November 17, 1887 – September 17, 1965) was an American businessman who was the founder of the Interstate Bakeries Corporation, which eventually became Hostess Brands.

== Early life ==
Nafziger was born into a family of bakers on November 17, 1887, in Kansas City, Missouri.

He was studying Engineering and Architecture at Rensselaer Polytechnic Institute when he was called home to assist with untangling the business affairs of his father, Edward Nafziger, who could not pay a chattel mortgage he had taken with a wholesale grocery company.

== Career ==
Ralph Nafziger started selling bread on a route serviced by a horse and converted milk wagon. He would hire a worker to take over the route, build another one, and then repeat the process.

Nafziger set up a second bakery in the basement of a burned out Christian church at 6th and Prospect Avenue in the Kansas City's Northeast Neighborhood. After initial success, Nafziger's Baking expanded and, in 1925, he merged his 10 baking plants with Purity Bakers. Nafziger’s architectural training allowed him to design some of his own plants. In 1927, Nafziger bought a controlling interest in Schulze Baking.

In 1930, Nafziger announced a merger between his Schulze Baking company and seven baking companies on the west coast of the United States. The new company was called the Interstate Bakeries Corporation. Baked goods were sold under the Hostess brand. In 1937, Nafziger started a snack cake brand in Georgia called Dolly Madison, The name was inspired by first lady Dolley Madison known for elegant parties. The brand's slogan was "Cakes and pastries fine enough to serve at the White House".

== Personal life ==
Nafziger was married to Nathalie Schaefer, and was later divorced. His second marriage to Vee M. Bear lasted from April 9, 1949 until June 17, 1958. He had two children: Ralph Leroy Nafziger, Jr. and Nathalie Nafziger. Nafziger died on September 17, 1965, in Los Angeles, California, at the age of 77. The Interstate Bakeries Corporation continued growing; in 1995, it acquired Continental Baking Company (owners of the Wonder Bread and Hostess product lines) and in 2009 became Hostess Brands.
