= Gansito =

Mexican snack cake

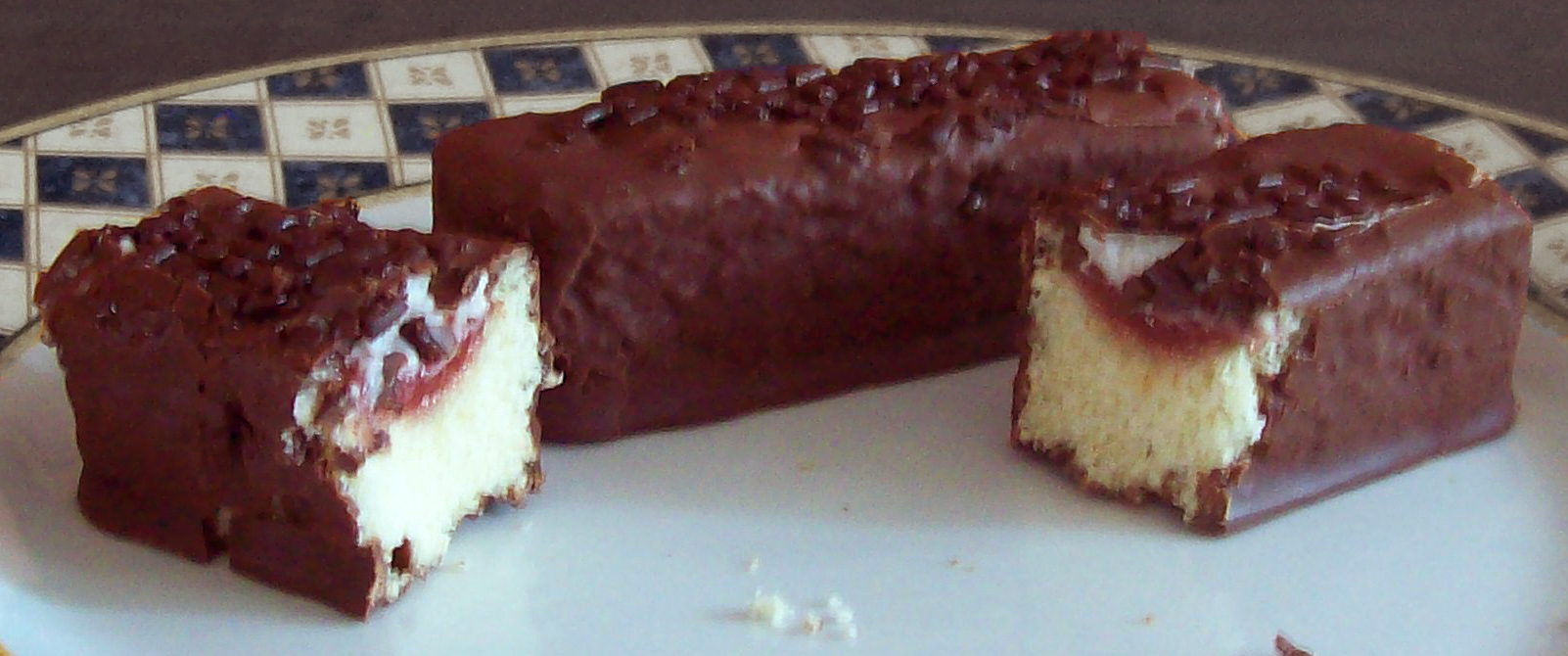
- Part of a Gansito
- Type: Snack cake
- Course: Dessert
- Place of origin: Mexico
- Region or state: Mexico City, Mexico
- Created by: Alfonso Velasco
- Invented: 1957; 69 years ago
- Main ingredients: Cream, sprinkles, strawberry-flavored jelly, sponge cake, chocolate-flavored coating
- Variations: Double chocolate
- Food energy (per 52 g serving): 210 kcal (880 kJ)
Nutritional value
(per 52 g serving)
- Protein: 2 g
- Fat: 9 g
- Carbohydrate: 30 g

A Gansito (literally "little goose", from the Spanish diminutive of ganso, "goose") is a Mexican snack cake, described as "a strawberry-flavored jelly and crème-filled cake with chocolate-flavored coating." It is made and distributed by the Marinela Brand, which is owned by Grupo Bimbo. Gansito is also available in the U.S., Colombia, Peru, and many countries in Latin America, as well as having a limited presence in Europe. In 2019 in the U.S., 5.46 million Americans ate Gansito 1-3 times a month, with 1.24 million eating 4-7 in a month, and 1.31 eating 8 or more in a month.

== History ==
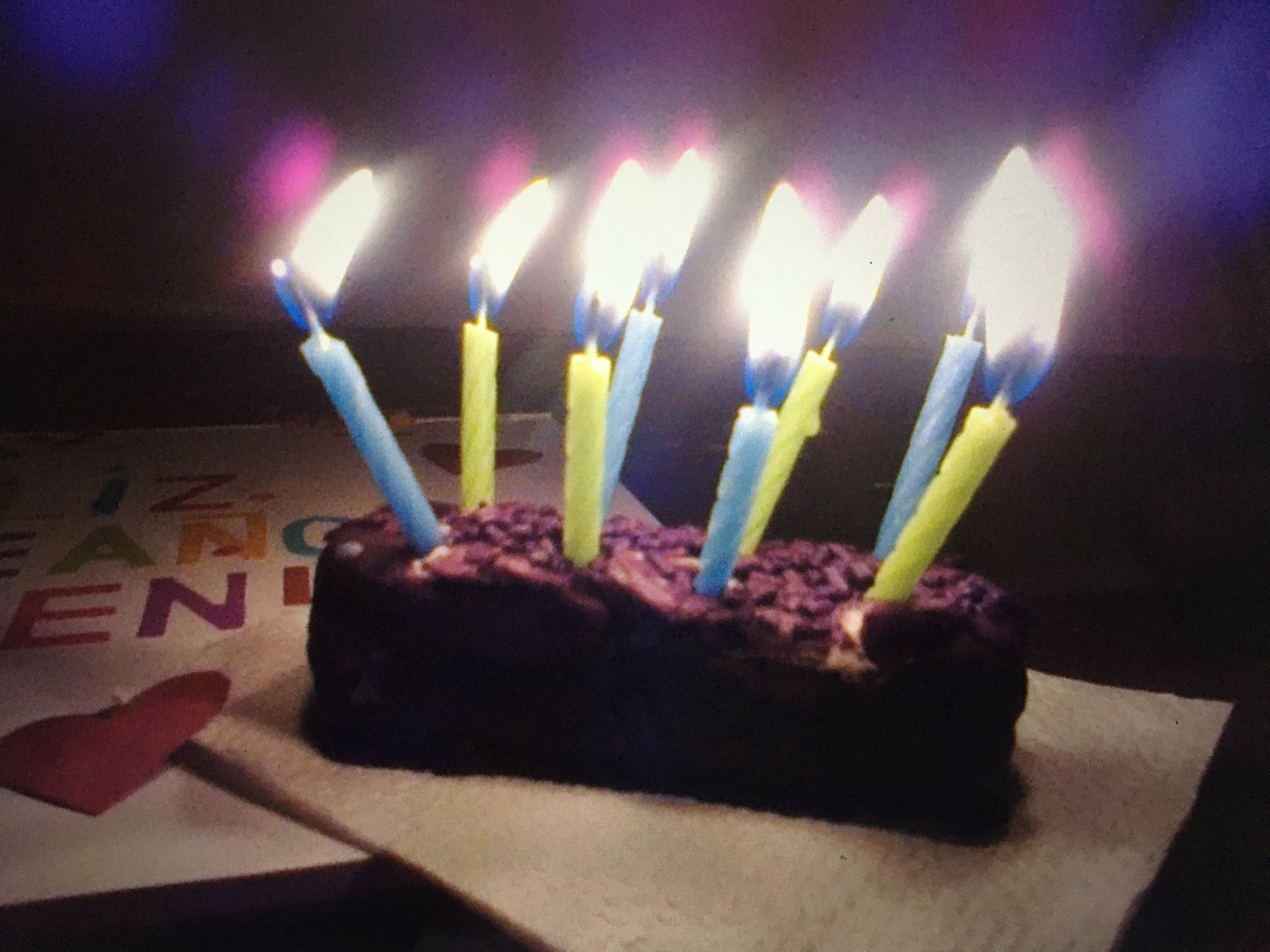
Gansito birthday cake

Gansito was invented in Mexico City, Mexico in 1957 at the Marinela factory. Alfonso Velasco invented the original recipe for the snack cake, while Victor Milke, Guadalupe Pérez, and Roberto Servitje designed the molds necessary to produce the snack cake. At first, the molds only made two Gansito cakes at a time; today's can create 18 at the same time. It was one of the first three individually wrapped snack cakes produced at the Marinela factory, and the first order made at the factory was for 500 Gansito, which took eight hours to create. The snack cake took precedence in the Marinela brand, and Lorenzo Servitje and Jaime Jorba, two of the original founders of Grupo Bimbo and Marinela, called Gansito the star of Marinela products.

Gansito became Marinela's product leader, representing 65% of all product sales. At first, it only cost consumers 80 cents, and by 1975 Marinela was selling 1 million Gansito cakes a day.

The snack cake became a product of the Marinela brand under Grupo Bimbo. As Bimbo expanded throughout Mexico and established distribution routes to remote villages, the cake gained widespread recognition. The Gansito mascot, which appears on the packaging, was designed by Alfonso Velasco, a co-founder of Bimbo. Velasco also created the tagline "¡Recuérdame!" ("Remember me!"). Unlike some other snack cakes, Gansito is coated with chocolate-flavored icing and sprinkles and contains both crème and jelly filling. The dessert was initially delivered by bicycle, and later by three-wheeled motor vans known as "ganseras." The delivery drivers were called "ganseros," and their distribution routes were referred to as "rutas ganseras."
