= Twinkie the Kid =

Mascot for Twinkies cakes

- Voiced by: Allen Swift

In-universe information
- Species: Twinkie

Twinkie the Kid is the mascot for Twinkies, Hostess's golden cream-filled snack cakes. He is a registered trademark of Hostess Brands. He made his debut in 1971. He has appeared on product packaging, in commercials and as related collectible merchandise, except for a brief period between 1988 and 1990 when he was temporarily removed.

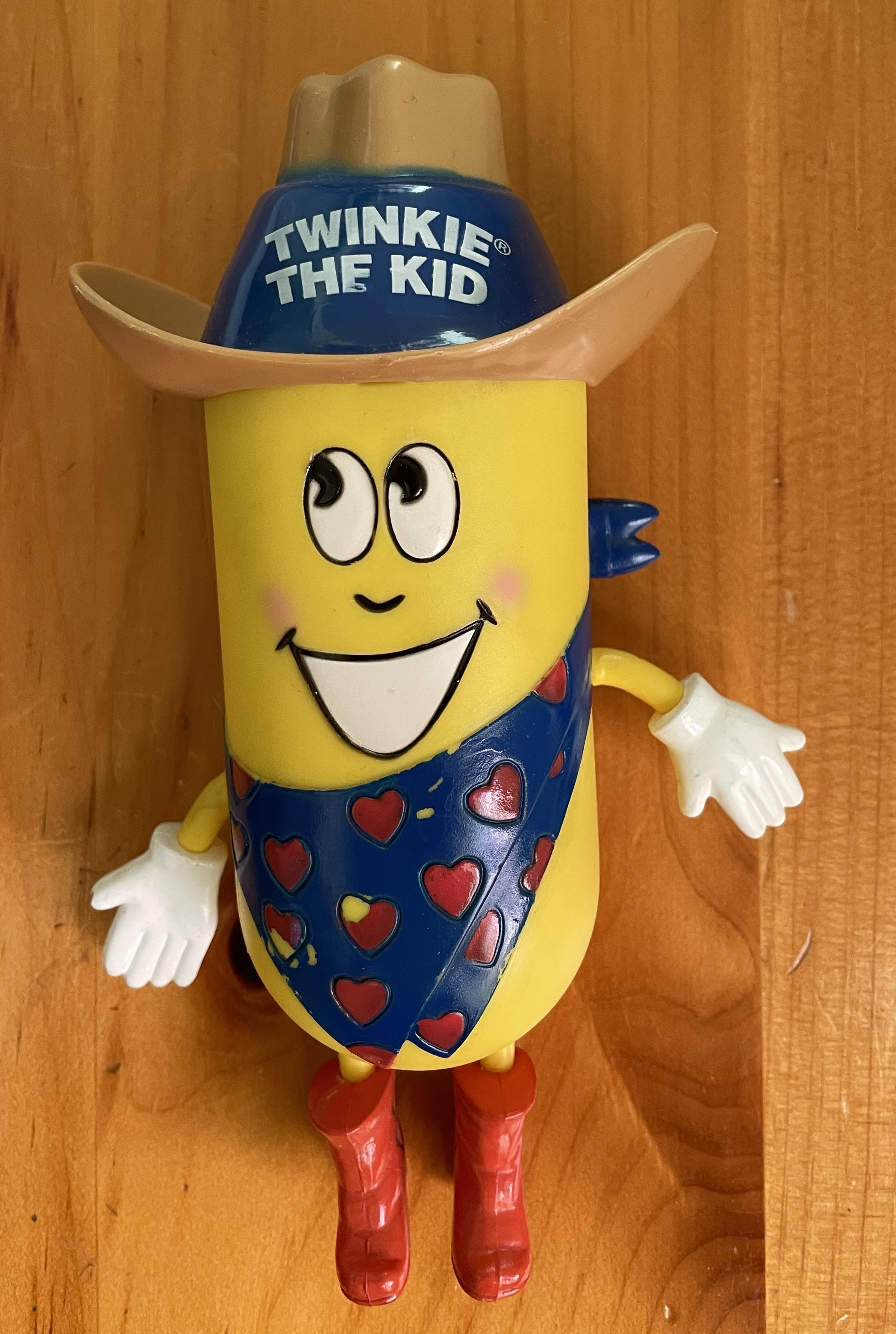
A Twinkie the Kid-shaped Twinkie holder

== Description ==
Twinkie the Kid is an anthropomorphized Twinkie appearing as a wrangler. He wears boots, gloves, a kerchief with hearts, and a ten-gallon hat with the words "Twinkie the Kid" on the band. He was created by Denny Lesser, a route delivery driver for Hostess in the San Fernando Valley. He designed the mascot and his wife made the costume that he used for a traveling promotional campaign.

== Animated commercial appearances ==
The character appeared in animated TV advertisements for Twinkies in the 1970s, voiced by Allen Swift.

== See also ==
- Captain Cupcake
- Chauncey Chocodile
- Fruit Pie the Magician
