= Fruit Pie the Magician =

Mascot of Hostess fruit pies

Fruit Pie the Magician

Fruit Pie the Magician was the official mascot for Hostess fruit pies from 1973 until at least early 2006. Fruit Pie the Magician was featured in print ads in comic books as well as animated in television commercials. The character appeared on Hostess product labels as an anthropomorphic fruit pie sporting a cape, white gloves, a top hat, and a magic wand.

Hostess described the mascot: "Fruit Pie the Magician loves to entertain friends with his wacky magic tricks. His favorite magic trick is to make Hostess Fruit Pies appear out of thin air. You always have to keep an eye on the Magician, or else he may play a trick on you."

== See also ==
- Captain Cupcake
- Fruit pie
- Twinkie the Kid
