= Snack cake =

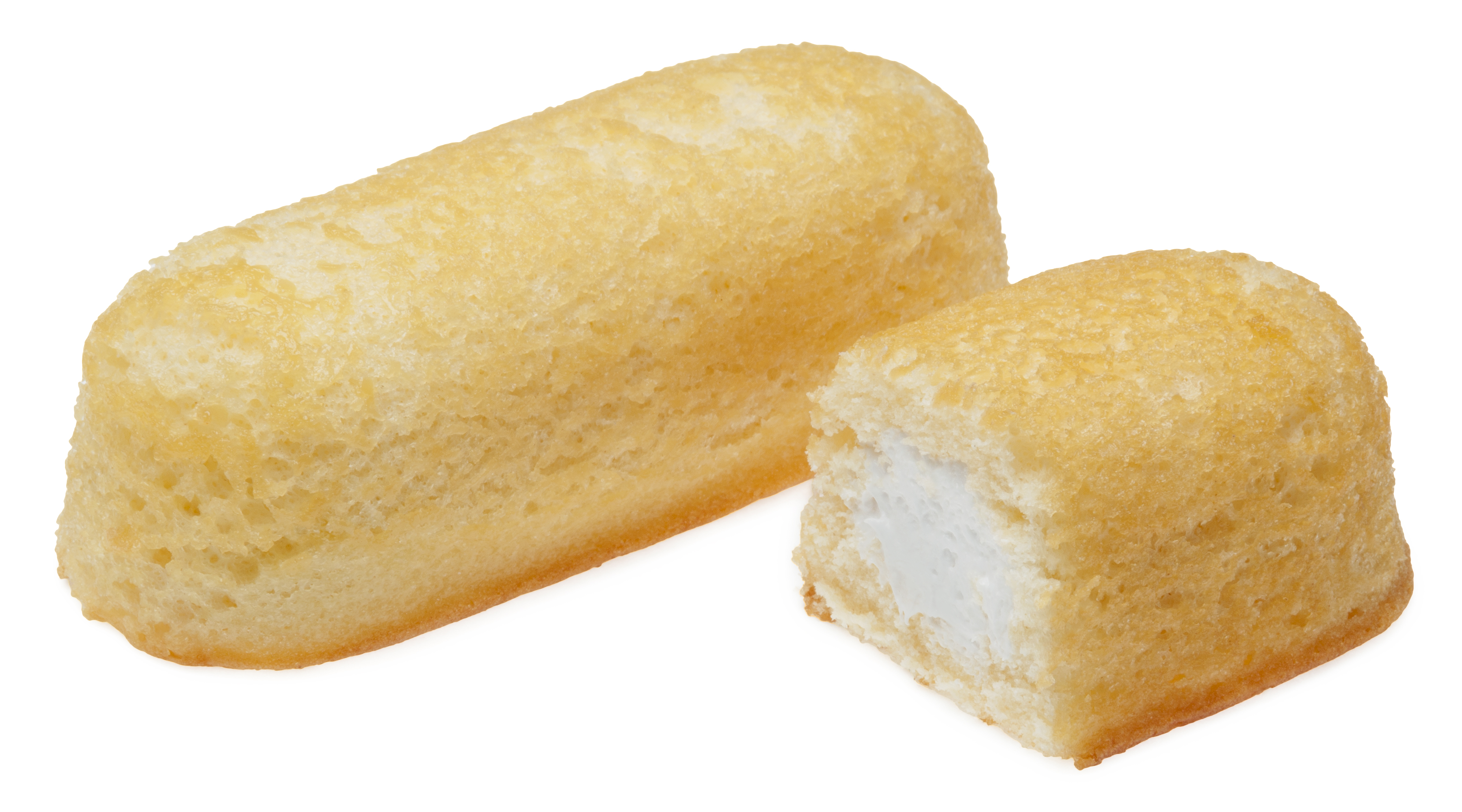
- Hostess Twinkies snack cakes
- Type: Cake
- Main ingredients: Cake base, icing

Snack cakes are small, indivudually portioned, pre-packaged type of baked dessert confectionery baked with cake, sugar, and icing that is specifically designed for quick snacking.

== Markets ==
=== Canada ===
The main manufacturer in Canada is Vachon Inc. which makes and distributes such products as May West, Jos. Louis, Passion Flakie, and Ah Caramel!.

=== Mexico ===
Grupo Bimbo is a manufacturer of snack cakes in Mexico, and is the parent company of Marinela, which sells the Gansito brand of snack cakes.

=== United States ===
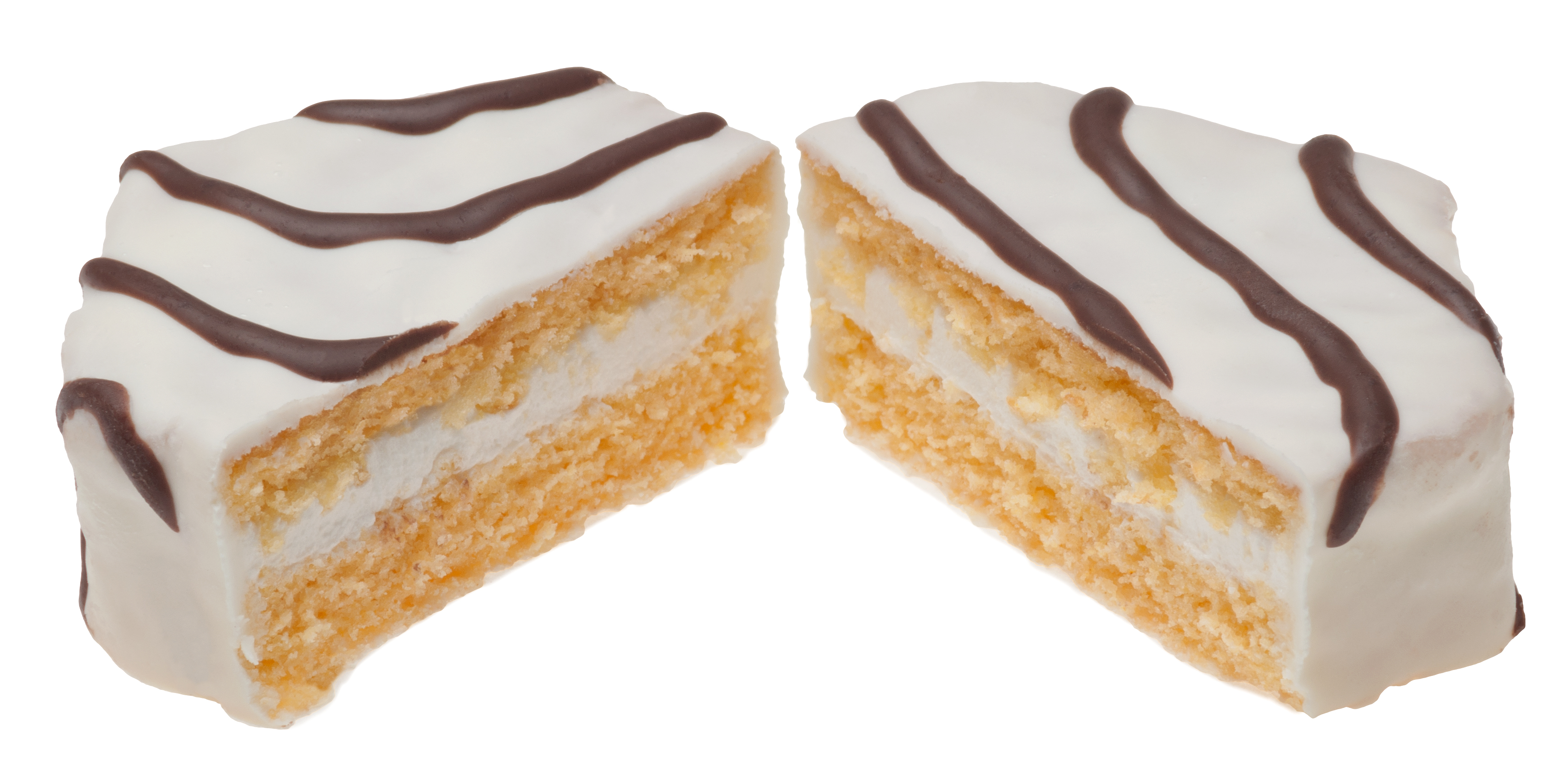
Little Debbie Zebra Cake

Snack cakes can be found in many American supermarkets and convenience stores, sold either individually or by the box. Examples include Drake's Devil Dogs, Twinkies and zebra cakes. Well-known American manufacturers of snack cakes include Hostess, Little Debbie, Dolly Madison, Tastykake and Drake's. In 2004, the snack-cake industry in the US experienced major consolidation, which resulted in fewer products being offered to consumers. For example, Dolly Madison zingers, Hostess brand Twinkies, and Drake's coffee cakes were all solely produced by the now-defunct Interstate Bakeries Corporation.

=== United Kingdom ===
Jaffa cakes are a popular type of biscuit-like snack cake in Ireland and the United Kingdom.

=== Philippines ===
The main manufacturers in the Philippines are Monde Nissin, Rebisco, Universal Robina, Lemon Square and Regent Foods Corporation, which produces and distributes snack cakes such as Fudgee Barr, Inipit, Quake, Lava Cake, Monde, Cream-O Cake Bar and Regent Cake.

=== Indonesia ===
Indonesian company Kino Indonesia which produces snack cakes such as Kino Nastar.

== See also ==
- Gansito
- List of desserts
