= Twinkie =

American snack cake

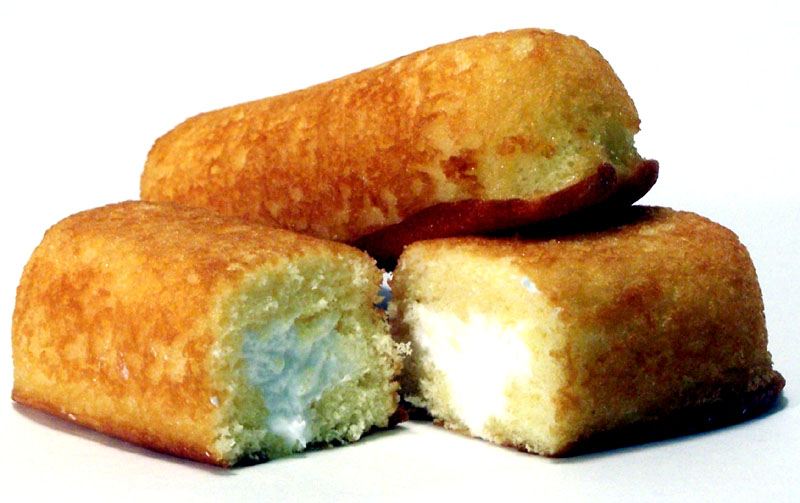
- Type: Junk food; Snack cake
- Inventor: James Dewar
- Inception: 1930
- Manufacturer: Hostess Brands; Grupo Bimbo (Canada)

The Twinkie is an American, soft snack cake, described on its packaging as "golden sponge cake with a creamy filling". Introduced in 1930, it was previously made and distributed by Hostess Brands. The brand is currently owned by Hostess Brands, Inc., in turn currently owned by The J.M. Smucker Company and having been formerly owned by private equity firms Apollo Global Management and C. Dean Metropoulos and Company as the second incarnation of Hostess Brands. During bankruptcy proceedings, Twinkie production was suspended on November 15, 2012, and resumed after an absence of a few months from American store shelves, becoming available again nationwide on July 15, 2013.

Grupo Bimbo's Vachon Bakery, which owns the Canadian rights to the product and made them during their absence from the U.S. market, produces Twinkies in Canada at a bakery in Montreal. They are made in Emporia, Kansas, in the U.S. Twinkies are also available in Mexican stores as "Submarinos" made by Marinela, and as "Tuinky" made by Wonder; both Marinela and Wonder are also subsidiaries of Mexican bread company Grupo Bimbo. In Egypt, Twinkies are produced under the company Edita. Twinkies are also available in the United Kingdom and Ireland under the Hostess brand name where they are sold in Sainsbury's, Tesco, ASDA, and B&M stores. Twinkies are produced and distributed by multiple commercial bakeries in China, where Hostess does not own the brand.

== History ==
Twinkies were invented on April 6, 1930, by Canadian-born baker James "Jimmy" Alexander Dewar for the Continental Baking Company in Schiller Park, Illinois. Realizing that several machines used for making cream-filled strawberry shortcakes sat idle when strawberries were out of season, Dewar conceived a snack cake filled with banana cream, which he dubbed the Twinkie. He said he came up with the name when he saw a billboard in St. Louis for "Twinkle Toe Shoes".

During World War II, bananas were rationed, and the company was forced to switch to vanilla cream. This change proved popular, and banana-cream Twinkies were not widely re-introduced. The original flavor was occasionally found in limited time only promotions; the company used vanilla cream for most Twinkies. In 1988, Fruit and Cream Twinkies were introduced with a strawberry filling swirled into the cream. The product was soon dropped. Vanilla's dominance over banana flavoring was challenged in 2005, following a month-long promotion of the movie King Kong. Hostess saw its Twinkie sales rise 20% during the promotion; in 2007, the company restored the banana-cream Twinkie to its snack lineup although they are now made with 2% banana purée.

In November 2012, as Hostess announced its plan to shut down its operations, Time ranked the Twinkie #1 in its list of 10 "iconic" junk foods, saying that "they've been a staple in our popular culture and, above all, in our hearts. Often criticized for its lack of any nutritional value whatsoever, (Note: This is a case of hyperbole; the nutrition facts label of 1 serving (2 Twinkie cakes) describes, inter alia, 2 grams of protein and 1 milligram of iron.) the Twinkie has managed to persevere as a cultural and gastronomical icon."

=== Hostess bankruptcy ===
On January 11, 2012, parent company Hostess filed for Chapter 11 bankruptcy protection. Twinkie sales for the year, as of December 25, 2011, were 36 million packages, down almost 20% from a year earlier. Hostess said customers had migrated to healthier foods. On November 16, 2012, Hostess officially announced that it "will be winding down operations and has filed a motion with the U.S. bankruptcy court seeking permission to close its business and sell its assets, including its iconic brands and facilities." Bakery operations were suspended at all plants.

On November 19, 2012, Hostess and the Bakers Union agreed to mediation, delaying the shutdown for two days. On November 21, 2012, U.S. bankruptcy judge Robert Drain approved Hostess' request to shut down, ending Twinkie production in the United States.

=== Return of Twinkies to U.S. market ===
On March 18, 2013, it was reported that Twinkies would return to store shelves in May of that year. Twinkies, along with other Hostess Brands, were purchased out of bankruptcy by Apollo Global Management and Metropoulos & Co for $410 million. Twinkies returned to U.S. shelves on July 15, 2013. Apollo subsequently sold Hostess for $2.3 billion.

Before Hostess Brands filed for bankruptcy, Twinkies were reduced in size. They now contain 135 kilocalories (560 kJ) and have a mass of 38.5 grams, while the original Twinkies contained 150 kilocalories (630 kJ) and had a mass of 42.5 grams. The new Twinkies also have a longer shelf life of 45 days, which was also a change made before bankruptcy, compared to the 26 days of the original Twinkies.

In April 2017, Chocolate Cake Twinkies came on the market.

Twinkies Cereal, made by Post, was introduced in December 2020.

== Deep-fried Twinkie ==
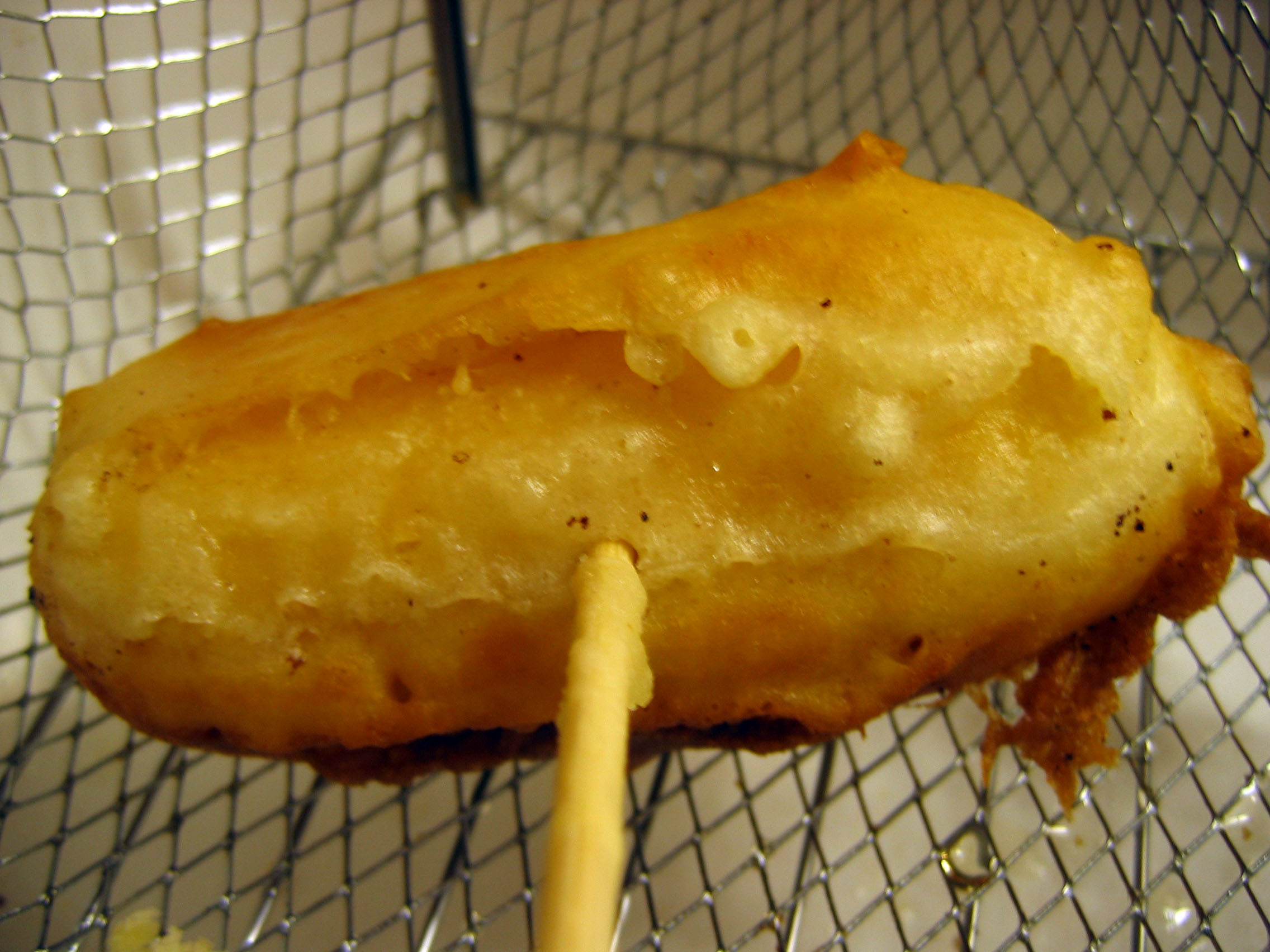
A deep-fried Twinkie

Deep frying a Twinkie involves freezing the cake, dipping it into batter, and deep-frying it. Melissa Clark (who interviewed one of the deep fried Twinkie's claimed inventors — Christopher Sell, originally from Rugby, England), writing in The New York Times, describes how "Something magical occurs when the pastry hits the hot oil. The creamy white vegetable shortening filling liquefies, impregnating the sponge cake with its luscious vanilla flavor [...] The cake softens and warms, nearly melting, contrasting with the crisp, deep-fried crust in a buttery and suave way. The pièce de résistance, however, is a ruby-hued berry sauce, adding a tart sophistication to all that airy sugary goodness."

In 2002, Brooklyn restaurateur Clint Mullen introduced the fried Twinkie at several state and county fairs to great popular acclaim, and the notion spread to other establishments that specialize in fried foods. Fried Twinkies are sold throughout the U.S. in fairs as well as ball games, and in various restaurants. Starting in August 2016, Walmart began selling prepackaged, frozen versions of the deep-fried Twinkie at stores nationwide in the US.

== In popular culture ==
=== Film and television ===
In 1984, the Twinkie became known worldwide in countries that did not sell the confection, due to a reference in the hit film Ghostbusters. In the film, the character Egon Spengler describes a speculated level of psychokinetic energy and uses a regular-sized Twinkie to represent the normal level of such energy in New York City. He then says that based on a recent sample, the Twinkie representing New York would be over 35 ft (11 m) long and weigh approximately 600 lb (270 kg), to which the character Winston Zeddemore replies, "That's a big Twinkie."

In the 1988 action film Die Hard, on Christmas Eve Al Powell, one of the most iconic characters, is introduced to the audience as a big Twinkie fan, in a scene where he is seen at a local 7-Eleven near the Nakatomi Plaza also known as the 2121 Avenue of the Stars or formerly the Fox Plaza buying many Twinkies. When he proceeds to pay, Powell jokingly says to the store clerk "they're for my wife... she's pregnant" and the clerk sarcastically acknowledges and agrees.

The 1999 Family Guy episode "Da Boom" involves the Griffin family moving to Natick, Massachusetts, in search of a Twinkie factory following the Y2K apocalypse. The factory is shown to have survived completely intact, allowing the Griffins to use it as a food source and a means to rebuild society.

In the 2009 film Zombieland, Twinkies are the favorite snack of the character Tallahassee, who develops an obsession with finding one in the middle of a Zombie apocalypse.

During Hostess Brands' 2012 bankruptcy proceedings, television host Wendy Williams launched a "Save the Twinkie" campaign on her show to bring awareness to the financial problems of its parent company, and attempt to save the product from stopping production.

=== Slang ===
Twink is gay slang for a male who is usually in his late teens to twenties whose other traits may include a slim physique, a youthful appearance, and little or no body hair. The age range for twinks is generally considered to be from around 18 to 25 years old. Twink is used both as a neutral descriptor, which can be compared with bear, and as a pejorative. One possible origin of the term may be a derivation from Twinkie, commonly regarded as the quintessential junk food. The food is described as "little nutritional value, sweet to the taste, and creme-filled"; by comparison, the young men are described as "short, and blond, and full of creme", with creme being a euphemism for semen.

=== Song lyrics ===
"Habits (Stay High)", a 2013 song by Swedish singer Tove Lo, mentions Twinkies in the line "I get home, I got the munchies / Binge on all my Twinkies / Throw up in the tub / Then I go to sleep." In an interview, the singer confessed she had thought that "twinkie" was a synonym for "cookie" and that Hostess had sent her a sample of the product after the success of the song.

=== Twinkie defense ===
"Twinkie defense" is a derisive label for an improbable legal defense. It is not a recognized legal defense in jurisprudence, but a catch-all term coined by reporters during their coverage of the trial of defendant Dan White for the murders of San Francisco city Supervisor Harvey Milk and Mayor George Moscone. White's defense was that he suffered diminished capacity as a result of his depression. His change in diet from healthful food to Twinkies and other sugary foods was said to be a symptom of depression. Contrary to common belief, White's attorneys did not argue that the Twinkies were the cause of White's actions, but that their consumption was symptomatic of his underlying depression.

=== Twinkie diet ===
In 2010, Kansas State University professor Mark Haub went on a "convenience store" diet consisting mainly of a snack of Twinkies, Oreos, or Doritos every 3 hours in an attempt to demonstrate to his students "that in weight loss, pure calorie counting is what matters most, not the nutritional value of the food." He lost 27 pounds (12 kg) over a two-month period, returning his body mass index (BMI) to within normal range.

In addition to Twinkies, Haub ate Little Debbie snack cakes, cereals, cookies, brownies, Doritos, Oreos and other kinds of high calorie, low-nutrition foods that are usually found at convenience stores. However, despite calling it the "Twinkie diet", Haub also consumed 1 protein shake per day and one serving of canned green beans or 4 celery stalks, along with the Twinkies, Oreos, and Doritos. Besides the protein shake and multivitamin, Haub also ate nutritionally dense whole milk, carrots, and vitamin fortified cereal. This contradicts representations by other media outlets stating that Haub "only" ate junk food. He ate the vegetables at the dinner table in order to set a good example for his children.

Bodybuilder Sergio Oliva (1941–2012) would sometimes indulge in eating a box of Twinkies (with a 2-liter bottle of Mountain Dew) after his notoriously strenuous workouts.

=== Urban legend of shelf life ===
A common urban legend claims that Twinkies have a theoretically infinite shelf life, and can last unspoiled for a relatively long time of ten, fifty, or one hundred years due to the chemicals used in their production.

According to a company executive, Twinkies are on the shelf for a short time; he told The New York Times in 2000 that the "Twinkie is on the shelf no more than 7 to 10 days." The maximum shelf life was reported to have been 26 days, until the addition of stronger preservatives, beginning in 2012, increased it to 45 days. A box of Twinkies from shortly before Hostess's bankruptcy in 2012 was opened eight years later; one had completely molded over with cladosporium, another had a small amount of mold, and the creme filling in a third Twinkie had turned brown with the taste of "old sock".

The TV show The Simpsons depicted this claim in its 5th-season episode "Homer and Apu". A customer at the Kwik-E-Mart screws up a Twinkie and throws it on the floor in anger. Apu shouts after him, saying he cannot hurt a Twinkie. It then pops back into shape and Apu puts it back on the stand.

It has even been claimed that Twinkies could survive a nuclear war.

The movie WALL-E also depicted this claim. Among the collection of various things found left behind in mountains of garbage centuries prior by humanity on a thoroughly-polluted Earth, the titular robot WALL-E has a few packaged Twinkies (branded as Buy n Large "Kremies"), one of which he opens to feed his cockroach companion Hal, referencing the urban legends regarding Twinkies having a long shelf-life, particularly those claiming that Twinkies, like cockroaches, could potentially survive a nuclear catastrophe.

The 2012 Super Bowl Chevy Silverado Apocalypse commercial also gives a nod to the Twinkie's reputed durability.

== Gallery ==
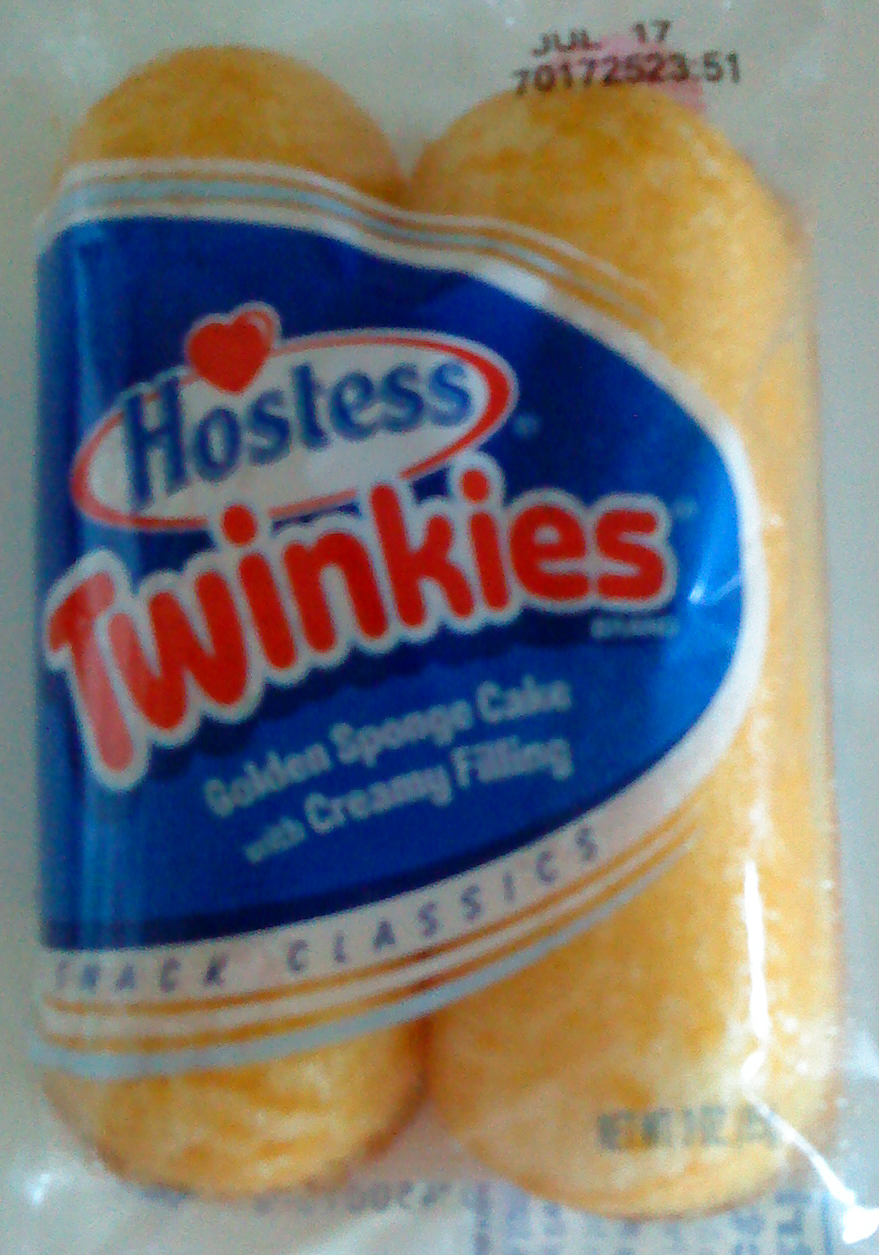

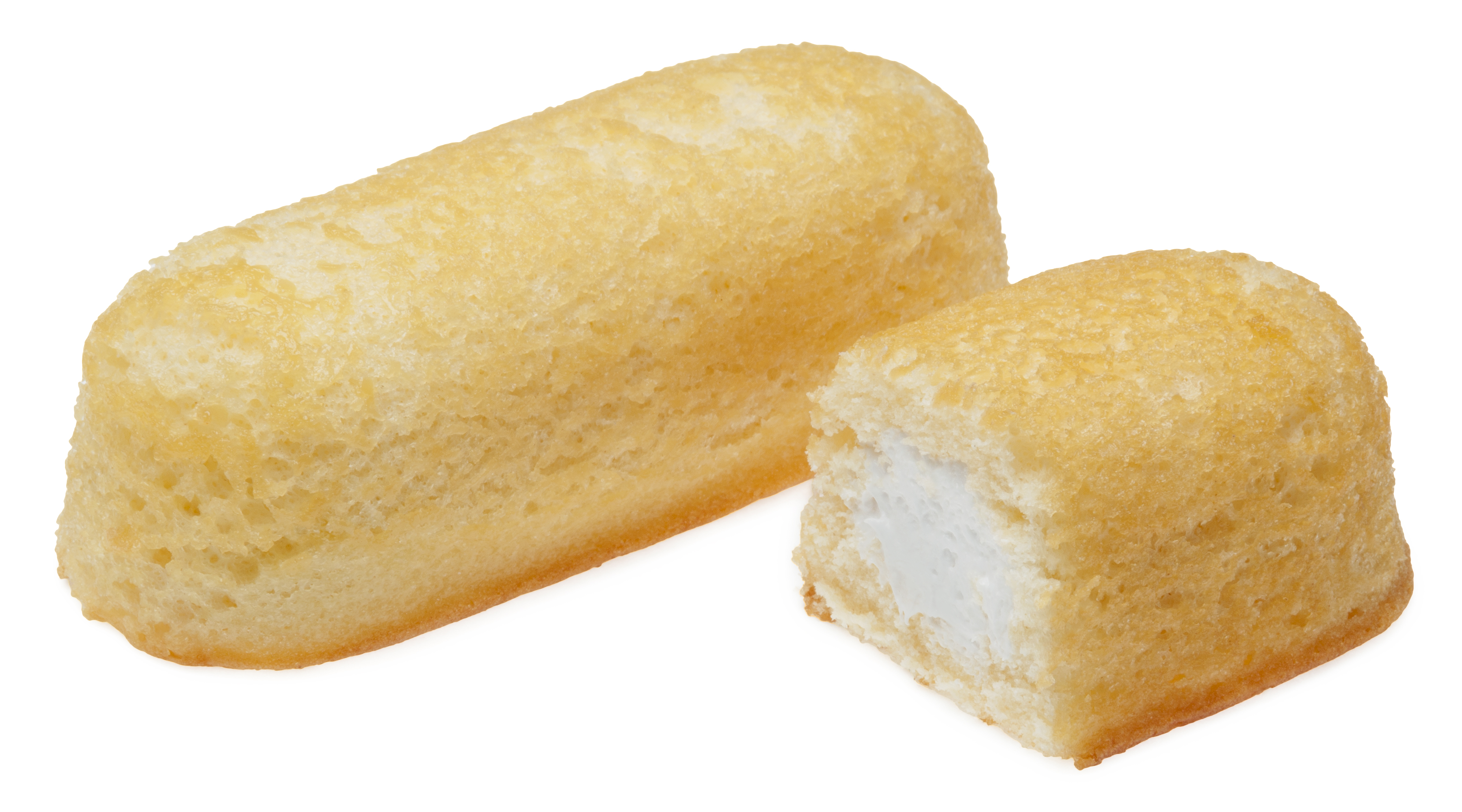

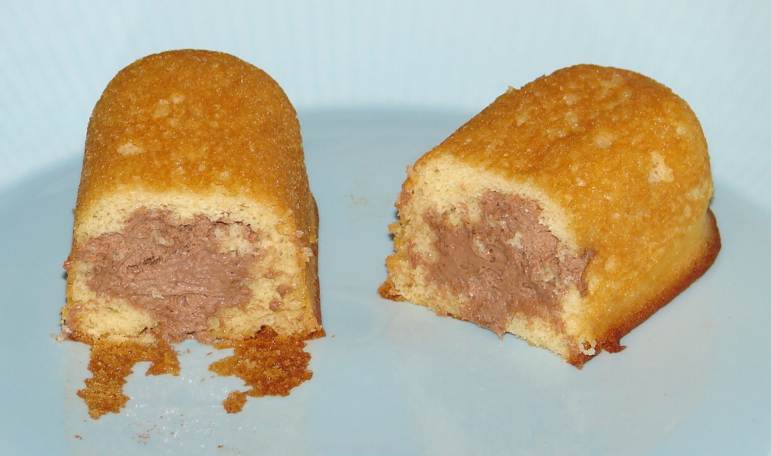
A cross-section of "Limited Edition" Chocolate Creme Twinkies from 2011

Box of Hostess Twinkies by Saputo Inc., sold in Canada

== See also ==
- Chocodile Twinkie
- Ding Dong
- Ho Hos
- Ladyfingers (biscuits)
- List of deep fried foods
- Twinkie the Kid
