= Hostess Brands =

American food company

Hostess Brands Inc.
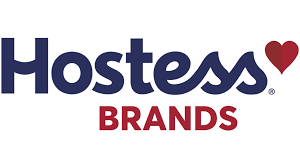
- Type: Subsidiary
- Industry: Food (bakery)
- Predecessor: Old HB
- Founded: June 2013; 13 years ago
- Key people: Jerry D. Kaminski (chairman of the board); Andy Callahan (CEO)
- Products: Brands such as Hostess, Voortman, Dolly Madison, Donettes, Twinkies, CupCakes, Ding Dongs, HoHos, Zingers, Snoballs
- Revenue: ▲US$1.358 billion (2022)
- Operating income: ▲US$220 million (2022)
- Net income: ▲US$164 million (2022)
- Total assets: ▲US$3.492 billion (2022)
- Total equity: ▲US$1.797 billion (2022)
- Number of employees: 2,000
- Parent: The J.M. Smucker Company (2023–present)
- Website: hostessbrands.com

Hostess Brands Inc. is an American bakery company formed in 2013. Its main operating subsidiaries are Hostess Brands, LLC, and Voortman Cookies Limited.

The company owns several bakeries in the United States that produce snack cakes under the Hostess and Dolly Madison brand names and its Canadian subsidiary, Voortman Cookies Ltd., produces wafers and cookies under the Voortman brand name.

The J.M. Smucker Company agreed to acquire Hostess Brands for $5.6 billion in a cash and stock deal on September 11, 2023. The purchase was completed in November.

== History ==
The Hostess Brands company formed in June 2013, having started as a venture by Apollo Global Management and C. Dean Metropoulos and Company, to acquire assets from Old HB, the company formerly known as Interstate Bakeries and Hostess Brands Inc. Apollo and Metropoulos purchased certain cake business assets of Old HB – which had filed for Chapter 11 bankruptcy and bankruptcy liquidation – through the bankruptcy court, ultimately assuming the name, branding and much of the product line of the former Hostess Brands.

These assets included four bakeries, located in Columbus, Georgia; Emporia, Kansas; Indianapolis, Indiana; and Schiller Park, Illinois. The Schiller Park facility later closed in October 2014.

In July 2016, Hostess announced it would be going public in an offering valuing the company at $2.3 billion. The deal would see Apollo Global Management and C. Dean Metropoulos and Company become minority owners, with The Gores Group taking a majority ownership position in the firm.

Instead of making an initial public offering, Gores Holdings, a Nasdaq-listed company, acquired Hostess via a spin-off, under a special-purpose acquisition company process. Gores Holdings subsequently renamed itself Hostess Brands, Inc., changing its ticker symbol from GRSH to TWNK, after the Twinkie brand snack cake.

In April 2018, the company announced that Andy Callahan would take over as CEO in May 2018.

The J.M. Smucker Company agreed to acquire Hostess Brands for $5.6 billion in a cash and stock deal on September 11, 2023. The acquisition was completed on November 7, 2023.

== Mergers and acquisitions ==
On June 14, 2016, Hostess acquired Superior Cake Products, making it the company's first acquisition since the Hostess brand returned in 2013.

On February 1, 2018, Hostess acquired the Big Texas and the Cloverhill Bakery brands from Aryzta.

On August 1, 2019, Hostess announced that it was selling Superior Cake Products to Sara Lee Frozen Bakery for $65 million.

On December 2, 2019, Hostess announced that it was purchasing Voortman Cookies Limited, a Canadian company, from Swander Pace Capital for approximately US$320 million (C$425 million). The transaction closed in January 2020.

== Products ==
- Baby Bundts
- Bouncers
- CupCakes
- Cinnamon Rolls
- Coffee Cakes
- Danish
- Ding Dong
- Donettes
- Fruit Pies
- Hot dog buns
- HoHos
- Jumbo Honey bun
- Kazbars
- Mini/Mega Muffins
- Sandwich bread
- Sno Balls
- Suzy Q
- Twinkies
  - Chocodile Twinkies
- Zingers

== See also ==
- Twinkie the Kid
