= Interstate Bakeries =

Bakeries of the United States

Old HB, Inc.
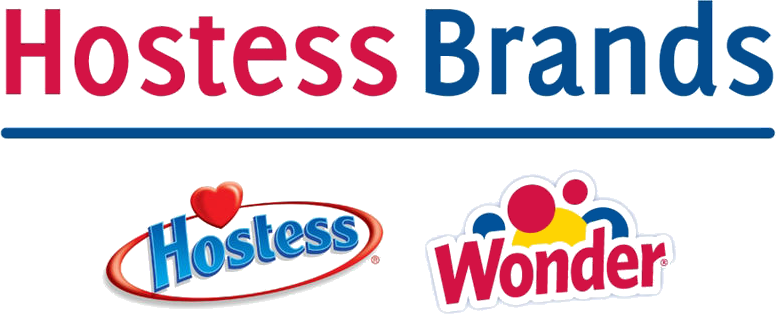
- Type: Private
- Industry: Food (bakery)
- Founded: 1930; 96 years ago
- Defunct: November 21, 2012; 13 years ago
- Fate: Chapter 7 bankruptcy liquidation sale
- Successor: Hostess Brands
- Headquarters: Irving, Texas, United States
- Key people: Gregory F. Rayburn, CEO
- Products: Brands such as Wonder Bread (US only), Hostess, Nature's Pride, Merita Breads, Home Pride, and Dolly Madison
- Revenue: $2.8 billion (2008)
- Net income: $144 million (2008)
- Total equity: $462 million (2008)

Old HB, Inc., known as Hostess Brands from 2009 to 2013 and established in 1930 as Interstate Bakeries Corporation, was a wholesale baker and distributor of bakery products in the United States. Before its 2012 closure and liquidation, it owned the Hostess, Wonder Bread, Nature's Pride, Dolly Madison, Butternut Breads, and Drake's brands.

For many years the company was called Interstate Bakeries and based at 12 East Armour Boulevard, Kansas City, Missouri. In 2009, after it emerged from a 2004 bankruptcy, its name was changed to Hostess Brands and its headquarters moved to Irving, Texas. Hostess Brands sought bankruptcy protection again in January 2012.

On November 16, 2012, the company filed a motion in United States Bankruptcy Court for the Southern District of New York in White Plains to close its business and sell its assets. On November 21, the motion was accepted and a judge agreed to sell the Hostess brands. The Hostess and Dolly Madison brands are now produced by Hostess Brands, which was acquired by The J.M. Smucker Company in 2023.

== History ==
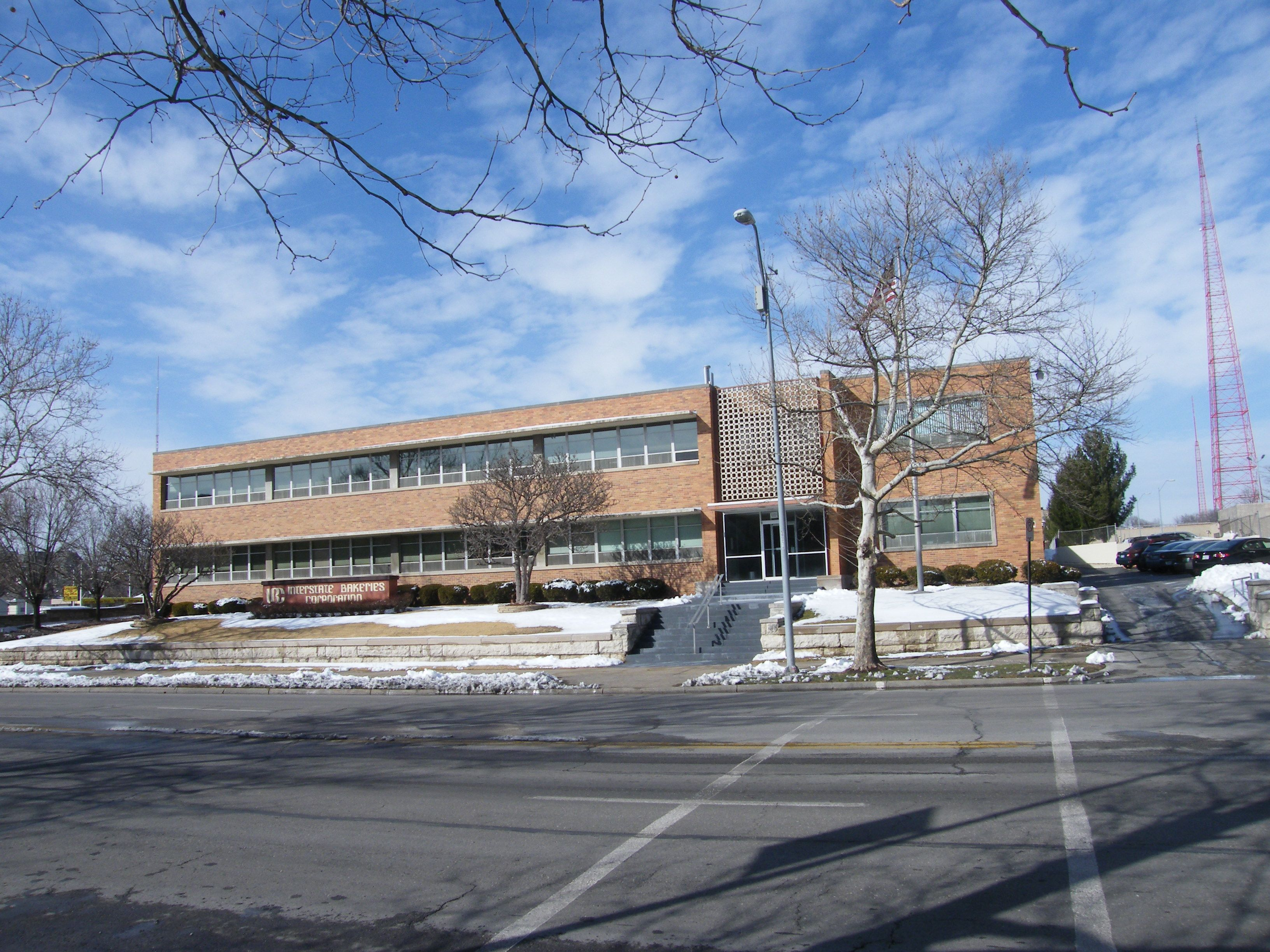
Former headquarters on Armour Boulevard in Kansas City (later the operations center).

Former Interstate Bakeries logo

=== Interstate Bakeries and Interstate Brands ===
The company has its roots in Nafziger Bakeries, founded by Ralph Leroy Nafziger in a church basement at 6th and Prospect Avenue in Kansas City in 1905. Nafziger expanded the bakeries and bought out competitors. In 1925 he sold Nafziger to Purity Bakeries (which became American Bakeries) and acquired a controlling interest in Schulze Baking Company and its Butternut Breads brand.

In 1930 Nafziger announced the formation of the Interstate Bakeries Corporation (IBC) with the merger of Schulze Bakery and the seven bakers of Western Bakeries of Los Angeles to become the fifth largest baker in the United States. The company sold Butternut bread, wrapped in gingham, to grocery stores.

Schulze and Western continued to operate separately under the Interstate umbrella until 1937, when they merged with Interstate Bakeries. In 1943 Interstate acquired the Supreme Baking Company of Los Angeles, and in 1950 it bought the O'Rourke Baking Company of Buffalo, New York.

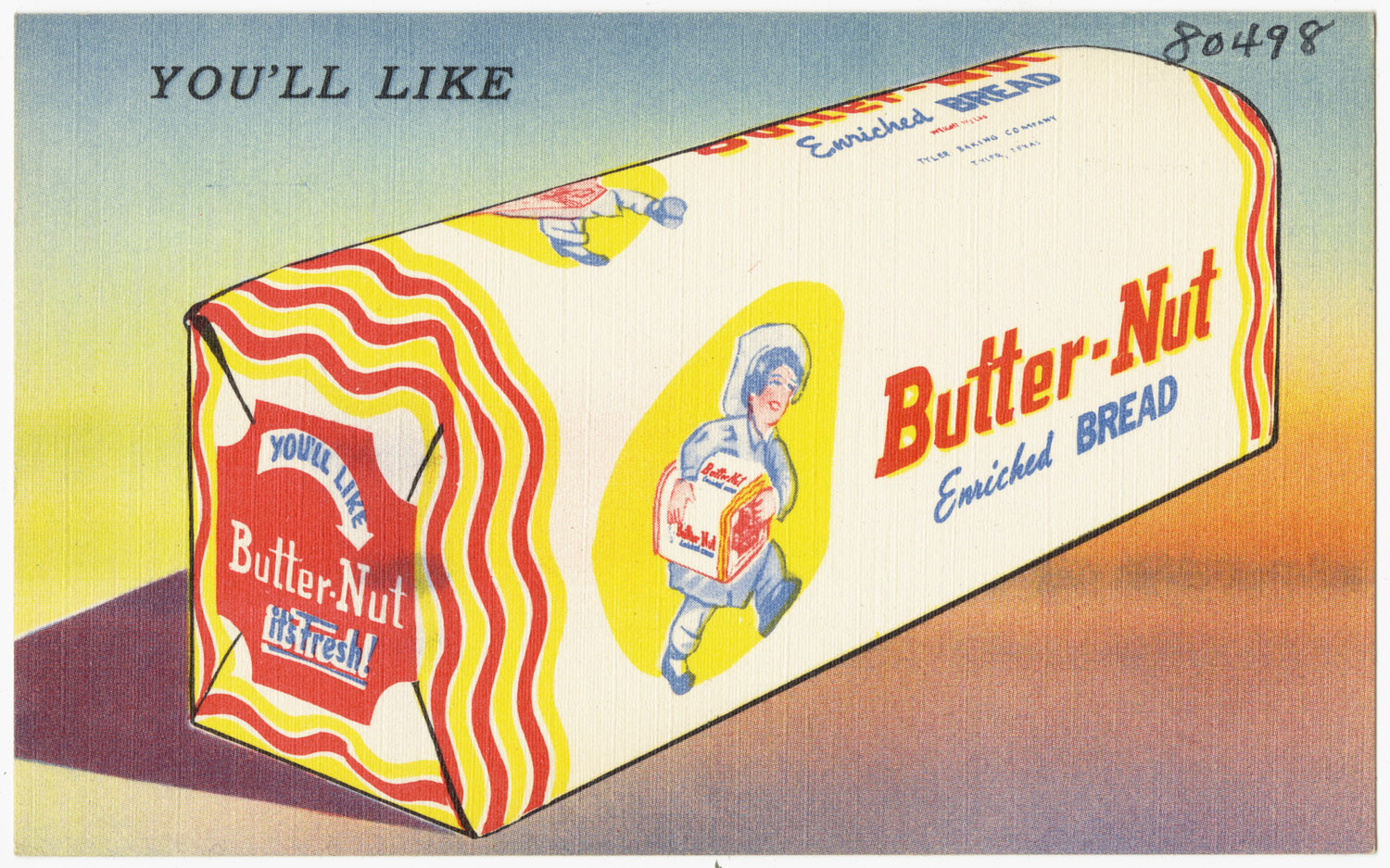
Butter-Nut bread package, 1930–1945

Acquisitions during the 1950s and early 1960s included the Ambrosia, Remar, Butter Cream, Campbell-Sell and Schall Tasty baking companies, the Kingston Cake and Cobb's Sunlit bakeries, Sweetheart Bread Company and Hart's Bakeries. In the late 1960s IBC acquired Millbrook Bread, Shawano Farms and the Baker and Shawano canning companies. In 1969 IBC changed its name to Interstate Brands, with its signature brands Butternut and Blue Seal breads and Dolly Madison cakes; Butternut Breads had been in business since 1902.

=== DPF (1975) ===
In 1975 Interstate was acquired by the Data Processing Financial and General Corporation (DPF), a computer-leasing company that had encountered difficulties during the IBM antitrust battles which changed the pricing of IBM hardware. To change its business model, DPF used its cash to buy a low-tech company. The merged company, headquartered in Hartsdale, New York, kept the DPF acronym while continuing to divest its remaining technology assets. Investing heavily in its plants, it acquired the Silver Loaf Baking Company, Eddy Bakeries and Mrs. Cubbison's Foods.

=== Interstate Bakeries and IBC Holdings ===
In 1981 DPF completed the sale of its remaining computer systems and changed the company name back to the original Interstate Bakeries, moving its headquarters back to Kansas City. In 1986 Interstate acquired Purity Baking Company and Stewart Sandwiches, followed in 1987 by Landshire Food Products. The following year Interstate became a privately held company, and its name changed to IBC Holdings. IBC bought the Merita-Cotton's Bakeries division of the American Bakeries Company. In 1991, IBC again became a public company and changed its name back to Interstate Bakeries.

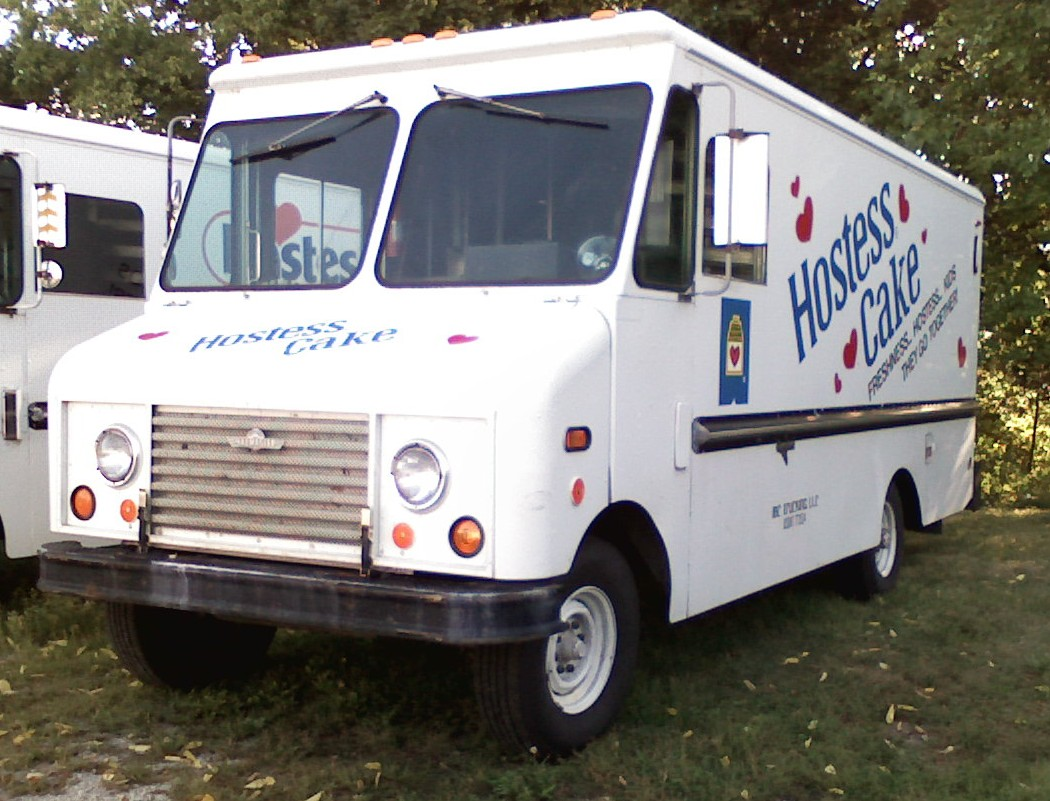
Interstate Bakeries Hostess delivery truck

=== Continental Baking merger (1995) ===
In January 1995, Interstate acquired the Continental Baking Company from Ralston Purina for $330 million and 16.9 million shares of Interstate stock. Continental had acquired Taggart Bakeries of Indianapolis in 1925, and the deal brought Taggart's creations (including Wonder Bread and the Hostess brand) to Interstate. Taggart had created Hostess in 1921, and the brand focused on cakes like Twinkies, CupCakes, Ding Dongs and Ho Hos (created during Continental's ownership). At this time, the merged company also bought the San Francisco French Bread Company, John J. Nissen Baking Company, Drake's and My Bread Company.

With the merger, Interstate held two national bread divisions: Butternut and Wonder Bread. The divisions had different cultures: Butternut was unregimented, with each bakery a self-contained profit center, and Wonder Bread was structured; this caused early problems. In both divisions, snack cakes were more profitable due to economy of scale and logistics. When extended-shelf-life enzymes were developed for bread, it was hoped to convert small, less-efficient bakeries into a network of large bakeries like their snack-cakes operations. The new enzymes gave the bread a different taste and texture, and market forces reduced prices and sales.

=== Bankruptcy (2004) ===
On September 22, 2004, Interstate Bakeries filed for Chapter 11 bankruptcy. The company named a new chief executive, Tony Alvarez. Interstate Bakery's stock, which had been $34 per share, fell to $2.05 with the bankruptcy. During the bankruptcy proceedings (at the time, the longest-running in U.S. history), Interstate fought a 2007 bid from Mexican baker Grupo Bimbo and Ron Burkle of the Yucaipa Companies.

Under Craig Jung, Interstate Bakeries emerged from bankruptcy as a private company on February 3, 2009. The plan included a 50-percent equity stake by Ripplewood Holdings and credit lines from General Electric Capital and GE Capital Markets, Silver Point Finance and Monarch Master Funding. Interstate's unionized workers made contract concessions in exchange for equity in the company.

During the 2004–2009 bankruptcy period Interstate closed nine of its 54 bakeries and more than 300 outlet stores, and its workforce declined from 32,000 to 22,000. The company dropped regional brands and operating agreements, such as an agreement to produce Sunbeam Bread for the northeastern U.S.

=== Hostess Brands (2009) ===
On November 2, 2009, IBC became Hostess Brands, named for its Twinkies-and-cupcakes cake division. Hostess Brands continued its bread lines, including Wonder Bread. The company's subsidiaries, such as Interstate Brands Corporation and IBC Sales Corporation, continued displaying their name and logo on Hostess Brands products.

=== Bankruptcy and liquidation ===
In December 2011, it was reported that Hostess Brands was on the verge of filing for bankruptcy a second time. The company stopped paying future pension benefits after August, breaking its union contracts. According to a Hostess employee, "We understand that, should we pursue some form of legal action to require the company to live up to the terms of the contract, they may close, but we have come to believe that they will close anyway. We believe the company is poorly managed and the only hope is a complete change in management".

On January 10, 2012, Hostess Brands filed for Chapter 11 bankruptcy for the second time. In its filing, the company said it "is not competitive, primarily due to legacy pension and medical benefit obligations and restrictive work rules". According to Hostess, it employed 19,000 people and was more than $860 million in debt. The company said it would continue to operate with $75 million of debtor-in-possession financing from Monarch Alternative Capital, Silver Point Capital and other investors.

In March Brian Driscoll resigned as CEO and was replaced by Gregory F. Rayburn, who had been hired as chief restructuring officer nine days earlier. Fortune reported that unions in the company were unhappy with Driscoll's proposed compensation package of $1.5 million, plus cash incentives and $1.95 million in long-term compensation. The court had discovered that Hostess executives received raises of up to 80 percent the previous year. Rayburn cut the salaries of the four top Hostess executives to $1, to be restored by January 1 of the following year or earlier.

In July 2012, the New York Post reported that negotiations with the Teamsters Union, led by Silver Point Capital, were close to an agreement allowing Hostess Brands to cut employee pay and benefits if the company continued funding its pension plans. In May, as required by the Worker Adjustment and Retraining Notification Act, the company's 19,000 workers were warned of a possible layoff. In an email to the Marysville, California Appeal-Democrat, Hostess spokesman Erik Halvorson wrote that the May notices were to alert employees to a possible sale of the company but "our goal is still to emerge from bankruptcy as a growing company with a strong future". Although the layoff notices listed July 7–21 as dates, on July 5 another company spokesman told the Financial News & Daily Record that there were no immediate plans to lay off Hostess employees.

In November 2012, Hostess employees nationwide went on strike. The Bakery, Confectionery, Tobacco Workers and Grain Millers International Union (BCTGM), representing 6,600 Hostess employees, took action after a contract proposal from Hostess Brands was rejected by 92 percent of its members.

On November 16, Hostess announced that it was ceasing its plant operations and laying off most of its 18,500 employees. The company said that it intended to sell off its assets (including its well-known brand names) and liquidate. According to CEO Gregory Rayburn, "Hostess Brands will move promptly to lay off most of its 18,500-member workforce and focus on selling its assets to the highest bidders." A BCTGM press release issued that day read in part, "When a highly-respected financial consultant, hired by Hostess, determined earlier this year that the company's business plan to exit bankruptcy was guaranteed to fail because it left the company with unsustainable debt levels, our members knew that the massive wage and benefit concessions the company was demanding would go straight to Wall Street investors and not back into the company."

According to Rayburn, potential buyers expressed interest in acquiring the Hostess brand. On November 21, Judge Robert Drain cleared Hostess to close. In approving the plan, Drain ruled against U.S. Trustee for the Southern District Tracy Hope Davis' motion to convert the bankruptcy to a Chapter 7 bankruptcy with an appointed trustee to oversee liquidation. Davis criticized the plan's provisions, which would "'grant bonuses to insiders' and 'cherry-pick' which administrative claims get paid". Drain left Rayburn in charge of the liquidation; Hostess had argued that its assets would devalue if the company had to wait for a trustee to get up to speed on the company. Hostess Brands' liquidation plan was finalized by a federal bankruptcy judge on November 29. In January 2013, the company asked a judge to set a March 21 deadline for workers to file back-pay claims. On February 11, a U.S. Bankruptcy Court judge in New York approved stalking horse bidders for Hostess Brands.

The company received bids for assets from Walmart, Target, Kroger, Flowers Foods and Grupo Bimbo, and was expected to sell its snack-cake and bread brands during 2013. On January 8, 2013, Hostess Brands hired Hilco to sell its equipment, machinery and real estate. Three days later the company announced a $390 million stalking-horse bid by Flowers Foods for six of its bread brands (including Wonder Bread), and court approval was received for a February 28 auction of the brands.

On January 15, 2013, Hostess Brands began searching for a stalking-horse bidder for its snack cakes; four companies (Grupo Bimbo, a partnership of Apollo Global Management and C. Dean Metropoulos and Company, Hurst Capital and McKee Foods) were negotiating. Two weeks later the company picked Apollo Global Management and C. Dean Metropoulos and Company as lead bidder for its snack cakes, with the bid deadlines for all Hostess brands March 11 and 12.

=== Buyers ===
It was announced on January 28, 2013, that United States Bakery was the leading bidder for Hostess' Sweetheart, Eddy's, Standish Farms and Grandma Emilie's brands and McKee Foods was the leading bidder for its Drake's brand, which included Ring Dings, Yodels and Drake's Devil Dogs. On March 11, Apollo Global Management made the sole bid ($410 million) for the company's snack business, which included Twinkies; this company later went public under the name Hostess Brands and trade on the New York Stock Exchange under ticker TWNK.

=== Hostess Brands ===
On June 6, 2013, the new Hostess Brands reopened the Emporia, Kansas plant. Hostess announced ten days later that production would resume the following month, and on June 23 said that its brands would be back on store shelves on July 15. although the company would sell fewer products than before, new president Rich Seban said that it might produce innovative pastries and snacks. "We can have some fun with that mixture," Seban said, suggesting that Hostess might experiment with gluten-free, higher-fiber and lower-sugar and -sodium products.

On September 11, 2023, The J.M. Smucker Company announced it would buy Hostess for $5.6 billion in a cash and stock deal.

== Brands ==
=== Sold to Apollo and Metropoulos, later J.M. Smucker ===
In January 2013, a joint venture by Apollo Global Management and C. Dean Metropoulos and Company became the leading bidder to purchase Dolly Madison and the Hostess brand of snacks. Silver Point Capital, Grupo Bimbo and Hurst Capital also placed bids for both brands. On March 12, Apollo and Metropoulos won the bid to buy the brands from Hostess for $410 million. The deal was approved by a bankruptcy court, and C. Dean Metropoulos and Company principal Daren Metropoulos announced that Hostess products would be sold again on July 15.

This division eventually went public as the second incarnation of Hostess Brands, and announced it would be acquired by J.M. Smucker on September 11, 2023.

=== Sold to Bimbo Bakeries USA ===
Bimbo Bakeries USA outbid Flowers Foods for the rights to Beefsteak on February 28, 2013, and the deal was approved by a bankruptcy court on March 20. In August, the trademarks of J. J. Nissen and the web domain jjnissenbreads.com were transferred to Bimbo Bakeries, which later purchased other regional Hostess bread brands: Colombo, Cotton's, Emperor Norton, Fisherman's Wharf, Parisian and Toscana.

=== Sold to Flowers Foods ===
In January 2013 it was announced that Flowers Foods had offered to buy six of Hostess' bread brands, including Wonder Bread. The deal, initially structured at $360 million, involved 20 bakeries and 38 depots. Flowers Foods won the bid to purchase five of the six bread brands (except Beefsteak, purchased by Grupo Bimbo) on February 28. The deal went through a bankruptcy court in March and was completed on July 22, 2013. The five brands are Butternut Bread, Home Pride, Merita Breads, Nature's Pride and Wonder Bread.

=== Sold to Lewis Brothers Bakeries ===
The rights to the following Hostess brands were sold to Lewis Brothers Bakeries in December 2013:

- Blue Ribbon
- Braun's
- Bread du Jour
- Continental
- Countess
- County Fair
- D'Agostino's
- Daffodil Farm
- Di Carlo
- Millbrook
- Nancy Martin
- Old World
- Ozark Mill
- Pantry Pride
- Sap's
- Weber's

=== Sold to McKee Foods ===
McKee Foods, owner of Hostess competitor Little Debbie, purchased the Drake's snack cakes on March 14, 2013 for $27.5 million. After the deal passed a bankruptcy court, McKee began selling the snacks on September 23.

=== Sold to United States Bakery ===
United States Bakery won the auction for four northwestern Hostess bakeries on March 15, 2013 for a reported $30.85 million, and the deal was approved by a bankruptcy court that month. The brands were Eddy's, Grandma Emile's, Standish Farms and Sweetheart Bakery. As of December 2015, the rights to the Baker's Inn and Dutch Hearth brands remain unsold.

== See also ==
- Vachon Inc. and George Weston Limited, holders of rights to select Hostess brand items in Canada
