= Bost's Bread =

American bread brand

Bost's Bread was a brand of baked bread distributed in the Western Carolinas, Virginia and Tennessee. Bakers in the eastern parts of the Carolinas and Virginia put out a similar product called Bunny Bread, made with nearly the same recipe.

At its height, the Bost's Bakery employed around 2,000 people in and around Shelby, North Carolina. The products of the company became widely known in part due to the advertising antics of Arthur Smith and his Crackerjacks, whose television shows Bost's Bread sponsored on WBTV in Charlotte, using slogans like "If it's Fresher'n Bost's it's Still in the Oven", "The Best Taste You Ever Toasted", and "Baked Slow to Sell Fast".

Around 1986 the Bost's Bakery was sold to Wonder Bread[Continental Baking Co.], which operated the Bakery 6 years till 1992, adding its staple "Wonder Bread", Twinkies, frosted cupcakes and other confections to the product line alongside the bread products.

In 1992 the parent company of Bost's and Wonder Bread (Continental Baking Co.) shut down the bakery in Shelby NC and the Hamburger and Hotdog Bun Bakery in Thomasville NC. Wonder Bread and Hostess cake lines were transferred to other plants within the Continental Baking company. In the early 1990s the formulas or recipes, intellectual property, as well as some hardware of Bost's Bread were sold to Waldensian Bakeries, owned by the Rostan family, longtime bakers of rival Sunbeam Bread. That company was sold in 1995 to Coopersmith, Inc. which sold Bost's Bread alongside its products for a few years before phasing out the brand around the year 2000, at which time the plant was owned by Earthgrains, Inc.

== See also ==
- List of brand name breads
