= Merita Breads =

Food brand

Merita is a brand of breads that was produced by Hostess Brands and now produced by Flowers Foods, available throughout the Southeastern United States until November 16, 2012, when Hostess's management decided to liquidate Hostess. The company gave as their reason for this action that they had been crippled by a strike by BCTGM, the bakers' union. Union spokespersons attributed the company's situation to poor management over a long period of years.

On January 11, 2013, Flowers Foods purchased the brand from Hostess.

A Vintage Sign Promoting Merita Bread

== Origins ==
William Fisch and Herman Malchow, who for three years had been operating a lunchroom in Birmingham, Alabama, established the Highland Bakery, which began producing breads in 1901. Starting with a single horse-and-wagon route and one retail bakeshop, the business grew and flourished. Legend has it that in the company's early years, an award known as the MERIT-A award, signifying highest merit, was conferred on some bakery products. This company consistently won the award and displayed the symbol “MERIT-A” on the packages. By mistake, a printer left out the hyphen and thus the name MERITA was born.

In 1910, Highland Baking Company merged with the Martin Cracker and Candy Company and the Huston Biscuit Company to form American Bakeries Candy Company. In 1912 candy production was halted, and the company was incorporated as American Bakeries Company, Inc.

Merita set up its first “bakery research laboratory” in 1921 to guard the purity and quality of its raw materials all the way through to finished products.

The Merita division of American Bakeries was purchased by Interstate Bakeries Corporation (later Hostess Brands, Inc.) in 1988. After the closure and liquidation of Hostess Brands in late 2012, Merita was sold to Flowers Foods for $390 million, in a deal that also included other Hostess bread brands such as Wonder Bread, Nature's Pride, Home Pride and Butternut.

== Marketing ==
In 1938 Merita brought The Lone Ranger radio adventures to the South for the first time. Broadcasts were three times a week for a half-hour on Monday, Wednesday, and Friday. Additionally, in 1949, Merita becoming the first advertiser in the South to sponsor a network television program when it sponsored The Lone Ranger television show.

Muppets, Inc. produced six 10-second commercials for Merita Bread in 1963 for markets in the southern US. The ads featured Wilkins and Wontkins, who were previously best known as the spokescharacters for the Washington, D.C.–based coffee company Wilkins Coffee.

In November 2010, Merita became the "official bread" of the Southeastern Conference (SEC) and all SEC Championship events through June 2013.

== See also ==
- List of brand name breads
