= List of brand name breads =

This is a list of brand name breads.

== Brand name breads ==
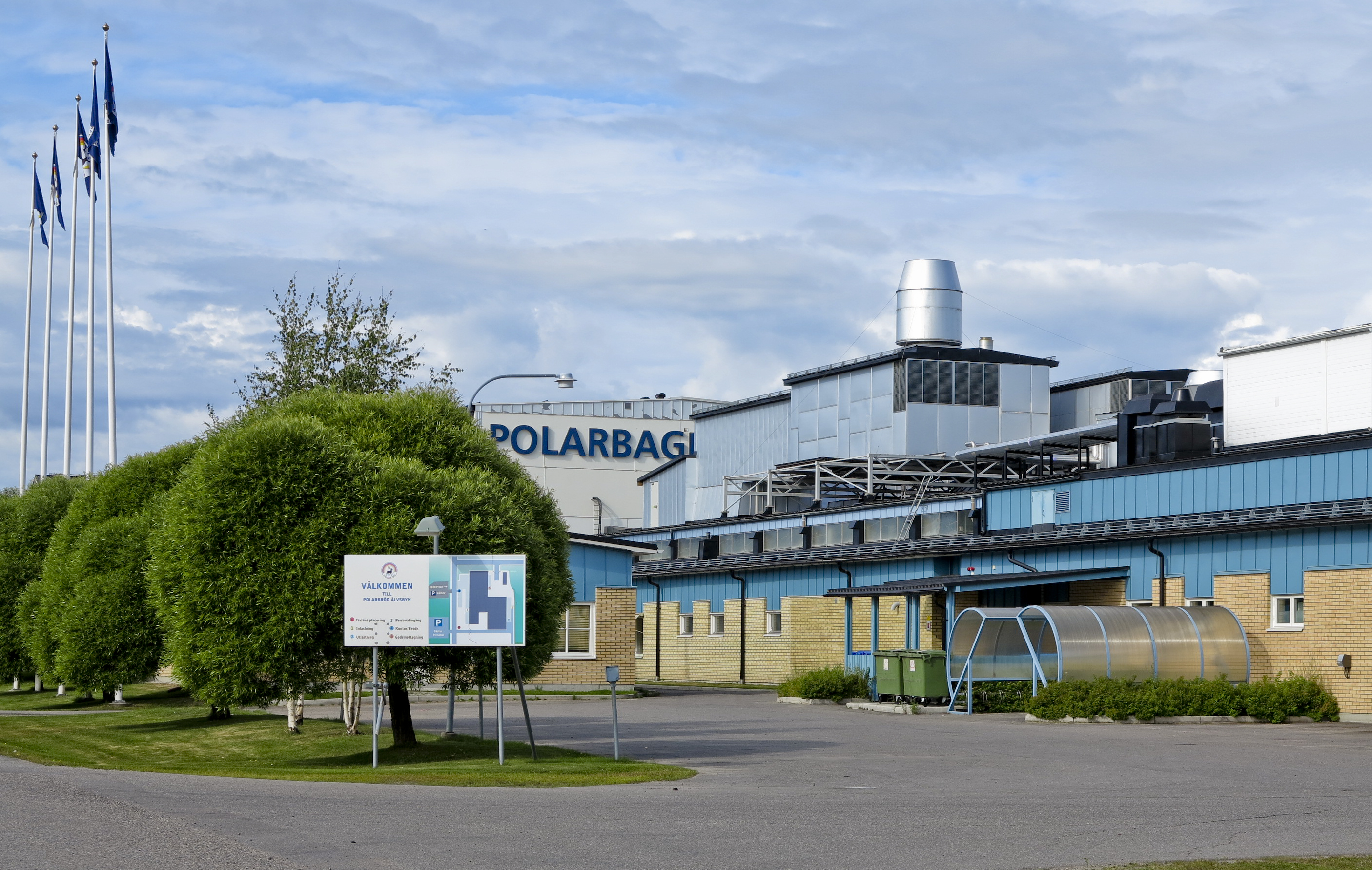
The Polarbröd bakery in Älvsbyn, Sweden

- Allinson
- Alvarado Street Bakery
- Bimbo Bakeries USA – Arnold, Ball Park, Beefsteak, Bimbo, Brownberry, EarthGrains, Entenmann's, Eureka! Baking Company, Francisco, Freihofer's, Grandma Sycamore’s Homemade Bread, J.J. Nissen, Mrs. Baird's, Old Country, Oroweat, Sara Lee, Stroehmann's, Thomas', Tía Rosa, Weber's
- Bond Bread
- Bost's Bread
- Boudin Bakery
- Davidovich Bagels
- Flowers Foods -- Barowsky's, Bubba's, Butternut, Canyon Bakehouse, Captain John Derst, Country Kitchen, Dave's Killer Bread, European Bakers, Evangeline Maid, Great Grains, Home Pride, Merita, Nature's Own, and Wonder Bread breads.
- Franz Bread
- Holsum Bread
- Hovis
- King's Hawaiian
- Kingsmill
- Lender's Bagels
- it:Mulino Bianco
- Nature's Pride
- Pepperidge Farm
- Polarbröd
- Schmidt Baking Company
- Schwebel's Bakery
- Sunbeam Bread
- Tip Top Bakeries
- VitBe
- Warburtons
- Wibs

== See also ==
- Brand name
- List of baked goods
- List of bakeries
- List of breads
- List of food companies
