= M. H. Ross =

Myron Howard “Mike” Ross (9 November 1918 – 31 January 1987) was a union organizer, Progressive Party candidate, and public health administrator.

== Early life ==
Mike Ross was born in New York City in 1918 to Jewish immigrants from Poland. His father was a fabric cutter, but found difficulty getting work during the Great Depression. By the age of 12, Ross was working two summer jobs to help support his parents and younger brother.

Ross dropped out of City College of New York at the age of 18 and traveled to Dallas, Texas where he worked a summer job for the Mayflower Doughnut Corporation as part of the Greater Texas & Pan-American Exposition. While in Dallas, he began attending meetings of the Unemployed Councils in Texas, where he was introduced to various political beliefs, including Communism and Socialism.

== Labor Union Work ==
In early 1938, Ross got a job operating a boiler for an egg processing plant in Chickasha, Oklahoma. During this time, he was introduced to unions and organizing. After writing to a newly formed union chapter inquiring about organizing his coworkers, he received a personal visit at his boarding house from David Fowler, district president of the United Mine Workers of America (UMWA) and the director of the Oklahoma-Arkansas chapter of the Congress of Industrial Organizations (CIO). Before having a chance to organize workers at the plant, he was fired.

Ross returned to Dallas to work on the chicken farm of a friend in exchange for room and board but soon after received a full scholarship to attend the Southern Summer School for Workers in Asheville, North Carolina, for the summer of 1938. He returned the next year as an assistant, along with his future wife Anne “Buddie” West.

By 1941, while working for the Merita Bakery Plant, Ross was a field representative for UMWA and also a member of the American Federation of Labor (AFL). His’ official duties included gaining signatures from workers for review by the National Labor Relations Board (NLRB) for union representation, designing and printing labor leaflets, and collective bargaining on behalf of workers of various plants.

In Fall of 1941, Ross was organizing workers of the Mathieson Alkali Works in Saltville, Virginia when two representatives working in Tennessee, Homer Wilson of Mine, Mill and Smelters Workers (MMSW) and Oscar Wiles of UMWA, were kidnapped at gunpoint, brutally beaten, stripped naked, and drenched in hot tar by anti-labor locals. Ross was among few volunteers to go to Rockwood, Tennessee in their place. Under cover of night, armed workers protected Ross and fellow local laborers as they met in secret locations to prepare for a labor board election for Tennessee Products Corporation. These efforts proved successful, and in January 1942, the Roane County Smelter Workers Union Local 579 won their election. A victory parade was held the following April.

From 1941 through 1943, Ross traveled throughout the South working as a labor representative. In Alabama, both Mike and Anne Ross worked to gain rights for union workers and to end racial discrimination within industrial work there. Mike Ross sat on the War Production boards of both Tennessee and Alabama, and in Bessemer, Alabama, he taught racial and gender-integrated classes to local union members and auxiliaries on economics, parliamentary law, and the history of unions. In 1942, in accordance with local custom at the time, Anne Ross created a segregated ladies’ auxiliary with the purpose of distributing fliers in Birmingham, Alabama in support of the Roosevelt Administration’s Fair Employment Practice Committee (FEPC).

Organizers of the CIO, MMSW, and UMW faced significant hostility from white supremacists in local business and government in attempting to desegregate industrial labor in Alabama, where government officials openly opposed Roosevelt’s anti-discriminatory Executive Order 8802 and the resultant Fair Employment Practices Committee (FEPC). Because of the unions’ anti-discrimination stance and public support of the FEPC, several representatives in Alabama received threats and were physically assaulted, including Mike Ross, who initially received a threatening note. Mike Ross and his pregnant wife finally left Alabama for Tennessee after their apartment was ransacked in 1942.

From 1943 through 1945, Ross served as a rifleman in the 406th Infantry Regiment in Germany but was discharged after receiving disabling injuries in Germany. Upon his release, he returned as a field representative of MMSW and joined the Operation Dixie labor campaign. In 1946, Ross and an African American MMSW International Representative named Frank Allen were sent to Macon, Georgia to help workers of small local plants organize NLRB elections and to end discriminatory practices among businesses and labor unions in the region.

When Ross, his wife, and child stepped off the bus in Macon, Mike Ross interrupted the beating of an African American teenager by a local policeman. Although this act earned him a positive reputation among the local African American community, it also drew attention from the Ku Klux Klan, which opposed much of the union recruitment in the South. During his few months in Macon, Ross was able to recruit 1,000 workers from 18 plants into MMSW and he continued to be a vocal advocate for racial integration and equality. Immediately after the Moore’s Ford Lynching in nearby Walton County, Georgia, Ross and the CIO reached out to the US Attorney General and President Truman requesting a federal investigation into the lynching and protection for union representatives in the area.

When the Rosses moved to Macon, they first took up residence in a motel room and then were able to secure a small cottage for rent. Knowing of Mike Ross’ intentions in the area, the landlord instructed the Rosses that when—not if—the Klan arrived, they could throw their young daughter out of the window into bushes for safety. Threats were so great that fellow union members would often sleep at the Ross home, armed for safety. One night in August 1946, a pregnant Anne Ross was met at the door by 25 hooded Klansmen who came to the family home with the intention of lynching Mike Ross. After searching the home, they warned Mrs. Ross that they would kill her husband if he did not leave the state. Anne Ross was hospitalized with hysteria and the family left the state soon after for High Point, North Carolina, where Mike Ross began work as an arbitrator with the United Furniture Workers.

== Political life ==
In 1939, Ross began a grant-funded position with John L. Lewis’ Labor’s Non-Partisan League in North Carolina, continuing through 1941. He Ross was Assistant Secretary of the North Carolina chapter of the League for Progressive Democracy and the Vice-Chairman of the League for Young Southerners. In 1941, when 22 years old, he ran for City Council in Charlotte, North Carolina on the “People’s Platform,” or “People’s Slate,” a progressive third party of laborers from multiple industries. Although he received enough votes for the run-off, he lost the election.

In 1948, Ross was Secretary of the North Carolina Progressive Party, was among the 74-member committee in support of Progressive Party presidential candidate Henry A. Wallace, and accompanied Wallace on his presidential election tour of 1948. That year, Ross ran for Congress from the 6th District of North Carolina on the Progressive Party ticket but was defeated.

== Legal career ==
From 1949-1952, Ross attended University of North Carolina School of Law. He was Associate Editor of the North Carolina Law Review and wrote several law articles pertaining to labor, including “Employer Refusals to Bargain Collectively in the Southern Textile Industry,” (1950) and “The Operation of the Wage and Hour Law in North Carolina and the South,” (1952).

Despite graduating at the top of his class, receiving praise from the law school dean, and having a wealth of professional references, the North Carolina State Board of Bar Examiners refused to allow Ross to take the bar exam based on his character, giving the justification that Ross practiced law unlawfully while working as a union arbitrator. The Board refused to offer further explanation, despite public and media outcry and letters written by the North Carolina CIO director to the law school dean, university president, and North Carolina governor. Ross himself stated that the bulk of his three-hour hearing involved questions about his labor activities, whether he was a Communist, and his religious beliefs. It was also speculated that he was refused the bar based on his vocal opposition to racial discrimination and his public support of African-American law school peers. He was never allowed to take the bar or practice law.

== Health Administration ==
Ross dedicated the last thirty years of his life to healthcare administration and to the history, experiences, and well-being of coal miners. From 1958 through the 1970s, he was Executive Officer of the Monongahela Valley Association of Health Centers and served as administrator of the Fairmont Clinic, which began as a non-profit group practice to serve the needs of Marion County, West Virginia miners and their families in Fairmont, West Virginia. He was a member of the West Virginia Task Force on Health Maintenance Organization Legislation in 1973, a member of the Board of Directors of Group Health Associations of America, Vice Chairman of the West Virginia Planning Commission for Nursing, and Chairman of the Health Commission of the Council of Southern Mountains (1969-1973).

Ross served as a lecturer in the University of Pittsburgh Graduate School of Public Health and as a lecturer for Fairmont State College, where he taught a course, “Coal: The People, The Problems and the Future,” and provided a tour of a deep mine for students in 1975. He was also Associate Director of the Rural Practice Project in the School of Medicine, University of North Carolina, Chapel Hill.

On June 17, 1970, Ross gave a speech at the National Conference on Medicine and the Federal Coal Mine Health and Safety Act in Washington D.C. titled “The Life Style of the Coal Miner,” which was reprinted by Appalachia Medicine, the West Virginia University Magazine, and others. His “The Appalachian Coal Miner: his Way of Living, Working and Relating to Others,” first appeared in the December 29, 1972 issue of Annals of the New York Academy of Sciences. In July 1974, Ross gave the keynote address “Rural Health Care: The Prepayment Alternative,” for the National Conference on Rural Health Maintenance Organizations in Louisville, Kentucky, sponsored by the Group Health Association of America.

Ross was working on a manuscript about the history of coal mining when he died in 1987 in North Carolina.

== Publications by M. H. Ross ==
- “North Carolina Labor History” in (Winston-Salem) Industrial Leader, June 1945
- “Employer Refusals to Bargain in Southern Textile Industry,” North Carolina Law Review Vol. 29, No. 1, December 1, 1950, pp 81–89
- “The Operation of the Wage and Hour Law in North Carolina and the South” North Carolina Law Review, Vol. 30, No. 3, April 1, 1952, 248-274
- “A Tar Heel Labor Tradition” in North Carolina Federationist (AFL), June 1952
- “Court Decisions Involving Trade Unions in North Carolina: A Bibliography,” The North Carolina Historical Review, Vol. 30, No. 4, October 1953, 467-482
- “Labor in the South,” The Nation, July 7, 1956
- “The Life Style of the Coal Miner,” Appalachia Medicine, March 1971
- “The Appalachian Coal Miner: his Way of Living, Working and Relating to Others,” Annals of the New York Academy of Sciences, Vol. 200, No. 1, December 29, 1972, 184-196
