= Davidovich Bagels =

New York-based bagel company

- Company type: Private
- Industry: Food industry
- Founded: 1998
- Founder: Gene Davidovich
- Headquarters: New York City, New York, United States
- Area served: United States
- Key people: Gene Davidovich (CEO)
- Products: Bagels
- Parent: All Natural Products Inc.

Davidovich Bagels is a popular bagel brand produced by Davidovich Bakery, a wholesale company in New York City. It is widely regarded as the only genuinely "hand-rolled" bagel on the wholesale market. While the 20th century saw a universal move by bagel companies towards the machine-automated forming of bagels, Davidovich continued to employ artisans to handcraft and kettle-boil bagels in the Viennese tradition. This practice was popularized in New York bakeries as New York City emerged as the bagel-making capital of the world.

This adherence to the labor-intensive craft of making bagels, while even the most popularly identified brands of bagels have automated the process, has become their mark of distinction in the industry. Additionally they continue to use the kettle boiling process as well as turning the bagels by hand on wooden planks in old-fashioned stoves designed in the 1950s, another traditional practice which has been widely eliminated due to cost of labor.

The business was started in 1998 when the founders were trying to locate a genuinely hand-rolled bagel and discovered that one did not exist in New York wholesale market. They outlined and executed a business plan founded on the concept that the most discriminating bagel consumer would understand and would be able to identify the distinction between a traditional bagel and the automated variety. In 2011 Davidovich Bakery joined the All Natural Products Inc. family, which includes such artisan bakers as The Bakery of New York and NY Artisan Bakers.

Davidovich Bagels are certified Kosher and Pareve by OK, one of the nation's largest certifying organizations. The company's main bakery is currently in Woodside, New York. The company's yellow box trucks bearing their corporate slogan "All other bagels wish they were a Davidovich Bagel too!" can often be seen in the early morning hours making deliveries throughout New York City.

The onset of 2012 found the artisan techniques employed by the Davidovich Bakery being featured in stories in The Wall Street Journal and on ABC News.

On Saturday, January 5, 2013, The History Channel premiered a documentary entitled 101 Fast Foods That Changed The World. This program ranked the Bagel as the #12 most significant portable, or "Fast" food and recognized Davidovich Bagels as being the modern link to this traditional, iconic product. CEO Gene Davidovich was prominently featured in this program for his expertise in Bagel history and Artisan techniques.

October 10, 2013, marked the grand opening of the company's first corporate-owned retail Davidovich NYC Bagel store in the historic Essex Street Market.

On December 9, 2013 the Davidovich Bagels' artisan process was featured on the popular Travel Channel program, Bizarre Foods with Andrew Zimmern.

On November 3, 2015 it was announced that Davidovich would be opening a new retail location in the Chelsea Market in early 2016.

In August 2018 Davidovich launched a serial, short form talk show, called Bagel Talk. This interview program, set in the backdrop of the Essex Street Market, features notable guests from the world of Artisan baking, New York City history and politics, and social issues associated with New York City's food and culture.

On November 20, 2021 Comedian Pete Davidson's music video, "Walking in Staten Island", on Saturday Night Live's seventh episode of season 47 featured Davidovich Bagels as part of the skit.

== See also ==
- List of brand name breads
