= Nature's Pride =

Brand of bread

Nature's Pride is an all-natural brand of bread produced by Flowers Foods in the United States. It was previously produced by Hostess Brands, which closed its operations in the wake of a BCTGM bakers' union strike and entered liquidation proceedings. Flowers Foods made a bid to Hostess for the brand on January 11, 2013.

== Background ==
Launched in February 2009, Nature's Pride bread was the first completely all natural line of bread to be available across the United States. The brand offered a number of bread products, including Nature's Pride hearty wide pan and traditional sandwich bread varieties, Nature's Pride OvenClassics and Nature's Pride Premium Harvest buns and rolls.

All Nature's Pride's products were baked using 100% natural ingredients and contained no artificial preservatives, colors, flavors, trans fats or high fructose corn syrup.

== Marketing ==
The brand launched a new television and print advertising campaign in September 2010 highlighting Nature's Pride's all natural ingredients.

Nature's Pride Bread received several awards and recognition for its great taste in a number of publications. In 2009, Nature's Pride was named the "Best Sliced Bread" by Fitness Magazine. In its March 2010 issue, Consumer Reports reported that Nature's Pride Healthy Multi-Grain bread "is excellent and tasty enough to eat plain". Additionally, Everyday with Rachael Ray Magazine chose Nature's Pride Country White Bread as the best tasting white bread in its "Best Sandwich Bread" taste test. Results appeared in the September 2010 issue.

Nature's Pride Bread was featured in a segment on the Food Network's "Unwrapped" series which first aired September 20, 2010. The segment, which ran as part of the show's "Sandwiched" episode, featured the production process for the 100% natural bread brand.

Nature's Pride Bread participated in a number of high-profile events across the country in 2009 and 2010, including the FOOD & WINE Classic in Aspen (2010), the San Diego Bay Wine & Food Festival (2010), Foodbuzz Blogger Festival (2009 and 2010). Nature's Pride Bread was also featured in the 2010 House Beautiful Magazine Kitchen of the Year in Rockefeller Center. Natures Pride Bread is now defunct

== See also ==
- List of brand name breads
