= Wonder Bread =

Brand of pre-sliced bread

- The logo of Wonder Bread.
- Product type: Sliced bread
- Current owner: Flowers Foods
- Country: U.S.
- Introduced: May 21, 1921; 105 years ago
- Markets: United States
- Previous owners: Taggart Baking Company (1921–1925); Continental Baking Company (1925–1995); Interstate Bakeries Corporation (1995–2012)
- Website: wonderbread.com

Wonder Bread is an American brand of sliced bread. Established in Indianapolis, Indiana, in 1921, it was one of the first companies to sell sliced bread nationwide by 1930. The brand is currently owned by Flowers Foods in the United States.

== History ==
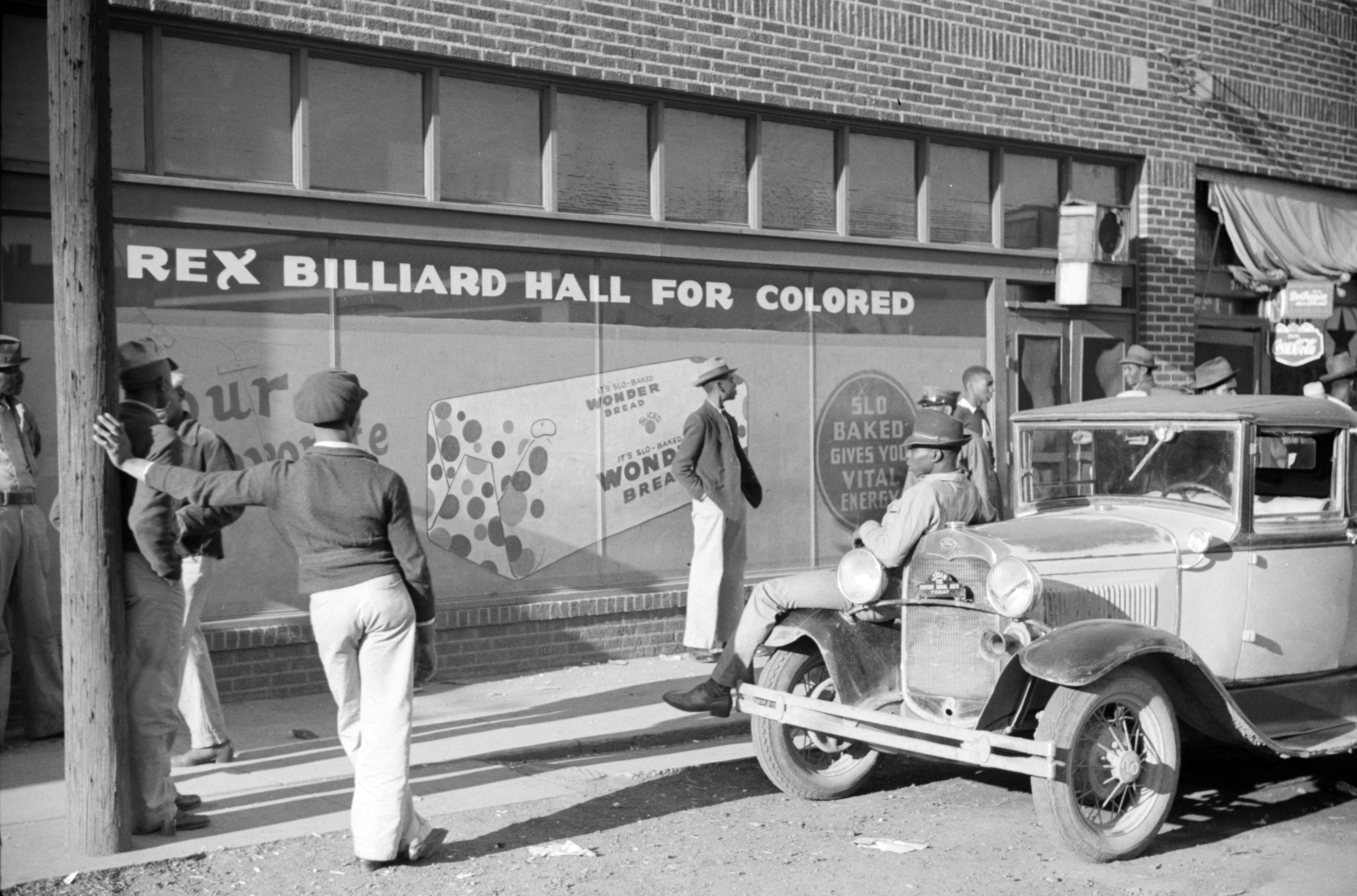
A Wonder Bread advertisement at Beale Street, Memphis, Tennessee, 1939

=== Taggart Baking Company ===
The Taggart Baking Company of Indianapolis, Indiana, began producing Wonder Bread that debuted on May 21, 1921, following a blind promotion with ads that only stated a "Wonder" was coming on that date. The brand was named by vice president for merchandising development Elmer Cline, who was inspired by the International Balloon Race at the Indianapolis Motor Speedway. Cline was filled with "wonder" by the scene of hundreds of balloons creating a kaleidoscope of color resulting in the iconic red, yellow and blue balloons featured on the Wonder Bread logo. The logo was designed by commercial artist Drew Miller while he was on staff at a Chicago ad agency.

=== Continental Baking Company ===
Continental Baking Company purchased Taggart in 1925. This made Wonder Bread a national brand and added "It's Slo Baked" to the logo. In the 1930s, Continental Baking began marketing Wonder Bread in sliced form nationwide, one of the first companies to do so; this was a significant milestone for the industry and for American consumers, who, at first, needed reassurance that "wonder-cut" bread would not dry out. The W. E. Long Company of Chicago, which had formed a cooperative of bakeries to market Holsum Bread, had pioneered and promoted the packaging of sliced bread two years prior, in 1928.

Wonder Bakery Exhibit, in The Food Zone, 1939 New York World's Fair by Continental Baking Company had a wheat field, the first in 68 years, in New York City.

Unsliced bread returned for a period during World War II due to an industry-wide slicing suspension in 1943. Bread slicers returned two months later.

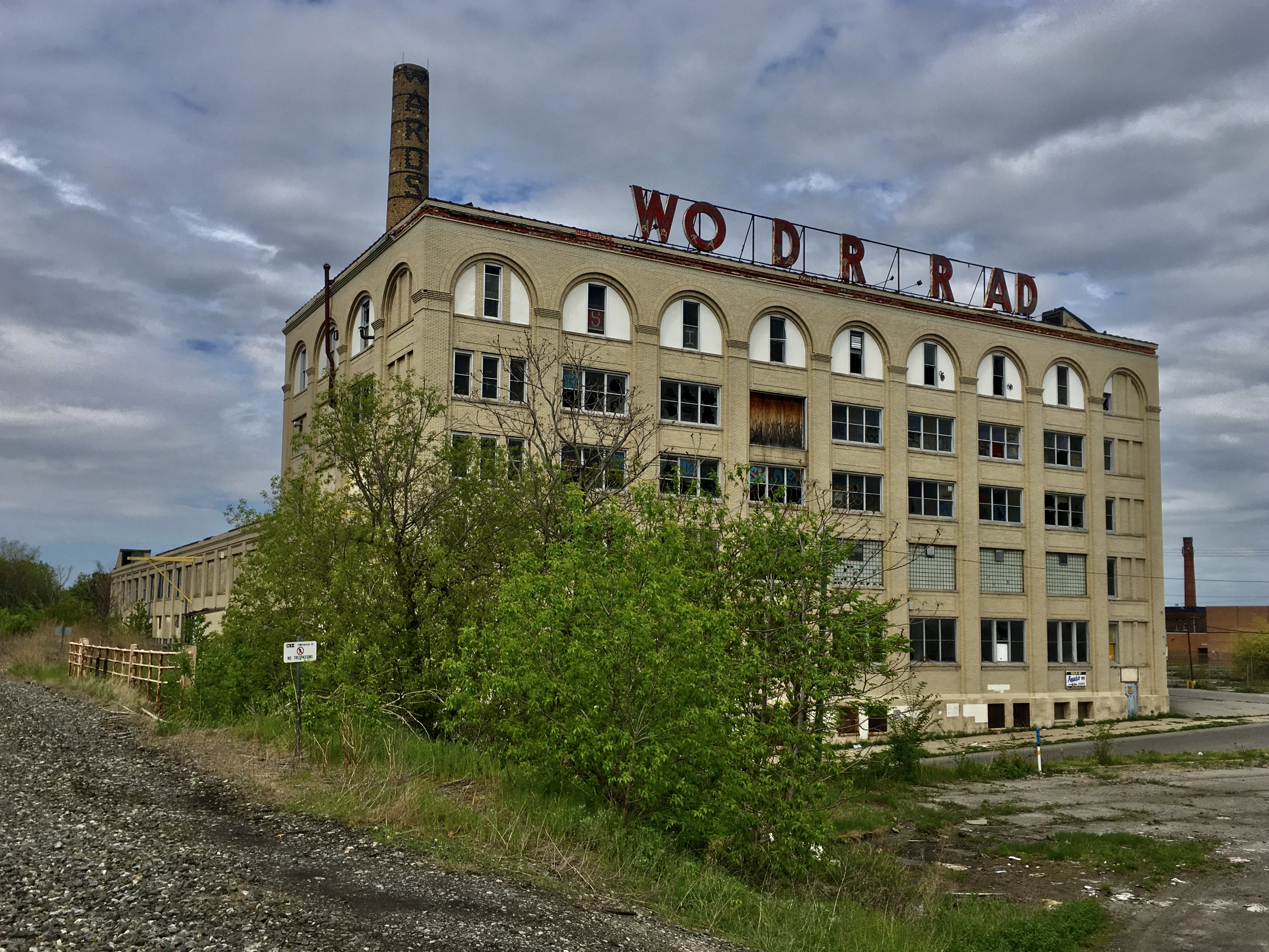
Former Wonder Bread factory in Buffalo, New York, pictured in May 2020

During the 1940s, Continental Baking began adding vitamins and minerals to Wonder Bread as part of a government-sponsored program of enriching white bread, which was notoriously deficient in vitamin and mineral content, to combat certain diseases. Wonder was also the first national bread brand to feature open dating and nutrition information on its packaging. In the 1950s, Wonder Bread further expanded advertising of its nutrient enrichments. The company sponsored Howdy Doody, with host Buffalo Bob Smith telling the audience, "Wonder Bread builds strong bodies 8 ways" referring to the number of added nutrients. By the 1960s, Wonder Bread was advertised with the slogan "Helps build strong bodies 12 ways," with a list of health claims. In 1986, Continental introduced the lower-calorie Wonder Light bread.

=== Interstate Bakeries/Hostess Brands ===
Interstate Bakeries Corporation purchased Continental Baking in 1995. In 2004, Interstate Bakeries declared bankruptcy, putting the future of Wonder Bread in some doubt. In February 2009 Interstate Bakeries emerged from bankruptcy marking a "new beginning" for the baking company.

In 2006, Wonder was one of the first bread brands to introduce whole grain white breads in an effort to appeal to consumers who loved the taste of white bread, but were looking for more nutrition. These breads were made with an albino wheat variety that does not have the more pronounced taste of whole red-wheat flour.

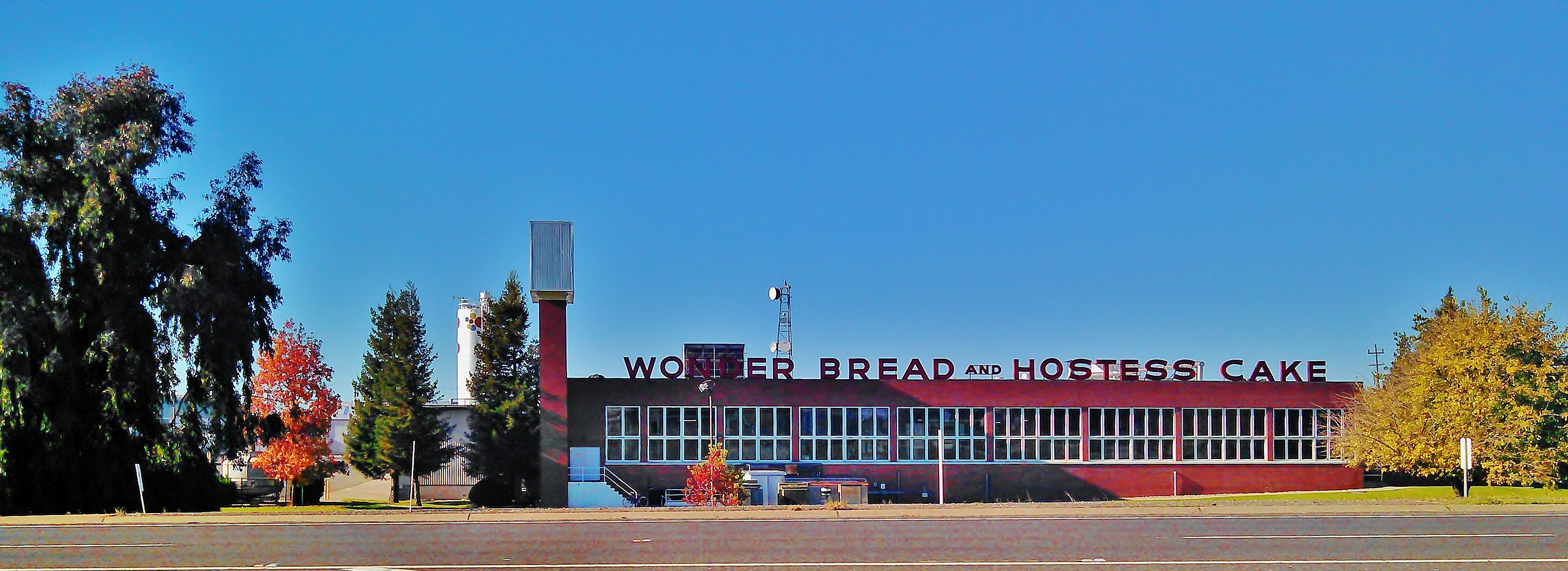
Bakery in Sacramento, California, 2012

On August 28, 2007, Interstate Bakeries announced it would soon end production of Wonder Bread in the Southern California market, leading to a loss of 1,300 jobs. This was due to a decline in sales, as Southern Californians in particular were partial to whole-grain breads and "premium" loaves. As of September 2009, Wonder Bread and other Hostess Brands breads, such as Home Pride, returned to Southern California supermarkets in response to significant consumer demand. In connection with the re-introduction, the company donated thousands of loaves of bread to the San Diego Food Bank and the Los Angeles Regional Food Bank.

In August 2009, Wonder reformulated its Wonder Classic and Wonder Classic Sandwich bread varieties to include more calcium and vitamin D. Two slices of Wonder Classic and Wonder Classic Sandwich bread then provided 30% of the daily recommended intake of calcium, the same amount as 8 fluid ounces of whole milk. Wonder 100% Whole Wheat (16 oz variety) qualified for the Women, Infants and Children or WIC program in most states. In November 2009, IBC changed its name to Hostess Brands.

In March 2010, Wonder extended its line of bread products with Wonder Smartwhite, which had the taste and soft texture of white bread, but the fiber of 100% whole wheat bread. In 2011, Wonder bread launched its first national advertising campaign in years, titled "Always Wonder".

On November 16, 2012, Hostess Brands (Old HB) filed a motion in United States Bankruptcy Court for the Southern District of New York seeking permission to close its business and sell its assets under Chapter 11. The company closed plants and began liquidation proceedings, temporarily ending production of Wonder Bread in the states.

=== Flowers Foods ===
Flowers Foods, owner of the Mrs. Freshley's, Tastykake, and Dave's Killer Bread brands, officially acquired Hostess' bread brands, including Wonder Bread, in March 2013. On July 22, 2013, Flowers Foods completed its $355 million acquisition of several breads, bakeries and other assets from the company previously known as Hostess Brands (Old HB), including Wonder Bread. Flowers Foods announced on September 12, 2013, that Wonder Bread would return to U.S. store shelves, with delivery of Wonder Bread to stores resuming on September 23.

== In other countries ==
=== Mexico ===
Wonder Bread was produced in Mexico by Grupo Bimbo, the largest baking company in the world. Grupo Bimbo acquired the Mexican rights to the brand and factories in 1986 when it purchased the Mexican subsidiary of Continental Baking Company.

In 2013, Grupo Bimbo lost in their bid to acquire Hostess bread brands, including Wonder Bread (U.S.), to Flowers Foods during the liquidation of Hostess Brands (Old HB).

=== Canada ===
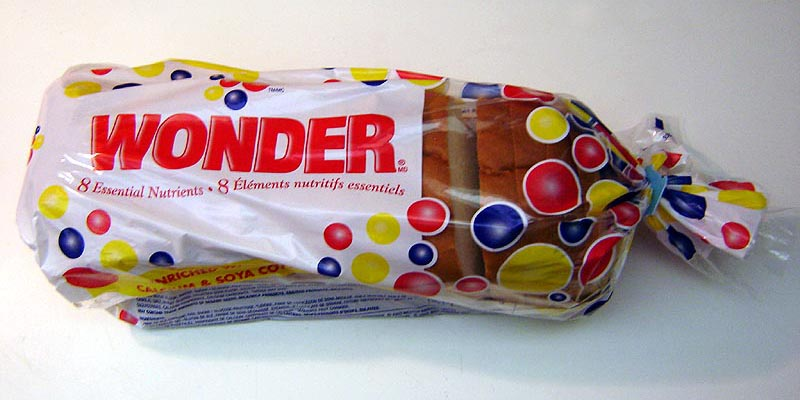
Wonder Bread in its former Canadian packaging

Wonder Bread in Canada was launched by Northern Bakeries Limited, a corporation formed in 1925 by merging six bakeries located across the country and immediately acquired by Continental Bakeries as its Canadian subsidiary. However, Northern Bakeries was taken back into Canadian ownership shortly after Wonder Bread began appearing on Canadian grocery shelves and home delivery routes in March 1927 in Montreal. In 1928, Northern Bakeries Limited registered the "Wonder" trademark with the Canadian Intellectual Property Office. At the end of that year, it was folded into Consolidated Bakeries Limited, controlled by Ogilvie Flour Mills. In 1930, Wonder arrived in Toronto, baked by Nasmiths Limited (founded 1850, a Consolidated subsidiary since 1928). Newspaper ads proclaimed "Great news for the people of Toronto – it's here at last – the delicious Wonder Bread." Made from unbleached flour and "Slo-Baked," Wonder was said to produce "more slices and thinner slices" when cut, yet would not crumble. By 1934, "Sliced Wonder," an early version of sliced bread, was being promoted by the Ideal Bread Company Limited of Toronto (another subsidiary of Consolidated), with no fewer "than 26 slices in a loaf".

By 1940, Wonder Bakeries Limited had become the maker of Wonder Bread in Canada along with Hostess cakes and cookies, after being set up as a subsidiary of Consolidated Bakeries, although the local subsidiary bakery companies continued to be the actual manufacturers. New products were introduced that included Wonder Melior, "a better white bread with natural wheat vitamins," as well as Wonder Peter Pan Bread, designed to appeal to children. Wonder Bakeries also became the maker of Hollywood Bread, marketed for those "counting calories" and trying to keep their "figure".

In January 1968, General Bakeries Limited took over Consolidated Bakeries, becoming the maker of Wonder. Then, in July 1985, Weston Bakeries Limited, a subsidiary of George Weston Limited, acquired certain Ontario assets of General Bakeries, then owned by Dominion Stores Limited, that included not only bread and roll plants but also the trademark for Wonder in Canada. The Canadian packaging, though not identical to the U.S. version, is very similar.

Between 2000 and 2022, Weston Foods added a number of new Wonder products to the brand's line-up, many of which were designed to appeal to parents and their concern for their children's nutritional needs. In 2011, Weston Bakeries Limited announced that its Wonder Bread brands would henceforth be free of artificial preservatives, artificial colors, or artificial flavors.

In 2022, the brand was sold by Weston Foods to FGF Brands and now operates as Wonder Brands Incorporated.

== See also ==
- List of bakeries
- List of brand name breads
