= Schwebel's Bakery =

American food company

The Schwebel Baking Company
- Type: Private
- Founded: 1906
- Founder: Joseph and Dora Schwebel
- Headquarters: 965 East Midlothian Boulevard; P.O. Box 6018, Youngstown, Ohio, U.S. 44502
- Key people: Paul Schwebel (President); Joseph Winick (Sr VP of Transportation); David Alter (Treasurer and Sr Accountant); Alyson Winick (Sr VP of Sales); Lee Schwebel (VP of Marketing)
- Number of employees: Approximately 1,000

Schwebel's Bakery was a regional producer of bread and other baked goods that was established in Youngstown, Ohio, in the early 20th century.

In June 2026, after 120 years, the Schwebel baking company announced its permanent closure following the Fourth of July weekend. The closure is due to financial issues, aging equipment, and declining demand, with no potential buyers found to salvage the business.

== History ==
The Schwebel's brand was created by Joseph Schwebel and Dora Schwebel, a married couple that started baking bread in the kitchen of their Campbell, Ohio, home, in 1906. The Schwebels eventually began to sell bread to customers in nearby Youngstown, an event which marks the official beginning of the Schwebel's Bakery. In 1914, Dora and Joseph entered the world of retail sales by working out agreements with several local "mom and pop" stores – a move that opened up new and more profitable sales channels for their fledgling business. To ensure that fresh bread was in the stores when customers asked for it, the young couple added more bakers to assist the family. Eventually, Schwebel's expanded its distribution to areas beyond Youngstown and relied on horses and wagons to transport their products.

By 1923, Schwebel's secured its first fleet of trucks, with six vehicles on hand. That same year the Schwebel's invested $25,000 and built a small bakery complete with a store front for retail business. At this time, the family could bake and deliver 1,000 loaves a day using six delivery trucks. The bakery was improving but in the 1920s and 1930s the company had a temporary downfall.

=== Crisis and renewal ===
Dora Schwebel faced many challenges during the late 1920s and 1930s. In 1928, Joseph Schwebel died suddenly at the age of 46 – leaving Dora with six children and the family's business to run by herself.

In 1928, many people believed the baking business was no place for a woman with young children. Dora Schwebel was told she should sell her bakery and stay home with her children, but she still kept the company, trying to continue the business she and her husband started. The stock market crashed in the fall of 1929, less than a year after Joseph Schwebel's passing, and Dora and her young family found out just how difficult running a business could be.

Vowing to meet her obligations by working all day and all night if necessary, Dora negotiated a number of critical agreements that kept the business running in the face of national financial ruin. She built a new bakery in 1936 that doubled production and improved efficiency, and added to it in 1938 and again in 1941.

By the late 1940s, demand for the company's products was growing by leaps and bounds as soldiers returned home from World War II and the baby boom began.

==== 1950s and 60s ====
In 1951, Dora and her children moved into a new facility on Youngstown's Midlothian Boulevard, outfitted with equipment and baking processes that would significantly help the business.

The 1960s marked the beginning of the third generation's active participation in the company. Their entry would add vitality, new ideas, and a quest for rapid growth and expansion outside of Youngstown. In 1967, the popularity of Schwebel's Golden Rich Bread led to a successful national licensing program throughout the country.

==== Expansion ====
By the end of the 1970s, the company had noticeably expanded its distribution network. In rapid fashion, Schwebel's had now become a key player in the Cleveland, Canton, Ohio and Pittsburgh markets. In addition, the company had undertaken a significant bakery expansion program that fully automated the bread and buns lines, doubling capacity.

Record growth characterized the 1980s and 1990s. As a result of several key acquisitions, Schwebel's had become a regional force in the baking industry. To complement this expansion the company added distribution facilities in Columbus and Buffalo. This period also heralded special baking agreements with Stouffer Corporation, Pillsbury Company, and Disney's Epcot theme park.

=== Closures ===
Schwebel's closed its plant in Cuyahoga Falls in 2013 and shifted some of the production there to its Solon, Ohio plant. The company closed its bakery outlet stores in Austintown and Warren in January 2019, and its outlet in Meadville, Pennsylvania in November 2018. On March 18, 2019, Schwebel's announced it would close its bakery in Solon and cut 204 jobs in May 2019. This would leave the company with approximately one thousand employees. On June 17, 2026, Schwebel's announced they would be winding down their operations and shutting down throughout the remainder of the summer, beginning after the weekend of July 4.

== See also ==
- List of bakeries
- List of brand name breads
