= Schwan's Company =

American food company

- Type: Subsidiary
- Industry: Frozen food
- Founded: 1952; 74 years ago
- Founder: Marvin Schwan
- Headquarters: Marshall, Minnesota, U.S.
- Revenue: $3.0 billion
- Number of employees: 8,500
- Parent: CJ CheilJedang (80%)
- Website: www.schwanscompany.com

Schwan's Company, formerly known as The Schwan Food Company, is a food company with approximately 8,500 employees. It originated in the United States as a family-owned business and in 2019 became a subsidiary of CJ CheilJedang of South Korea.

Schwan's Company's former subsidiary, Schwan's Home Service, rebranded as Yelloh in 2022, remained a privately held, independent entity owned and operated by the Schwan family. Yelloh, which traced back to the Schwan's home delivery business launched by Marvin Schwan in 1952, sold frozen foods from home delivery trucks, in 13 states. In November 2024, it shut down its operations.

Schwan's Company continues to be widely known for its consumer brands, including Freschetta Pizza, Tony's Frozen Pizza, Mrs. Smith's Pies, Edwards Frozen Pies, Pagoda Egg Rolls, and Red Baron Pizza. The company also sells products to the food-service industry.

== Corporate divisions ==
The company, as a subsidiary of CJ CheilJedang, has the following major business units:

- Schwan's Consumer Brands markets frozen food products in grocery stores primarily in the Western Hemisphere.
- Schwan's Food Service markets and distributes frozen-food products to the food service industry.
- SFC Global Supply Chain is a manufacturing cooperative that coordinates the company's production processes and helps develop new products.
- Schwan's Strategic Partner Solutions helps other companies produce and package their products

== Company history ==
In 1952, Marvin Schwan (1929–1993) began home delivery of his family's homemade ice cream (Schwan's Dairy and Dairy Lunch) to rural western Minnesota. Schwan's expanded to cover the Midwestern United States and made a number of acquisitions, including the Holiday Ice Cream Company and Russell Dairy. In 1957, the product line was expanded to include juice concentrates, and in 1962, Schwan's began selling frozen fish products.

During the 1970s, the company began selling pizza to schools, launched the Red Baron pizza brand for sale in grocery stores, and formed the Red Baron Squadron flight team to promote the brand. During the 1980s, Schwan's made further acquisitions, including pizza manufacturer Sabatasso Foods and Asian-foods manufacturer Minh Food Corporation. Schwan's opened a plant in Leyland, Preston, England, in 1989. In 1990, Schwans started Schwans Canada, with an ice cream plant in Manitoba and routes in Saskatchewan and Alberta, but they ceased operations in December 1999.

In 1993, founder Marvin Schwan died of a heart attack at the age of 64. The Marvin Schwan Memorial Drive in Marshall is named after him. His older brother, Alfred Schwan, who had been the company's head of manufacturing, was named president.

In October 1994, the Minnesota Department of Health informed the company that 67 people in southern Minnesota had been infected with salmonella enteritis and that there was a strong statistical link between the illnesses and Schwan's ice cream. Schwan quickly halted the production and sale of the company's ice cream and began a public-awareness campaign asking people not to eat Schwan's ice cream products. An investigation found that the source of the contamination was a contractor's truck that had delivered ice cream pre-mix to Schwan's. The trucking company had inadequately washed the tanker truck after transporting raw, unpasteurized eggs.

In 1996, Schwan's introduced the Freschetta pizza line and acquired La Roue du Pays d'Auge, a frozen foods producer in France. In 1998, Schwan's opened a pizza plant in Osterweddingen, Germany. In 2001, Schwan's acquired the Edwards dessert company from Ripplewood Holdings, and in 2003, the Mrs. Smith's dessert company from Flowers Foods. Also in 2003, the corporation changed its name from Schwan's Sales Enterprises to The Schwan Food Company.

In 2010, Schwan's teamed up with the TV series Top Chef and served dishes that were made famous by chefs that were featured on the Bravo television series.

In February 2019, the company announced it had completed the sale of 80% of the privately held company's stock to CJ CheilJedang of South Korea, effectively ending the Schwan family's control of the company. Most of Schwan's continued to exist as a subsidiary of CJ, but the Schwan family retained 100% of the ownership of Schwan's Home Delivery Service.

In March 2022, Schwan's Home Delivery announced that it was rebranding as Yelloh, a reference to the color of its trucks. As of October 2023, Yelloh has been operated by Cygnus Home Service, LLC, which is independently owned by members of the Schwan family. On September 23, 2024, Yelloh announced that the company would cease operations on November 8, 2024, citing "insurmountable business challenges".
