= Wibs =

Indian bread brand

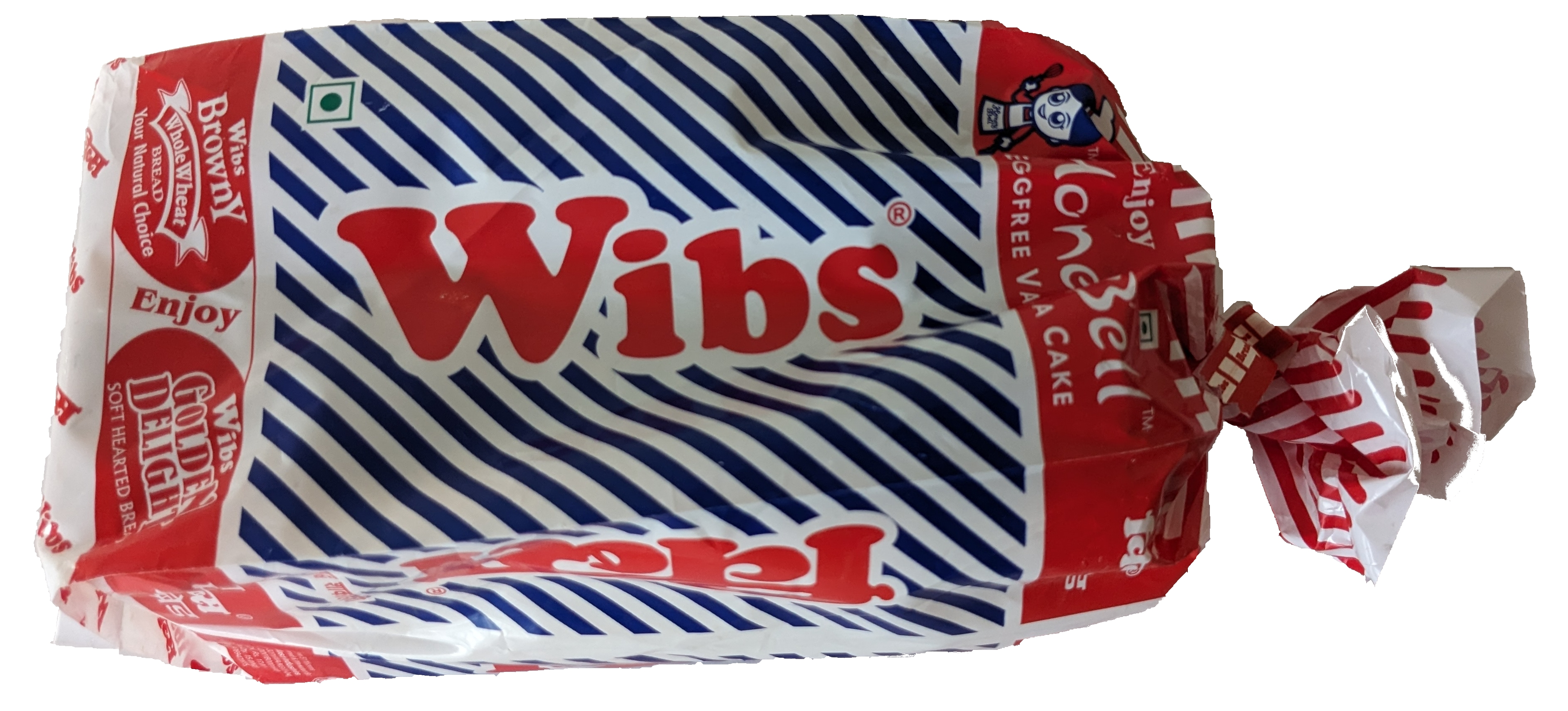
a 400g pack of Wibs white bread

Western India Baker's Association (Wibs) is a brand of bread originated in Mumbai, India in 1973. It has been a staple in many Mumbai households and is especially favored by local sandwich makers. In 2019 it had a 46% market share of Mumbai's sliced bread market.

== Products ==
Wibs makes 4 categories of products: white bread, wholemeal bread, sweet bread, and buns. Its staple product is sliced white bread, which is sold as either 400g loaves wrapped in plastic or 800g loaves wrapped in wax paper.

== See also ==
- List of bakeries
- List of brand name breads
