= Mrs. Smith's =

Brand of frozen pie

- Industry: Frozen food
- Founded: 1925 in Pottstown, Pennsylvania
- Founders: Amanda Smith
- Headquarters: United States
- Parent: Schwan Food Company
- Website: Official site

Mrs. Smith's Pies (a.k.a. Mrs. Smith's Bakeries) is one of the largest frozen pie brands in the United States.

== History ==
The company was founded by Amanda Smith, a homemaker from Pottstown, Pennsylvania. Her son Robert P. started selling slices of Amanda's own deep-dish, fruit-filled pies door-to-door, and at the local YMCA lunch counter. Later he added a mobile route and a small store. The demand for her pies led to the formation of the company "Mrs. Smith's Delicious Home Made Pies, Inc." in 1925. There were four Mrs. Smith's Pies bakeries serving the Northeast United States by 1930, including two bakeries in Pennsylvania: one in York, and one in the Logan neighborhood of Philadelphia. There were also two Mid-Atlantic bakeries located in Silver Spring, Maryland, and Portsmouth, Virginia.

The company began producing frozen pies in 1952, five years after Amanda Smith died. Amanda's grandson Robert C. Smith (d. 2010) held various executive positions at the company before being named president in 1972. The company went public in May 1972.

In 1976, the Kellogg Company purchased Mrs. Smith's Pies for $56 million. Kellogg's sold its bakery division to The J.M. Smucker Co. in 1994 for $84 million. In May 1996, after a deal to sell the unit to ConAgra fell through, Smucker sold it to Flowers Foods. In 2003, the brand was purchased by the Schwan Food Company. The Mrs. Smith's Pies plant in Pottstown, Pennsylvania, served as a landmark and significant employer for the better part of the twentieth century. Today, the plant is used to manufacture Mrs. Smith's pie tins. However, the main pie plant was razed to make way for a residential development. Following the closure of the Pottstown pie facility in 1998, production of Mrs. Smith's pies was relocated to Stilwell, Oklahoma.
