= Dave Dahl (entrepreneur) =

American entrepreneur (born 1963)

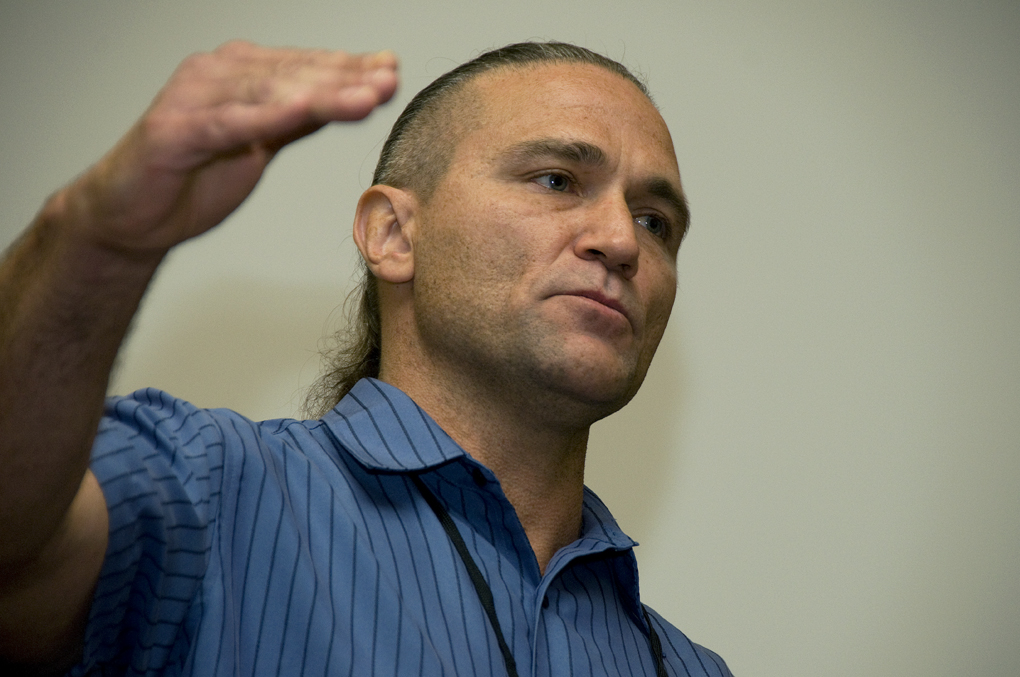
- Dahl in 2008
- Born: January 12, 1963 (age 63); Portland, Oregon, U.S.
- Occupations: Baker; entrepreneur
- Years active: 2005–present
- Known for: Dave's Killer Bread

Dave Dahl (born January 12, 1963) is an American entrepreneur, known for co-founding Dave's Killer Bread.

== Biography ==
Dahl was born in Portland, Oregon. At the age of nine, he began working at his family's bakery, founded in 1955 by his father, James A. "Jim" Dahl. Raised in a Seventh-day Adventist household, he attended private religious schools through his sophomore year of high school. Dahl later became disenchanted with religion and embarked on a journey of drug addiction, crime, and prison.

He spent about 15 years in prison between Oregon, Massachusetts and Wyoming from 1987 to 2004.

In 2001, while incarcerated for his fourth time, he requested help from SRCI Psychiatric Services. He began taking Paxil and shortly after, entered a Computer-Aided Drafting/Design vocational training program at Snake River Correctional Institution. He exceled and continued drafting for the Construction Tech program while tutoring other prisoners in CADD.

In 2003, Dahl was placed in a drug-treatment program (Baker City CI) that resulted in his sentence being reduced from a total of 118 months to 88.

He was released from prison on December 27, 2004. Within a week, he was filling in for absent workers at his family's Naturebake bakery in Northeast Portland.

In August 2005, Dahl and his nephew Shobi took the first loaves of Dave's Killer Bread to Portland Farmers' Market's annual (at the time) artisan bread festival, The Summer Loaf. The bread was an immediate hit. At the time, the back of the bread package featured Dahl's story, self-penned as a caption which began: "I was a four-time loser before I realized I was in the wrong game".

The story and bread soon began to garner significant media attention, making Dahl a sought-after speaker as his bread gained popularity all over the Western US at the time.

Dahl developed a drinking problem, eventually having a bipolar meltdown resulting in "ramming police cruisers" after a slow-speed police chase through a Portland neighborhood in November 2013.

In 2016, Dahl started an organization known as Discover African Art, for which he opened a flagship showroom in Clackamas, Oregon and a boutique in Portland's Pearl District the following year. In June 2017, the organization sent grain shipments to Yélimané, Mali. After eight and a half years in business, Discover African Art announced its closure in August 2024.

As of 2026, Dahl has returned to inspirational speaking occasionally and intends to release an autobiography in 2027.
