= Holsum Bread =

American brand of packaged sliced white bread

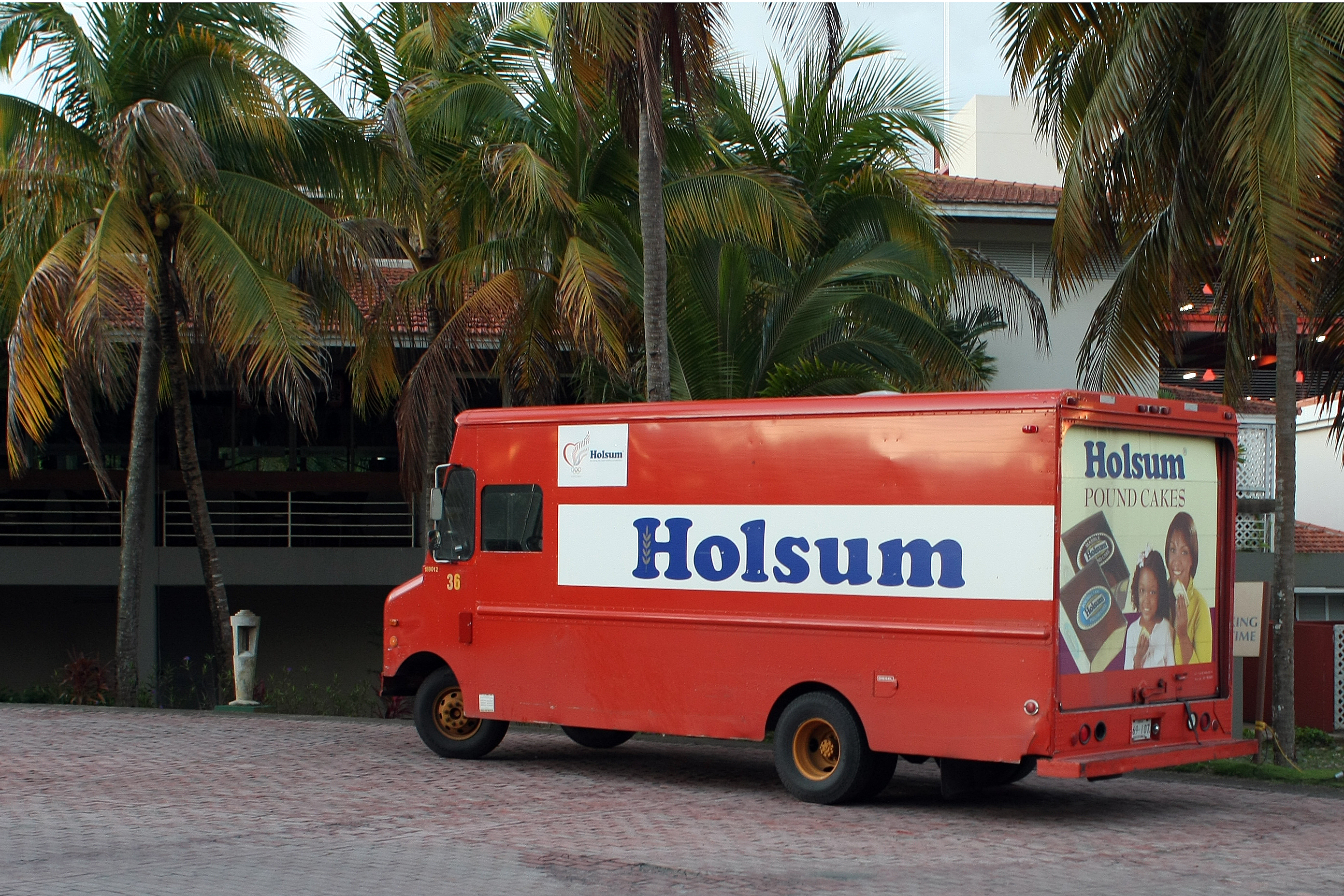
- A Holsum delivery van in Puerto Rico.
- Type: White bread, packaged variety
- Place of origin: United States
- Region or state: Southeast Region, as subsidiary of Flowers Foods, in Thomasville, Georgia, U.S.
- Created by: W. E. Long Company of Chicago, Illinois, 1908

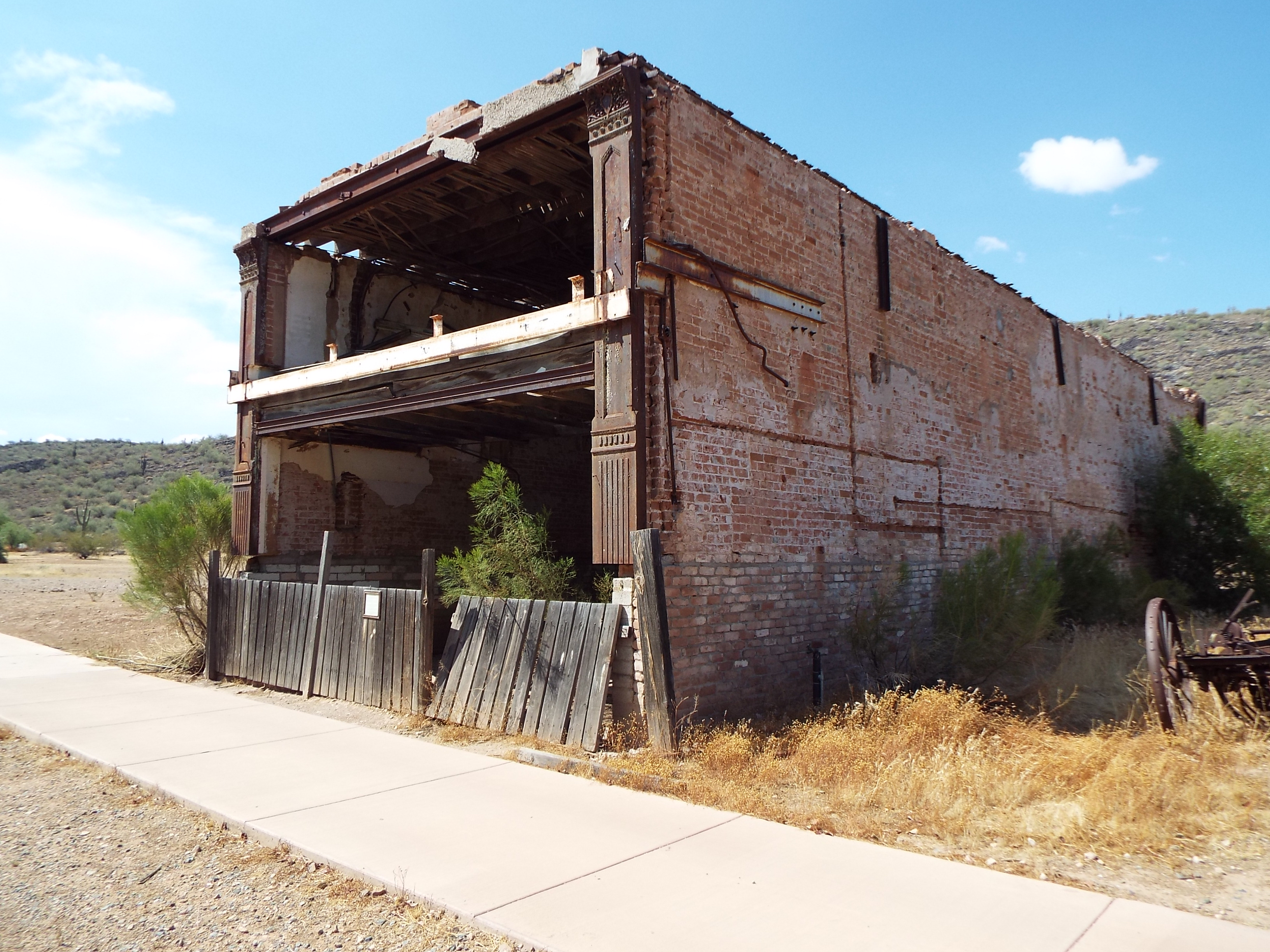
What remains of the historic Phoenix Bakery

Holsum Bread is an American brand of packaged sliced white bread. The Holsum name was being used by many retail bakeries, independently, around the country by the early 1900s. In 1908, the W. E. Long Company of Chicago acquired exclusive national rights to the name and formed a cooperative of bakeries to market a single recipe under the brand name Holsum in various cities.

One of the largest, earliest, and longest-lasting of the Long Company member bakeries was the Phoenix Bakery, which was renamed the Holsum Bakery in 1929 after then owners Lloyd Eisele and Charles Becker purchased from the Long Company the rights to use the Holsum name for their bakery and its bread . Flowers Foods, one of the southern U.S. region distributors, bought Holsum Bakery in 2008.

The Long Company was named after its founder William Edgar Long. In 1928, Long created and pioneered the concept of packaging sliced bread two years before the Wonder brand of packaged sliced bread appeared on store shelves. The Holsum brand name remains a registered trademark of the Long Company cooperative, which has expanded across the United States, Canada, Mexico, and Puerto Rico.

== List of Holsum Bread licensees ==
- Aunt Millie's Bakery
  - Michigan
- Bimbo Bakeries USA
  - Colorado (Sara Lee)
  - Delaware (Butter Krust)
  - Louisiana
  - Maryland (Butter Krust)
  - New Jersey (Butter Krust)
  - New York (Butter Krust)
  - North Carolina (Butter Krust)
  - Pennsylvania (Butter Krust)
  - West Virginia (Butter Krust)
  - Utah (Sara Lee)
  - Virginia (Butter Krust)
- Phoenix Bakery was the forerunner to Holsum Bakery in Phoenix. (See Phoenix Bakery)
  Flowers Foods
  - Alabama
  - Arizona (Holsum Bakery)
  - California (Holsum Bakery)
  - New Mexico (Holsum Bakery)
  - Utah (Holsum Bakery)
- Gold Medal Bakery
  - Connecticut
  - Maine
  - Massachusetts
  - New Hampshire
  - New Jersey
  - New York
  - Rhode Island
  - Vermont
- Holsum De Puerto Rico (Puerto Rico Baking Company)
  - Puerto Rico
- Klosterman Baking Company
  - Kentucky
  - Ohio
- Lewis Bakeries
  - Alabama
  - Georgia
  - Illinois
  - Indiana
  - Mississippi
  - Missouri
  - Ohio
  - South Carolina
  - Tennessee
  - Wisconsin
- Pan-O-Gold Baking Company
  - Minnesota
  - North Dakota
  - South Dakota
  - Wisconsin
  - Iowa
  - Nebraska
  - Illinois
- Schmidt Baking Company
  - Pennsylvania
- United States Bakery
  - Alaska
  - California
  - Idaho
  - Montana
  - Oregon
  - Washington

A former Holsum bakery location in Las Vegas, Nevada, was converted into lofts in 2004

== See also ==
- List of brand name breads
- Luis Aguad Jorge- alias "El enanito de Holsum"
- KCBD, NBC affiliate in Lubbock, Texas which the bakery owned from 1986 to 2000
