= VitBe =

VitBe was a brand of brown bread made in Britain by Allied Mills. It has been suggested that its name derives from bread's Vitamin B content, since bread contains thiamine (B_{1}), and/or from the association with the word vitality.

== See also ==
- List of brand name breads
