= Evangeline Maid =

- Founded: 1919
- Founder: Huval family
- Fate: Acquired
- Headquarters: Thomasville, GA, USA
- Area served: Acadiana
- Products: Sliced white sandwich bread, jumbo buns, jumbo seeded buns, hot dog buns
- Parent: Flowers Foods
- Website: https://www.evangelinemaid.com/

Evangeline Maid is a bread brand in southern Louisiana's Acadiana region. It was founded in 1919 by Joseph Huval in Youngsville, using approximately $50 earned while serving in World War I. In 1926, the business relocated to Lafayette, and by 1937 the “Evangeline Maid” name was adopted.

In 1976, the business was sold to Flowers Foods (then known as Flowers Industries), a large U.S. bakery company, bringing Evangeline Maid under its umbrella while retaining its regional identity.
