= Polarbröd =

Swedish bread company

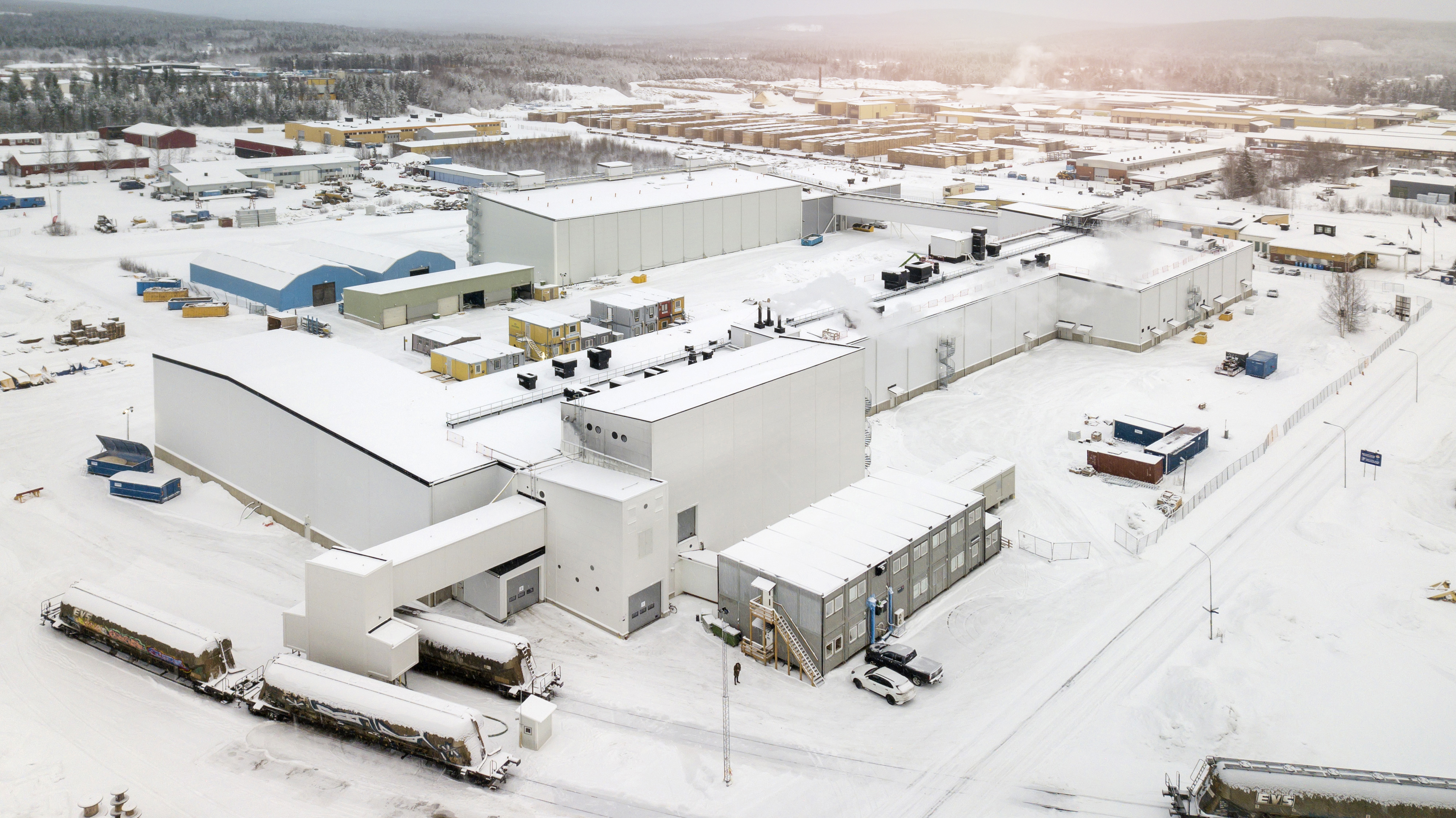
- Industry: Bread Production
- Founded: 1971
- Founder: Gösta and Greta Nilsson
- Headquarters: Älvsbyn, Sweden
- Website: www.polarbrod.se

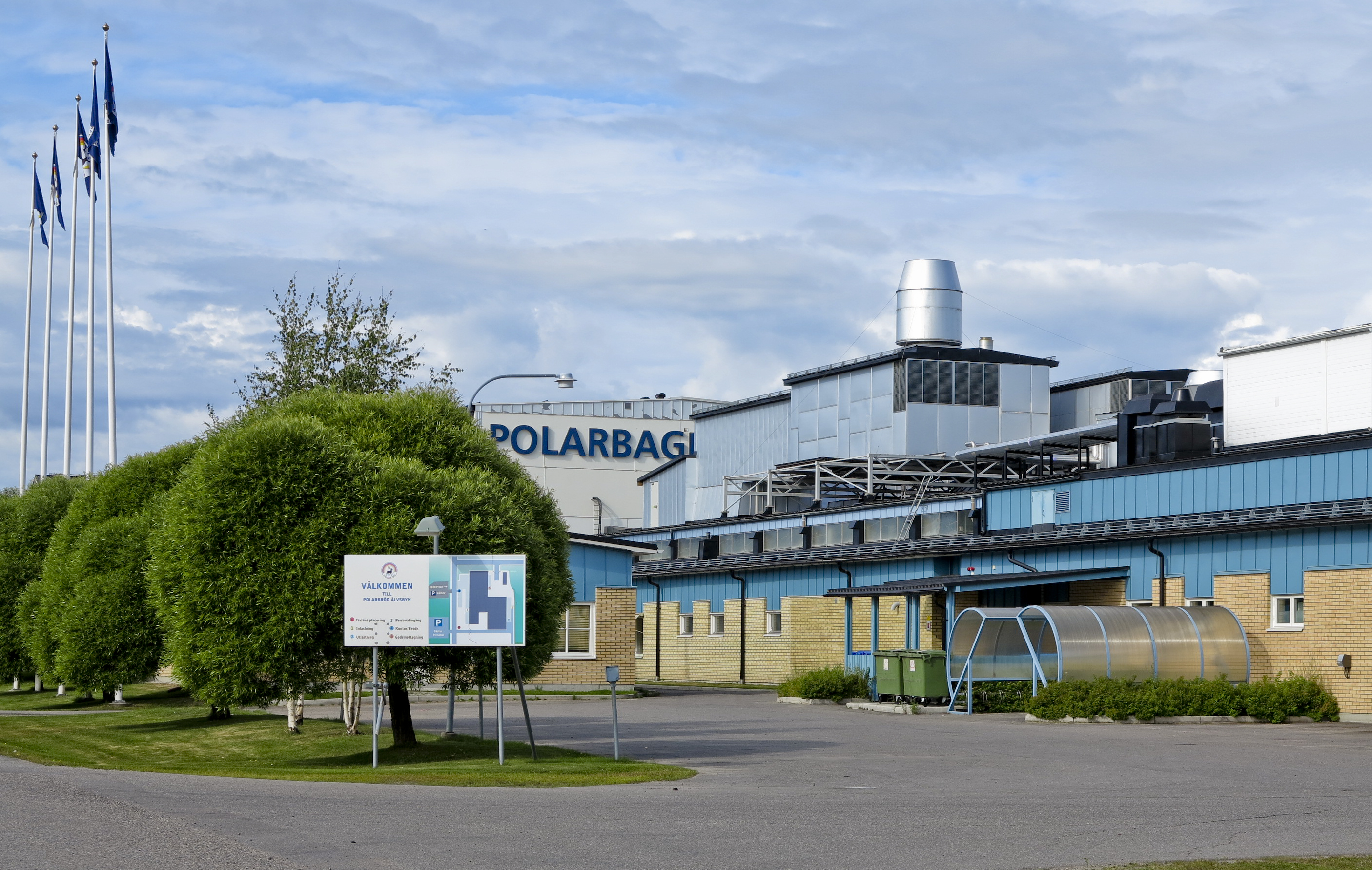
The Polarbröd bakery in Älvsbyn

Polarbröd is a Swedish bread company. Their head office is in Älvsbyn in northern Sweden. Polarbröd is Sweden's third-largest bread company. Its typical product is a soft compact bread formed into round, flat shapes. It is also noted for ready-made sandwiches produced from such bread and reindeer meat, which was introduced as a product in the 1960s, under the name renklämma.

During the evening of 23 August 2020, a fire started in the company's factory in Älvsbyn. The building could not be saved.

== History ==
Polarbröd's business stretches back five generations. In 1878, Johan Nilsson came to Älvsbyn from Gothenburg, after receiving his master's letter in Piteå. Together with his wife Hilda Nordström, he settled in Älvsbyn and began baking bread for the community's inhabitants and water navvies, who built log driving paths in the area. During the construction of the Northern Main Line, the railway navvies also became customers of the bakery. For the first years Johan Nilsson rented the bakery, but bought it in 1885. After the main line was completed in 1893, the navvies disappeared from the area and sales decreased.

After Johan Nilsson's death in 1912, his son Frans Gustav took over the bakery, which was then heavily indebted. In 1926 a new bakery was built and Frans Gustav Nilsson introduced a variant of the local, thin soft cake, which he baked using rye flour mixed with wheat flour, water, salt and yeast. He called it the "Tioöreskakan", as that was the price for it, 10 öre. The bakery was closed down in 1959 and Frans Gustav Nilsson died the following year. His youngest son Gösta Nilsson, together with his wife Greta Stålberg, ran a café in Älvsbyn and after a few years began experimenting with Tioöreskakan and called it Älvsbykaka. His wife Greta spread butter and put smoked reindeer roast on the bread and froze it, to be able to quickly thaw it and serve the guests. She called the sandwich Rågstrut ("rye cone"), but it later became known as Renklämma. Gösta and Greta Nilsson decided to start a special bakery for the soft rye cake, which was then named Polarkaka and the company Polarbageriet AB was formed in 1972.

In 1977, a completely new bakery was inaugurated in Älvsbyn and the business continued to grow during the 1980s and 1990s. The company had passed on in the family and was run by her granddaughter, Karin Bodin.

During the evening of 23 August 2020, a large fire broke out in the bakery in Älvsbyn. The main factory could not be saved. Polarbröd's plan was then to maximize production in its second factory in Bredbyn and use this facility to bake all varieties that were previously only baked in Älvsbyn. According to Polarbröd, a new factory will be built in Älvsbyn as soon as possible.

The bakery was rebuilt and reopened in May 2022 as part of the company’s fiftieth anniversary.

== Factories ==
- Älvsbyn, 223 employees
- Bredbyn, 80 employees
- Nordingrå, 60 employees

== See also ==
- List of bakeries
- List of brand name breads
