= Mrs. Freshley's =

American brand of snack cakes

- Mrs. Freshley's brand logo (1994-Present)
- Product type: Dreamies, Fruit Pies, Pecan Twirls, Honeybuns, Buddy Bars, Swiss Rolls
- Current owner: Flowers Foods, Thomasville, Georgia
- Country: United States
- Introduced: 1994
- Website: mrsfreshleys.com

Mrs. Freshley's is an American brand of snack cakes produced and distributed by Flowers Foods. Varieties of this brand include Honeybuns, Pecan Twirls, Dreamies (similar to the Twinkie), Swiss Rolls, Peanut-butter Wafers (called Buddy Bars, similar to Nutty Bars), Brownies, Creme-filled Cookies, and many more.

== See also ==
- List of brand name snack foods
