= Trustee in bankruptcy =

Entity, often an individual, in charge of administering a bankruptcy estate

A trustee in bankruptcy is an entity, often an individual, in charge of administering a bankruptcy estate.

== Canada ==
In Canada, a licensed insolvency trustee (LIT) is an individual or a corporation licensed by the official superintendent to hold in trust and, subsequently, to distribute a bankrupt's property among the creditors in accordance with the distribution scheme under the Bankruptcy and Insolvency Act (BIA). The bankrupt and all other persons holding bankrupt's property must transfer the property to trustee. The trustee may also assist individual in preparing and submitting a consumer proposal to creditors. The trustee must arrange mandatory counselling of the bankrupt. The trustee must follow the procedures under the BIA, call creditors meetings and send the parties required notices of proceedings and documents. The trustee is responsible for preparation of pre-discharge report and may oppose the bankrupt's discharge.

== Russia ==
To become registered as a trustee in bankruptcy (Russian: арбитражный управляющий; transliteration: arbitrazhnyy upravlyayushchiy), one must:

1. to have a higher education degree,
2. to have at least 1 year of an experience as a chief executive officer,
3. to complete the Single programme for the training of trustees in bankruptcy (Russian: Единая программа подготовки арбитражных управляющих) and to pass a qualification exam,
4. to get two-years traineeship as assistant of trustee in bankruptcy,
5. to join to one of self-regulatory organizations of trustees in bankruptcy.

Person who has finished up all above-mentioned requirements is entered in the consolidated state registry of trustees in bankruptcy (Russian: сводный государственный реестр арбитражных управляющих) which is maintained by Federal Service for State Registration, Cadastre and Cartography.

Russian trustee in bankruptcy can be the member of only 1 self-regulatory organizations of trustees in bankruptcy. He can carry out other activities compatible with the position of trustee in bankruptcy, for example, be an individual entrepreneur or advocate, but the status of individual entrepreneur and the status of advocate are incompatible with each other.

The term "арбитражный управляющий" (transliteration: arbitrazhnyy upravlyayushchiy) means job title. After entrance in particular insolvency (bankruptcy) case, trustee in bankruptcy is called using special term depending on particular insolvency (bankruptcy) proceeding in this case:

- interim officer (Russian: временный управляющий; transliteration: vremennyy upravlyayushchiy) in monitoring procedure (Russian: наблюдение; transliteration: nablyudeniye) in insolvency (bankruptcy) cases of legal persons,
- administrative officer (Russian: административный управляющий; transliteration: administrativnyy upravlyayushchiy) in economic recovery procedure (Russian: финансовое оздоровление; transliteration: finansovoe ozdorovleniye) in insolvency (bankruptcy) cases of legal persons,
- external manager (Russian: внешний управляющий; transliteration: vneshnyy upravlyayushchiy) in external control procedure (Russian: внешнее управление; transliteration: vneshneye upravleniye) in insolvency (bankruptcy) cases of legal persons,
- settlement officer (Russian: конкурсный управляющий; transliteration: konkursnyy upravlyayushchiy) in liquidation procedure (Russian: конкурсное производство; transliteration: konkursnoe proizvodstvo) in insolvency (bankruptcy) cases of legal persons,
- financial officer (Russian: финансовый управляющий; transliteration: finansovyy upravlyayushchiy) in all procedures in insolvency (bankruptcy) cases of natural persons.

The Federal Law of 26 October 2002, No.127-FZ «About insolvency (bankruptcy)» provides that the function of settlement officer in liquidation procedure in insolvency (bankruptcy) cases of banks, insurance companies, pension funds and other financial institutions is carrying out by Deposit Insurance Agency of Russia (with some exceptions).

== United States ==
In the United States, a Trustee in Bankruptcy is a person who is appointed by the United States Trustee Program, a division of the United States Department of Justice to handle daily administration for bankruptcy proceedings. Trustees are not government employees but private citizens. In limited circumstances, the creditors involved in a bankruptcy case can elect a trustee.

In a Chapter 7 Bankruptcy ("Liquidation") the trustee gathers the debtor's non-exempt property, managing the funds from the sale of those assets, and then paying expenses and distributing the balance to the owed creditors.

In a Chapter 13 Bankruptcy ("Reorganization") the trustee is responsible for receiving the debtor's monthly payments and distributing those funds proportionally to the debtor's creditors. The Bankruptcy Trustee will act on behalf of the debtor to guarantee that both the creditors’ and the debtor's interests are maintained in accordance with the bankruptcy laws, and will often be required to act as a negotiator between the two parties.

Since the 1990s, duties similar to those of a trustee are sometimes performed by an individual called a Chief restructuring officer (CRO), generally prior to, or subsequent to, a bankruptcy proceeding (generally, a Chapter 11 proceeding). A CRO is an official of the company who has direct contact with the creditors and who has executive power to implement changes. The advantage of using a CRO is that the arrangement gives both the creditor and debtor more say over the future of the company than might be the case where a Chapter 11 bankruptcy trustee is appointed.

== See also ==
- Receiver (legal)
