= Gregory F. Rayburn =

American businessman (born 1959)

- Born: 1958 (age 67–68); United States
- Education: University of Alabama
- Occupation: Former CEO of Hostess Brands

Gregory F. Rayburn (born 1958) is an American businessman. He formerly was chairman and CEO of Hostess Brands.

== Career ==
After receiving an undergraduate and Master of Arts degree in accounting from the University of Alabama in 1982, he became a partner for Corporate Recovery Services at Arthur Andersen until 1994. From 1996 to 1998, Rayburn was CEO of Piece Goods Shops, a Winston-Salem, North Carolina, chain with 318 stores that had gone into bankruptcy in 1991. Under Rayburn, the company was sold to Mae's Fabrics.

Rayburn went on to become CEO of Sunterra Resorts, which had previously entered bankruptcy in 2001, from 2002 to 2003. Sunterra successfully avoided liquidation and emerged from bankruptcy in July 2002. It became Diamond Resorts International.

From 2003 to 2004, he was Chief Restructuring Officer (CRO) of Worldcom at a time when it changed its name from Worldcom to MCI. The company eventually emerged from bankruptcy in 2004 and subsequently was purchased by Verizon Communications. After leaving MCI, Rayburn was CRO of AAIPharma Services Corp. in Wilmington, North Carolina, from 2004 to 2005. The company had run into trouble in a scandal over its accounting practices in 2004 and went into bankruptcy in 2005 after selling its pharmaceutical division to Xanodyne.

Between 2005 and 2006, Rayburn was CEO of Muzak, which was struggling at the time. He failed to turn the company around and was replaced by Steve Villa, who made an unsuccessful attempt to merge Muzak with DMX Music. The company eventually went into bankruptcy in 2009, three years after Rayburn left.

From 2009 to 2010, Rayburn was CEO of the thoroughbred horse-raising company Magna Entertainment, which was in bankruptcy. After Magna Entertainment, Rayburn was CEO of New York City OTB from 2010 to 2011. Following the New York Senate rejection of his plans for a turnaround, he shut down the city's OTB operation. From 2011 to 2012, Rayburn was CRO of the Indiana Downs racetrack which morphed into the Indiana Grand Casino racino.

In 2010, he started his private consulting business, Kobi Partners, LLC, in Kiawah Island, South Carolina. The following year, Rayburn was named a board member of The Great Atlantic & Pacific Tea Company, which had gone into bankruptcy. The company emerged from bankruptcy in 2012.

In March 2012, he became CEO of Hostess Brands, a month after the company had gone into bankruptcy. He initially was brought in as CRO in February 2012, by CEO Brian Driscoll. Rayburn was named CEO once Driscoll abruptly resigned in March 2012. After the Bakery, Confectionery, Tobacco Workers, and Grain Millers International Union went on strike in November 2012, opposing court-ordered wage concessions which had been agreed to by other unions, Rayburn requested court authority to liquidate the company because it was no longer able to meet production demands at its bakeries. Rayburn then led a sale of the brands, generating almost $1 billion to satisfy secured claims.

Rayburn has appeared numerous times on CNBC, FOX business news, and Bloomberg television. He has also done guest lectures on operational turnarounds for MBA programs at NYU, Georgetown, and Wake Forest University.
