= Schmidt Baking Company =

Bakery in Baltimore, Maryland, U.S

Schmidt Baking Company is a bakery in Baltimore, Maryland, U.S. The company makes Schmidt's Blue Ribbon and Schmidt's Old Tyme Breads and, as a licensee of the Quality Bakers of America Cooperative, bakes and distributes Sunbeam Bread in its territory.

It was founded in Baltimore, Maryland, in 1886 by Elizabeth and Peter Schmidt at their house using recipes from their native Germany. The company now has more than 800 employees and makes several varieties of bread, most prominently white bread.

Its 1970s and 1980s advertising jingle was "I like bread and butter, I like toast and jam, I like Schmidt's Blue Ribbon Bread, It's my favorite brand", which was derived from The Newbeats 1964 song, "Bread and Butter".

There was a major fire at an empty building owned by the company on Fitch Lane in Fullerton, Maryland, in April 2008.

In 1941, the company was cited by the National Labor Relations Board for failing to engage in collective bargaining with its employees.

The company sponsored the Preakness Stakes pre-race parade in Baltimore for three years.

In 1996, the company was the subject of an IRS lawsuit regarding when vacation pay and severance pay can be considered deferred compensation by a company in its tax returns. The resulting ruling on this case was used in proposed changes to the law.

In 2012 Schmidt acquired the rights to Holsum and Milano in Harrisburg and Scranton from Bimbo Bakeries USA.

During an Early January 2022 winter storm in Virginia when travelers were trapped in their cars, some for more than 24 hours, a driver hauling bread for Schmidt was asked to open the truck and distribute the bread to drivers stranded on the highway.

== See also ==
- History of the Germans in Baltimore
