= Flowers Foods =

Commercial bakery company in the United States

Coordinates: 30°50′11″N 83°58′42″W

Flowers Foods, Inc.

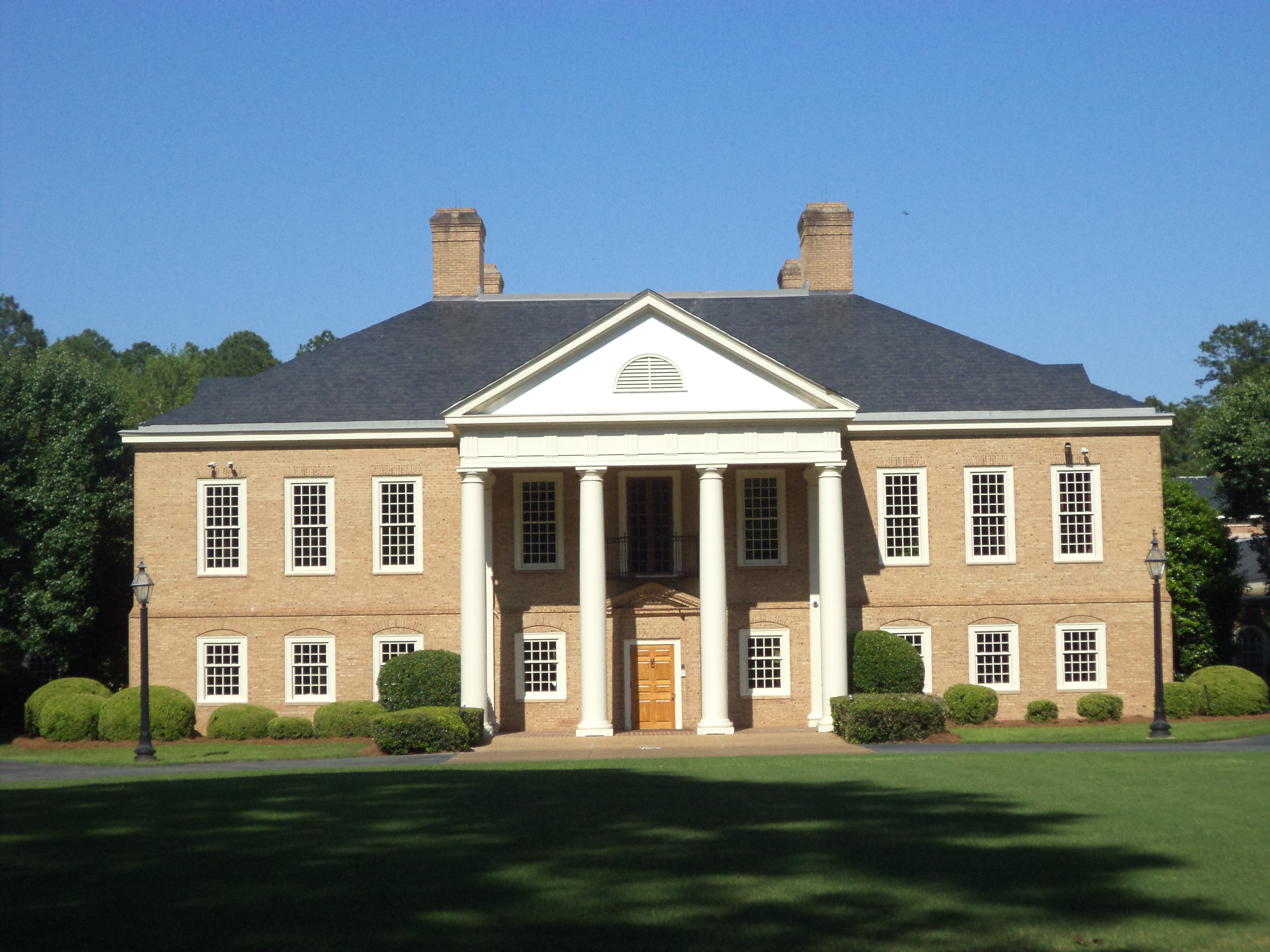
- Headquarters in Thomasville, Georgia
- Type: Public
- Traded as: NYSE: FLO; S&P 600 component
- Industry: Packaged bakery products
- Founded: 1919; 107 years ago
- Headquarters: Thomasville, Georgia, U.S.
- Key people: George E. Deese (Non-executive Chairman of the Board); A. Ryals McMullian (President and CEO)
- Products: Wonder Bread, Nature's Own, Sunbeam, Mrs. Freshley's, Canyon Bakehouse, Simple Mills, Mi Casa, Tastykake, Dave's Killer Bread, Merita Breads, Captain John Derst's, Evangeline Maid, European Bakers, Butternut, Bunny Bread, Homepride, Papa Pita, Great Grains, Bubba's
- Revenue: $5.256 billion (2025)
- Net income: ▼US$83.8 million (2025)
- Number of employees: 10,200 (2025)
- Website: flowersfoods.com

Flowers Foods, Inc., headquartered in Thomasville, Georgia, is a producer and marketer of packaged bakery foods in the United States. The company operates 44 bakeries across 19 states that produce a variety of products, including bread, buns, snack cakes, rolls, tortillas and pastries. As of February 2013, Flowers Foods had grown to be the "second-largest baking company in the United States."

Flowers Foods owns several well-known bread and baked goods brands, including Wonder, Nature's Own, Canyon Bakehouse, Dave's Killer Bread, Simple Mills, Tastykake, Mrs. Freshley's, and more. The company continues to expand its market reach through acquisitions and by extending its existing territory.

Flowers Foods distributes its products through two main channels: Direct Store Delivery (DSD) and Warehouse. The DSD segment handles the regional distribution of products through a network of independent distributors. The DSD segment encompasses almost 6,000 independent distributor territories across the East, South, Southwest, West, and Northwest regions of the United States. Flowers' Warehouse segment manages the national distribution of frozen products, which are shipped directly to customers' warehouses throughout the continental United States.

== History ==
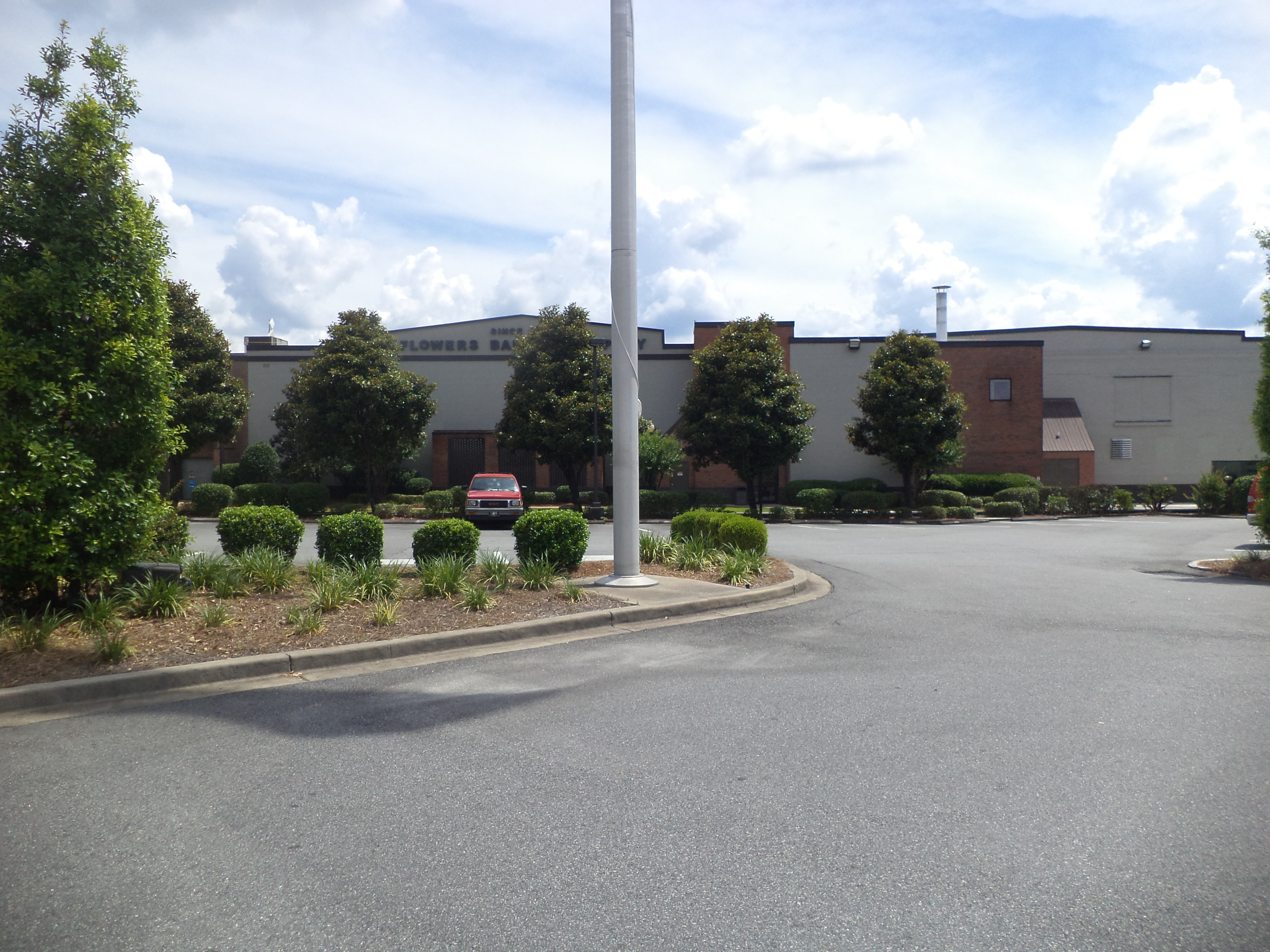
Main bakery in Thomasville, Georgia

=== 1914–1942 ===
In 1914, brothers William Howard and Joseph Hampton Flowers founded the Flowers Ice Cream Company in Thomasville, Georgia. To meet local demand for fresh bread, they established the Flowers Baking Company in 1919. The bakery initially sold 500 loaves of "Flowers Quality Bread" on its first morning, utilizing modern equipment capable of producing 30,000 loaves daily. Throughout the 1920s, the company expanded its distribution of bread, rolls, and cakes via rail into southern Georgia, Alabama, and Florida.

During the company's early years, William Howard Flowers managed the bakery while Joseph Hampton Flowers oversaw the ice cream operations. In 1929, the firm completed its first divestiture by selling the ice cream division to Foremost Dairies. Following the death of William Howard Flowers in 1934, his son, William Howard Flowers Jr., assumed leadership of the bakery.

The company made its first acquisition in 1937 by purchasing the Tally Maid Bakery of Tallahassee, Florida. During World War II, the bakery operated continuously to supply bread to U.S. military camps across the southeastern United States. In 1942, Flowers became the sixth bakery in the country to franchise Quality Bakers of America's Sunbeam brand, incorporating the Little Miss Sunbeam mascot on its packaging.

=== 1960s–1980s ===
During the 1960s, Flowers expanded by purchasing bakeries in Panama City, Florida and Opelika, Alabama. The company constructed a new bakery in Jacksonville, Florida in 1965, and entered the metropolitan Atlanta market two years later by acquiring the Atlanta Baking Company.

In 1968, the company launched an initial public offering, changed its name to Flowers Industries Inc., and began trading over-the-counter. The following year, the company listed on the American Stock Exchange. The stock offering raised over $2 million, funding a series of acquisitions of bakeries across Virginia, Alabama, Louisiana, and the Carolinas. Flowers entered the frozen foods market in 1976 by purchasing Stilwell Foods, a frozen vegetable producer.

To accommodate its growth, the company moved its headquarters in 1975 to a new 15-acre corporate complex south of Thomasville, Georgia. Flowers listed on the New York Stock Exchange in 1982 under the ticker symbol "FLO" and debuted on the Fortune 500 list of the largest U.S. industrial corporations the following year at number 470. During the 1980s, the company temporarily diversified into selling sandwiches and cookies, exiting both ventures by the end of the decade while continuing to acquire bakeries across the southeastern and southwestern United States.

=== 1990s–present ===
In 1996, Flowers Industries expanded its portfolio by acquiring the Mrs. Smith's frozen dessert brand and entering a joint venture to purchase the Keebler Company. By the early 2000s, the company refocused on its core snack cake and bread operations. It divested its interest in Keebler Company in 2001 for $1.2 billion, subsequently restructuring and rebranding as Flowers Foods. The company then sold Mrs. Smith's in 2003.

Flowers Foods continues to pursue acquisitions to expand into emerging product categories. These initiatives include targing the Hispanic market with its Mi Casa tortilla line, and offering organic products—such as Dave's Killer Bread and Alpine Valley Bread—alongside keto-friendly items and smaller loaf variations under its Nature's Own Brand.

== Acquisitions ==
In 1976, the company entered the frozen foods market by acquiring Stilwell Foods of Stilwell, Oklahoma, along with its Rio Grande Foods unit in McAllen, Texas. In 1996, Flowers acquired both the Keebler Company and Mrs. Smith's Pies. However, in 2001 it sold its investment in Keebler to the Kellogg Company. Its remaining business units, Flowers Bakeries and Mrs. Smith's Bakeries, were spun off into a new entity named Flowers Foods. In 2002, the company restructured into three divisions: Flowers Bakeries, Flowers Snack, and Mrs. Smith's Bakeries.

In late 2002, Flowers purchased Ideal Baking Company and acquired Bishop Baking Company from Kellogg, expanding its presence into north Arkansas, southern Missouri, and parts of Tennessee, including Memphis. In 2003, Flowers sold its Mrs. Smith's frozen dessert business to the Schwan Food Company and renamed the Flowers Snack division, resulting in two divisions: Flowers Bakeries and Flowers Specialty.

In 2005, Flowers acquired Royal Cake Company and continued operating its bakery in Winston-Salem, North Carolina. In February 2006, Flowers purchased Derst Baking Co. of Savannah, Georgia, which retained its name under the Flowers Foods Bakeries Group. In 2008, Flowers acquired ButterKrust Bakery in Lakeland, Florida and Holsum Bakery in Phoenix. In 2009, the company purchased Leo's Foods, a tortilla manufacturer.

Acquisitions continued into the 2010s. In 2011, Flowers acquired Philadelphia-based snack cake maker Tastykake, expanding into the mid-Atlantic region. In 2012, it purchased Lepage Bakeries in Maine and acquired assets and licenses from Bimbo Bakeries for the Sara Lee and Earthgrains brands in California and Oklahoma City. In 2013, the company purchased most of the bread brands of Hostess Brands, including Wonder Bread, along with 20 closed Hostess bakeries.

Flowers Foods made three acquisitions in 2015: Dave's Killer Bread of Milwaukie, Oregon, for $275 million in cash; Alpine Valley Bread Co., an organic bakery in Mesa, Arizona; and the North American rights to the Roman Meal trademark for bread, buns, and rolls. At the end of 2018, Flowers Foods acquired Canyon Bakehouse, a privately held gluten-free bread company based in Johnstown, Colorado. With that purchase, the company had acquired 16 companies since 2003.

Flowers Foods bought Papa Pita for an undisclosed amount in 2023. Most recently, in the first quarter of 2025, Flowers Foods acquired Simple Mills for $795 million in cash.

== Heritage Center ==
The Flowers Foods Heritage Center is housed in a historic building in Thomasville, Georgia. Constructed in 1919, the building initially served as the local post office and was later repurposed as the Thomas County Public Library. After the library relocated to the corner of Jefferson and Madison Streets on May 13, 1993, the structure remained vacant for over two decades.

In 2015, Flowers Foods acquired the property and funded a comprehensive restoration of the two-story building and its basement. Register Construction managed the project, which included exterior excavation and waterproofing, interior demolition, the installation of an elevator, and finishes corresponding to the building’s Victorian Architecture. The project was completed two months ahead of schedule, and the renovation subsequently received an Excellence in Rehabilitation Award from the Georgia Trust for Historic Preservation.

The Flowers Foods Heritage Center officially opened on May 24, 2019, featuring a self-guided, interactive exhibition titled "History in the Baking." The exhibit details the company's 100-year evolution from a local, family-owned bakery into a multi-billion-dollar enterprise listed on the New York Stock Exchange. Additionally, the center features displays dedicated to the regional history of Thomasville, the architectural history of the building, and the genealogy of the Flowers family.

== See also ==
- List of brand name breads
