= Chief restructuring officer =

A chief restructuring officer (CRO) is a senior officer of a company given broad powers to renegotiate all aspects of a company's finances to deal with an impending bankruptcy or to restructure a company following a bankruptcy filing. The use of CROs, who usually have an expertise in the field of business in which the company operates, has been increasing in popularity since the 1990s. CROs are sometimes seen as an alternative to using a trustee in bankruptcy in a reorganization bankruptcy, because the trustees may not be knowledgeable in field of business conducted by the company.

Further CROs give the company management and creditors more of say in the running of a company than a trustee is required to do so. CRO's have sometimes been compared to "turn around" consultants although the CRO differs from a turn around consultant in that the CRO is an official of the company and has executive power.

While CROs officially report to the company and its board of directors, they are considered to have greatly strengthened the hand of creditors since the CRO can make executive decisions following a direct meeting with the creditors. On occasional instances, the CRO can oust the chief executive officer (CEO) or president of the company, as happened in 2012 when Gregory F. Rayburn replaced Hostess Brands CEO Brian Driscoll as CEO a month after being appointed CRO.
