= Alvarado Street Bakery =

Bakery in Petaluma, California, US

Coordinates: 38.23074°N 122.59142°W

- Type: Cooperative
- Industry: Bakery
- Founded: 1979; 47 years ago
- Headquarters: Petaluma, California; United States
- Number of employees: 80
- Website: www.alvaradostreetbakery.com

Alvarado Street Bakery is a worker-owned bakery located in Petaluma, California, that produces certified organic whole grain breads and bagels. Alvarado was featured in the 2009 Michael Moore documentary, Capitalism: A Love Story.

Alvarado is organized as a worker cooperative and each employee receives one share in the cooperative. The shares grant each employee an equal vote on business matters, including employee benefits, salaries and the reinvestment of profits. As of 2009, more than half of the employees had been with the company for over 15 years and the average worker earns between $65,000 and $70,000 a year.

== History ==
Alvarado Street Bakery began in 1977 as a part of an employee-owned non-profit business called the Red Clover Worker's Brigade, an umbrella organization for several natural foods businesses in the San Francisco Bay Area. By 1981, only two businesses still operated, Alvarado Street Bakery and Santa Rosa Community Market. Five of the eight workers of the bakery, Bruce Gustin, Diana Thomas, Louisa Aranow, Sandy Turner, and Debbie Edwards, separated from the market to found the Semper Virens Bakery Food Cooperative, Inc. which does business under the name of Alvarado Street Bakery. The name comes from a knocked over Alvarado Street sign from Venice Beach, Los Angeles from a sprouted wheat berry delivery run.

The bakery's growth and use of organic ingredients was partly responsible for its success within the organic food industry in the 1980s. Alvarado Street Bakery ships out over 40,000 loaves of bread a day that they bake in their solar-powered bakery, and is best known for the flour-less sprouted wheat breads that they produce.
