= Dave's Killer Bread =

American bakery brand

- Logo of Dave's Killer Bread

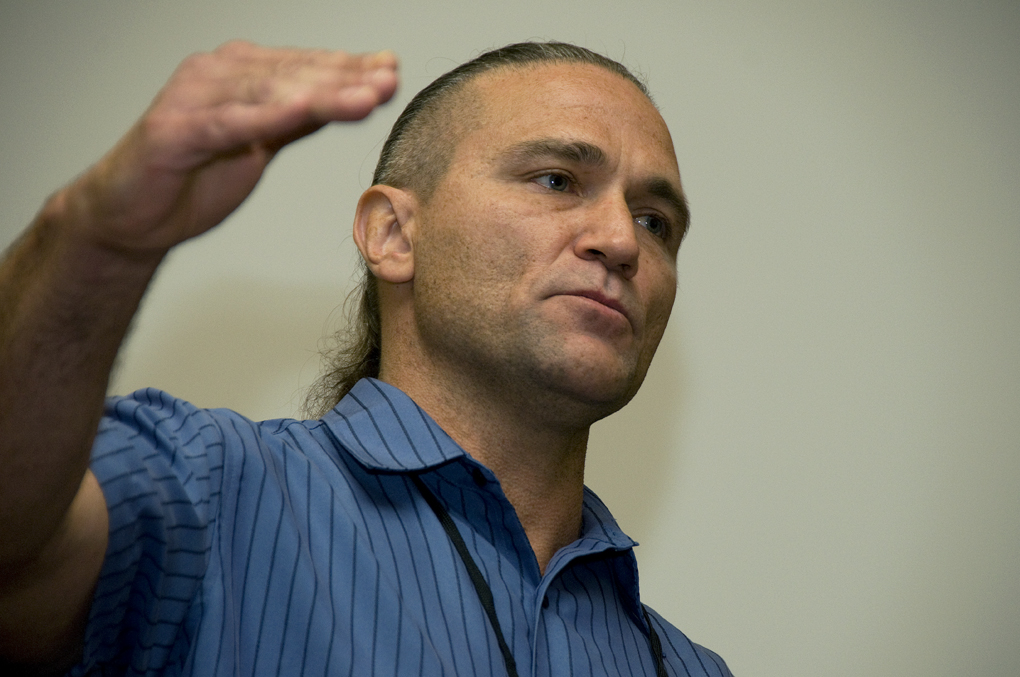
- Brand founder Dave Dahl in 2008
- Current owner: Flowers Foods
- Country: United States
- Introduced: 2005
- Markets: United States
- Website: daveskillerbread.com

Dave's Killer Bread is a US brand of organic whole-grain products. The company also aims to increase employment opportunities for people who have criminal backgrounds.

== History ==
The brand was founded in 2005 in Milwaukie, Oregon, by Dave Dahl, who learned to bake working in his family's bakery in his youth. The company expanded from 30 employees to more than 190 by 2010 and to 280 at the end of 2012. The company had twenty-five percent growth in increased retail sales in 2015 and has continued to grow since.

Dave's Killer Bread is sold and distributed in the United States. It was available in Canada until 2022. Each product is certified organic by the US Department of Agriculture and is part of the Non-GMO Project Verified program to avoid genetically modified food. The brand specializes in breads made with seeds and whole grains, including spelt, sprouted wheat, amaranth, barley, blue cornmeal, and pumpkin. Recipes avoid any animal products or chemical additives.

Flowers Foods bought the brand in 2015 for $275 million. Dahl reportedly received $33 million in the sale. With Flowers Foods, the brand has become the largest organic bread company in North America. Prior to the sale, Dave's Killer Bread was in 8,000 stores, but since the sale in 2015 is now in over 20,000.

== Products ==
Dave's Killer Bread is marketed in 23 varieties and is the most popular organic sliced bread in the US. Loaves are sold as the classic "Killer Bread" and in thin-sliced versions. In addition to the signature organic whole grain loaves, Dave's sells breakfast breads, English muffins, bagels, and buns. In 2023 company launched soft-baked snack bars in three flavors, now expanded to six, and a line of "snack bites" in six other flavors.
