= Sunbeam Bread =

Franchised brand of baked goods owned by the Quality Bakers of America

Sunbeam
- Product type: Baked goods
- Current owner: Quality Bakers of America
- Country: United States
- Introduced: 1942
- Website: flowersfoods.com

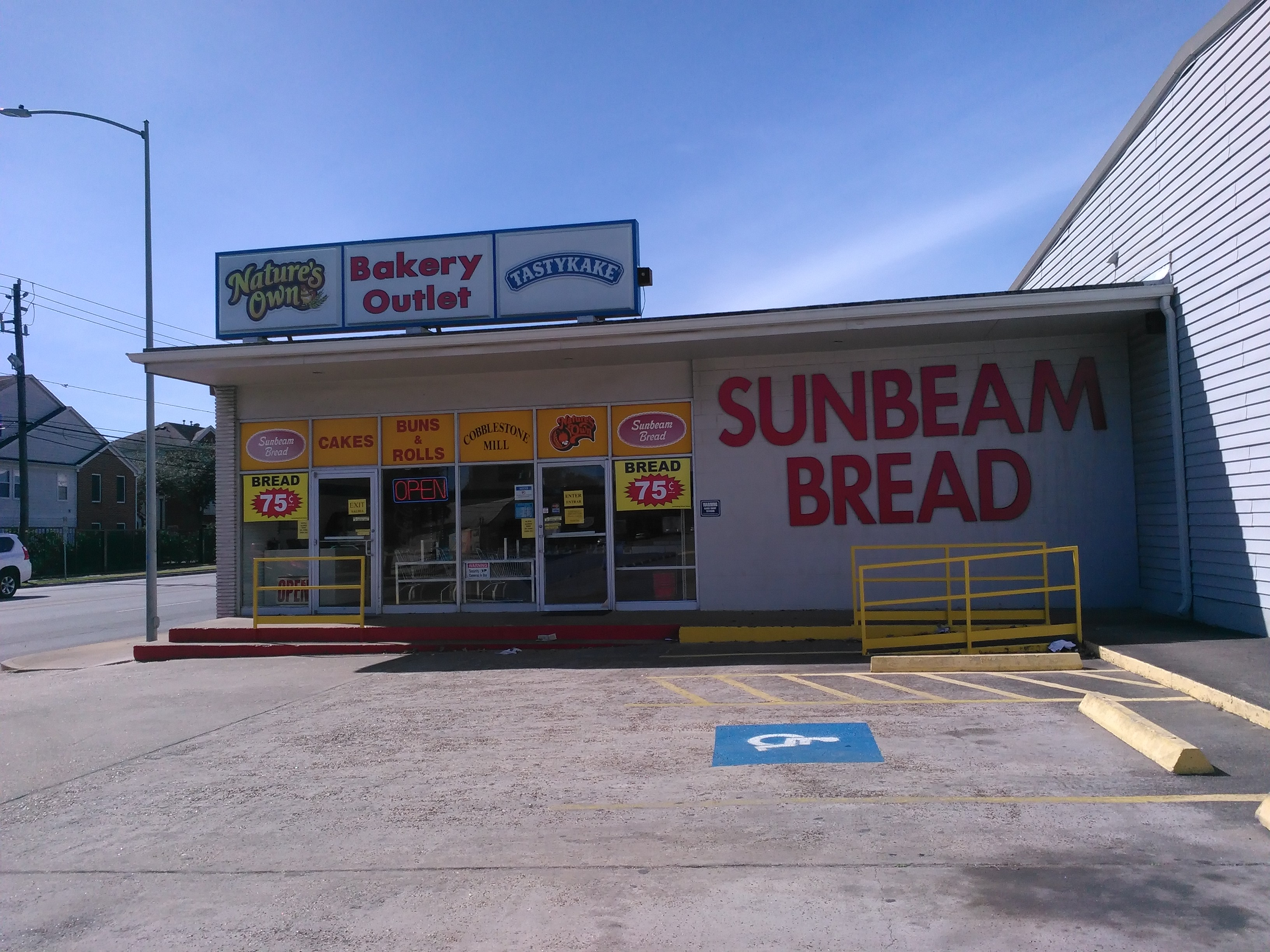
Sunbeam Bread outlet in Houston.

Sunbeam Bread is a franchised brand of white bread, rolls, and other baked goods owned by the Quality Bakers of America cooperative. The bread products are produced and distributed by regional bakeries.

== History ==
Originally, Sunbeam Bread was known as Davidson’s Ideal Bread. The bread was sold by Davidson Baking Company, which was founded in 1914 by Eugene F. Davidson.

The brand was launched in 1942 and was first marketed in New Bedford, Massachusetts.

After World War II, the company joined the Quality Bakers of America (QBA) Cooperative, which marketed Sunbeam Bread and introduced Little Miss Sunbeam. Recognition of the Sunbeam brand and Little Miss Sunbeam led to the Davidson Baking Company to be often referred to as the Sunbeam Bakery.

Today, the QBA still owns the Sunbeam Bread brand, with Flowers Foods being the sixth bakery in the USA to franchise the Sunbeam brand, as well as the country's current top producer of Sunbeam bakery foods.

== Little Miss Sunbeam ==
Sunbeam's long-time mascot is called Little Miss Sunbeam. In 1942, illustrator Ellen Barbara Segner was commissioned by the Quality Bakers of America to create a marketing symbol of a young child. Over six months she submitted hundreds of sketches before coming across the girl who would become the first Miss Sunbeam in Southern Indiana.

The image of the holiday Little Miss Sunbeam first appeared on a billboard in the 1950s. Flowers Foods, the largest distributor of Sunbeam bread, has used this image of Little Miss Sunbeam on billboards and bread bags during the holiday season, in their Sunbeam markets, since 2001. US soldiers in Vietnam would state that they were members of the "Little Miss Sunbeam Club," as they had no wounds as declared in the "batter-whipped" bread's promotional claim of "no holes" ensuring freshness and firmness.

== Licensees ==
- Aunt Millie’s
- Bimbo Bakeries USA
- Flowers Foods
- Lewis Bakeries
- Schmidt Baking Company
- Wolf Bakeries

== See also ==
- List of bakeries
- List of brand name breads
