= M. Lee Marshall =

American food corporation executive and relief official (1884–1950)

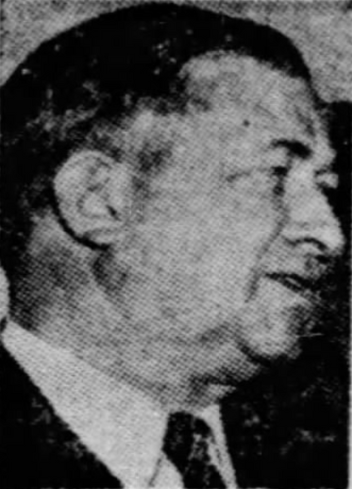

1st Deputy Director of the War Food Administration
- In office May 1943 – January 1944
- President: Franklin D. Roosevelt
- Preceded by: Office established
- Succeeded by: Grover B. Hill

Personal details
- Born: Maple Lee Marshall; June 17, 1884 Marshall, Missouri, U.S.
- Died: August 1, 1950 (aged 66) New York City, U.S.
- Spouse: Anna McCluer (m. 1907)
- Children: 1
- Committees: War Production Board
- Other roles held: President and chairman, Continental Baking Company; Vice president and director, Commodity Credit Corporation; President and director, Federal Surplus Commodities Corporation; Executive director, Famine Relief Collection Drive; Member, Combined Food Board; National chairman, American Overseas Aid; Board chairman, Missouri Valley College

Maple Lee "M. Lee" Marshall (June 17, 1884 – August 1, 1950) was an American food corporation executive and international relief official who served as president and chairman of the Continental Baking Company and held various governmental and humanitarian roles.

== Early life and education ==
Born in Marshall, Missouri on June 17, 1884, the son of Charles E. Marshall and Lee Willis Marshall, Maple Lee Marshall was the great-great-great-grandson of John Marshall, the first Chief Justice of the United States Supreme Court.

His father worked as a bookkeeper at the Rea and Page Flour Mill. The family later relocated to Kansas City, where Marshall attended local elementary schools and briefly attended Manual Training High School. During his youth, he held various part-time jobs, including positions as a newsboy for the Kansas City Star, a Western Union messenger, and a sandwich vendor at a local ballpark. In the summer months, he worked as a bat boy for the Kansas City Blues.

== Career ==
In 1901, Marshall began his professional career as an office boy at the H.P. Wright Investment Company in Kansas City. In 1903, he joined Swift and Company as a stenographer, earning a weekly salary of fifteen dollars. He was soon promoted to salesman, covering the southern Missouri territory. By 1905, he worked as a salesman for his brother Edwin's flour brokerage, and in 1907, he established his own flour brokerage business.

In 1915, Marshall became the manager of the Kansas City plant of the Campbell Baking Company, with the opportunity to purchase company stock. A year later, he was promoted to vice president. In 1922, when Campbell Baking Company merged with United Bakeries Corporation, Marshall was appointed vice president and director, overseeing forty bakeries.

In 1924, United Bakeries Corporation merged with General Baking and Ward Baking companies to form the Continental Baking Company. By 1927, Marshall had become chairman of the company (later also becoming president of the company in 1934), a position he held until 1944.

At the time that he was elected as chairman, the corporation was the largest baking company in the world, employing over 12,000 employees and operating over 100 bakeries in eighty-three cities across the United States. By 1929, the company had over 18,000 stockholders.

Under Marshall's leadership, Continental Baking began marketing Wonder Bread in sliced form nationwide, one of the first companies to do so; this was a significant milestone for the industry and for American consumers, who, at first, needed reassurance that "wonder-cut" bread would not dry out. He also was one of the first industry leaders to commercialize wheat bread. This included a display and wheat field at the 1939 New York World's Fair.

=== Public service ===
During World War II, Marshall served in several governmental roles. In April 1942, he was appointed Chief of the Shipping Procedure Branch of the United States Army Services of Supply, addressing bottlenecks in military supply logistics. From September 1942 to May 1943, he served on the War Production Board as a food consultant to chairman Donald Nelson.

In May 1943, he was appointed as the first Deputy Administrator (First Assistant Administrator) of the War Food Administration, overseeing the allocation of materials for food production and processing. In January 1944, he became Director of the Office of Distribution, responsible for ensuring the availability of food from farms to consumers. During this period, he also served as vice president and director of the Commodity Credit Corporation and president and director of the Federal Surplus Commodities Corporation.

After resigning from government service in early 1945, Marshall returned to the Continental Baking Company as chairman. He also served as treasurer and a member of the board of the American Bakers Association, and a trustee of the American Institute of Baking.

In May 1946, he was appointed executive director of the Famine Relief Collection Drive by Henry A. Wallace, leading efforts to collect canned food and funds for overseas aid. In November 1947, he became national chairman of American Overseas Aid, an organization tasked with raising 60 million dollars and unifying major American voluntary overseas relief activities, including the United Nations Appeal for Children.

In the late 1940s, Marshall was appointed by President Harry S. Truman to serve on the Business Advisory Council of the Department of Commerce. In his hometown, Marshall was appointed as board chairman of Missouri Valley College in June 1950. He previously had served as the board's vice president.

== Personal life ==
Marshall was married to Anna McLuer of Kansas City in 1907, and they had one son.

Marshall described his political views as a "Missouri Democrat and a New York Republican." Marshall was also a Mason, holding thirty-second degree Knight Templar and Shriner titles, and belonged to several clubs, including the Apawamis Club of Rye, New York, the Union League and Athletic clubs of New York City, the Pilgrims, and the New York Bakers Club.

Before his death, he made a substantial monetary donation to the new women's dormitory at Missouri Valley College.

== Death ==
Marshall died of a heart attack on August 1, 1950, at the age of 66 at his home in New York City. He was buried at Ferncliff Cemetery.

After his death, President Truman sent a message of condolence to Marshall's family. Statements of condolence were also issued by U.S. Secretary of Commerce Charles Sawyer, H. Roe Bartle, and former Postmaster General Will H. Hays.

== Awards ==
In 1948, Marshall was a recipient of an honorary doctorate degree from Franklin & Marshall College.
