= Bond Bread =

Brand name bread

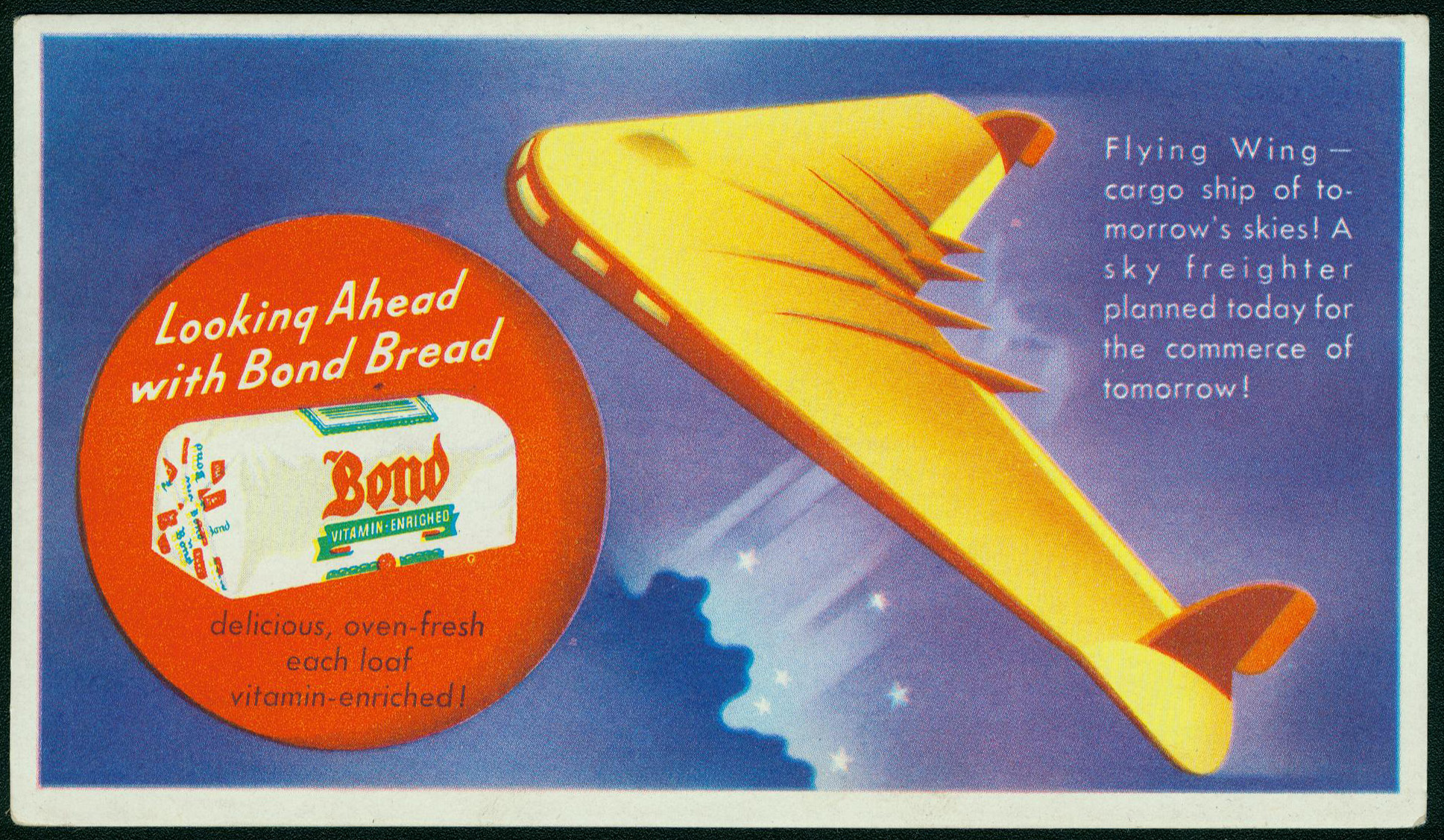
- A fanciful flying wing
- Product type: Bread
- Produced by: General Baking Company
- Country: United States
- Introduced: 1915
- Markets: United States

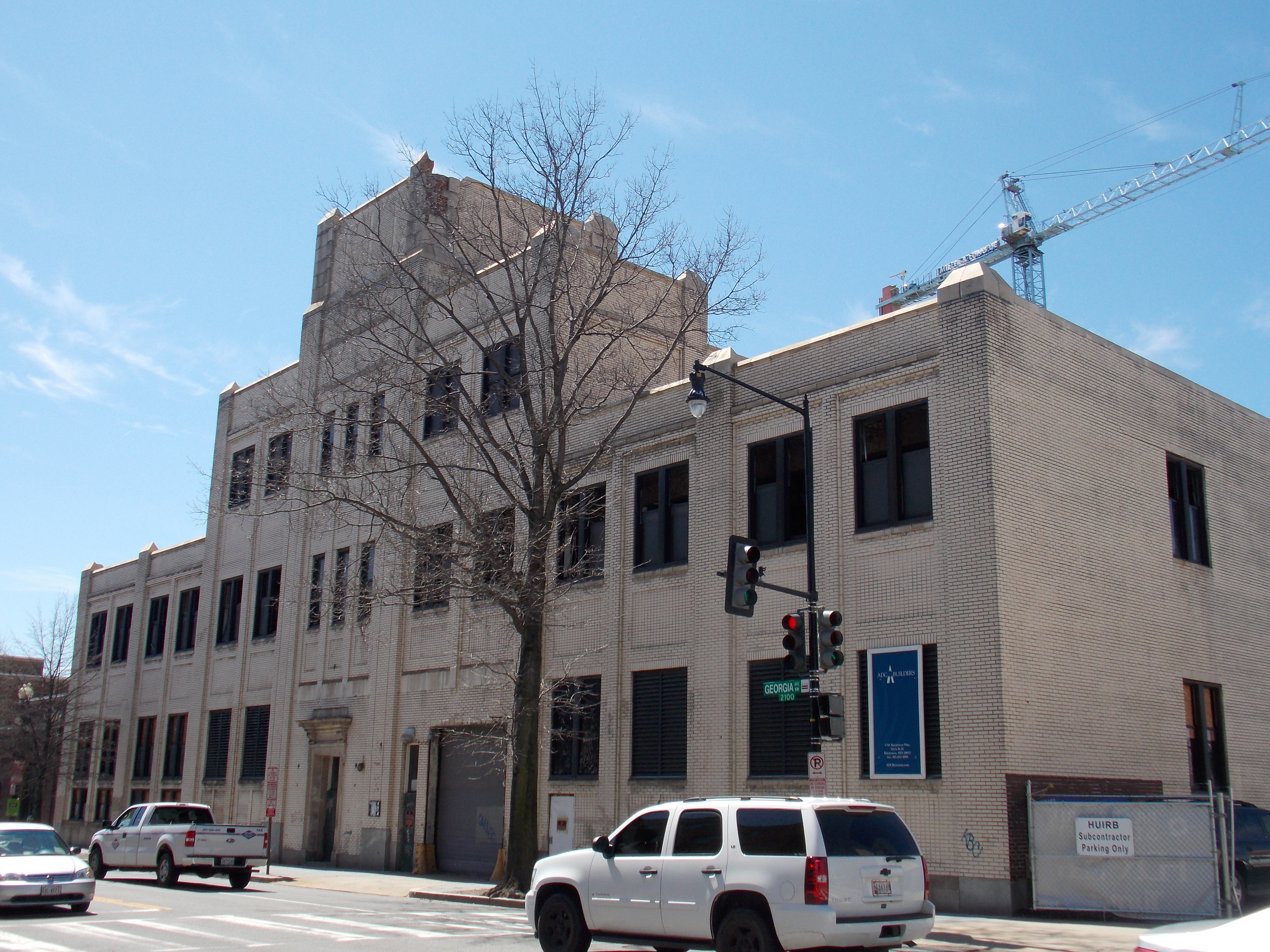
General Baking Company/Bond Bread Factory on Georgia Ave NW in Washington DC

Bond Bread was a product of General Baking Company. The name comes from the term bond, meaning 'a promise or guarantee of repayment of debt'. The company used the name as a way to say its purity of ingredients were guaranteed like it was home-made bread.

== History ==
The idea for Bond Bread came from William Deininger, president of General Baking Company at the time. The company was producing bread under the name "Superior Bread" which Deininger became aware contained 65 substitute ingredients. He held a national recipe contest in 1915 to award the housewives who sent him the best recipes for bread. He received more than 45,000 responses.

The first loaves of Bond Bread were manufactured in Rochester, New York. Deininger stated he was creating a bond that pledged only high-quality ingredients, hence the name of the brand. One of its main competitors was Continental Baking which sold its main product under the name Wonder Bread.

In 1972, General Host (trading as Bond Baking Company in Philadelphia) and two executives were fined $16,000 for unsanitary conditions at a bakery. The conditions were originally discovered when a mouse was discovered sliced in a loaf of Bond bread.

In 1979, Bond Baking Company declared bankruptcy and shut down.

== Bond Bread Factories/Bakeries ==
The Bond Bread Factory is located at 2146 Georgia Avenue NW in Washington, D.C. The factory was designed by architect Corry B. Comstock and constructed in 1929. The now vacant property is owned by Howard University. In 2013, the site was designated as a historic landmark in the District of Columbia Inventory of Historic Sites.

An earlier bakery, built in 1925 and believed to also have been designed by Comstock, was located at 479-297 Flatbush Avenue in Brooklyn, New York, a few blocks from Ebbets Field and Prospect Park (Brooklyn). The building was sold to Denk Baking Company in 1971, which produced bread there until 1996. As of 2021, the building remains standing and hosts retail, fitness and co-working tenants.

== See also ==
- List of brand name breads
