= Frank's Nursery & Crafts =

American retailer

Frank's Nursery & Crafts, Inc.
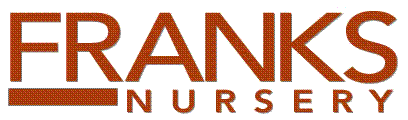
- Industry: Retail
- Founded: 1957
- Defunct: 2004, revived as online store April 2022
- Fate: Bankruptcy
- Successor: None
- Headquarters: Troy, Michigan
- Products: Shrubbery, trees, plants, lawn furniture, lawn chemicals, accent plants, holiday decorations
- Parent: General Host Corporation

Frank's Nursery & Crafts was an American retailer devoted to the sale of lawn and garden products. It operated a chain of stores, with 170 outlets across 14 states. It specialized in products such as shrubs, trees, accent plants, flowers, and lawn furniture, as well as various arts and crafts items.

== History ==
=== Frank's Market ===
In 1942, Frank Sherr and his nephew-in-law, Max Weinberg, opened a food market, known as Frank's Market, on the northeast side of Detroit. Known as "never closed and never undersold," the business became profitable. The market soon began to carry Christmas trees, annuals, and other plants in addition to its mainstay of produce and other goods

=== Frank begins a greenhouse ===
In 1949, Sherr and Weinberg purchased a vacant lot across the street from the market to house the growing number of plants the market offered. According to Sherr, the greenhouse was opened after a bout with a customer that complained the price of coffee at Frank's Market was too high but then willingly purchased a potted geranium for 79¢. The profits on the geranium were much higher than that on the coffee. This incident led Sherr and Weinberg to notice there was to be much more money made selling flowers. Soon after, Frank's Market began selling ferns, trees, lawn chemicals, and other landscaping supplies.

=== Growth ===
The business thrived, and in 1957 the company—by then four stores strong—incorporated, becoming Frank's Nursery Sales, Inc. By 1965 Frank's owned 18 stores throughout Michigan, and its sales were $11.35 million, with a net income of $509,000.

Since lawn-and-garden sales were dependent on season, the business was cyclical in nature, with highest revenues during the growing season. This led Sherr and Weinberg to devise a method to keep sales high during the winter months. In 1966, Frank's Trims, a store which only sold craft goods, opened its doors. The company's headquarters remained in Detroit, Michigan. In 1974 Frank's acquired five garden centers from the Green Giant Company.

By its 25th anniversary in 1971, Frank's had 51 locations in five states, employing approximately 1200 workers. Sales had reached approximately $37.2 million with a net profit of $1.13 million. During this time, Frank Sherr was succeeded by his son, I. William Sherr, who had previously served the company as executive vice-president and treasurer. Max Weinberg continued to serve as company president.

=== Frank's Nursery & Crafts, Inc. ===
In 1980, Frank's Nursery Sales officially changed its name to Frank's Nursery & Crafts, Inc. to emphasize both the lawn-and-garden and craft sector of its operation. Sales reached $119.3 million, and 80 locations were in operation. Much of Frank's expansion into different markets can be linked to the purchase of small regional chains.

In 1982, it acquired many former A&P stores.

It acquired Philadelphia-based Gaudio's in 1988.

In 1983, Frank's Nursery & Crafts was purchased by General Host Corporation. General Host bought 96 percent of Frank's shares in a $19-a-share tender offer in March 1983; the value of the sale was thus approximately $42.4 million. Frank's, at that time, spanned 95 stores.

Following its acquisition by General Host Corporation, Frank's used its parent company's wealth to go on an acquisition spree with the ultimate goal of becoming the first national garden center chain in the United States. Their first target was the New York-to-Washington, D.C. corridor. From 1983 to 1987, the company acquired 43 garden centers in the New York, Philadelphia, and Baltimore/Washington, D.C., metropolitan areas: 39 Flower Time Centers in the NYC metro area (acquired in 1986 and merged into Frank's stores by 1989), 14 Scott's Centers in the Baltimore/Washington, D.C., metro area (1986), and 12 independent garden centers in and around Philadelphia. In addition to its acquisitions, the company was also expanding its footprint southward, with new stores in Virginia, Florida, Georgia, and Tennessee. By 1990, Frank's had almost 300 stores.

=== Christmas by Frank's ===
In 1990, the first three Frank's stand-alone Christmas stores, Christmas by Frank's, opened. These stores were temporary installations placed in high-volume regional malls located in trade areas where Frank's also operated conventional stores. The Christmas stores provided shoppers with a convenient store (3,000-5,000 sq ft) where they were able to purchase holiday decorations, crafts and gift-wrap without making a separate stop. Frank's was pleased with the results, and the following year, the company operated 100 of the temporary stores. Indeed, Christmas decorations and crafts had become increasingly important lines to Frank's, helping to compensate for the seasonal sales declines in gardening supplies. Sales in 1992 grew to $558 million, a seven percent increase over the previous year, yet higher costs and interest on General Host's debt caused its profits to decline, from $8.7 million in 1991 to $2.9 million in 1992.

=== Frank's SuperCrafts ===
In 1993, the company launched Frank's SuperCrafts, opening two stores in the Detroit area. Designed as "superstores," the SuperCrafts stores encompassed 20,000 square feet (1,900 m^{2}) of retail space, allowing for a wider selection of craft supplies and home and holiday decorations, while incorporating in-store framing shops and floral arrangement services. Moreover, the stores featured hundreds of craft project displays, giving customers creative ideas and allowing them to see firsthand completed projects. A third SuperCrafts store opened in Philadelphia in 1994, and two more followed the same year; one each in New Jersey and Chicago.

=== Money cuts ===
By 1994, in fact, General Host's headlong expansion had come to an end, as a series of new stores proved unprofitable. In January, Frank's announced the closure of 26 stores, most of which were in the Nashville, Tennessee, area and in Florida. Company officials announced that such sales and closings would save General Host $3.8 million annually; other cuts were to come in $25 million worth of inventory, all of which would help service General Host's $238 million in debt.

=== Bankruptcy and liquidation ===
In February 2001, the company filed for Chapter 11 bankruptcy because it could not afford to pay its vendors. Matters were taken to bankruptcy court, where questions arose as to whether or not Frank's could avoid shutting down its retail stores. The matter was resolved, and the company was able to recover and continue full operation.

In September 2004, company officials again filed for Chapter 11. The company was heavily in debt, particularly in relation to their vendors. On September 8, of that year the decision was finally made to cease the operation of each of its 170 stores. Agreements were made with Kimco Capital Liquidation Company, which allowed for closing-down sales to be held in every outlet. After the closure of Frank's, the buildings—with a unique half outdoor, half indoor layout — were slow to be reoccupied in an over-built retail market.
