= George S. Ward =

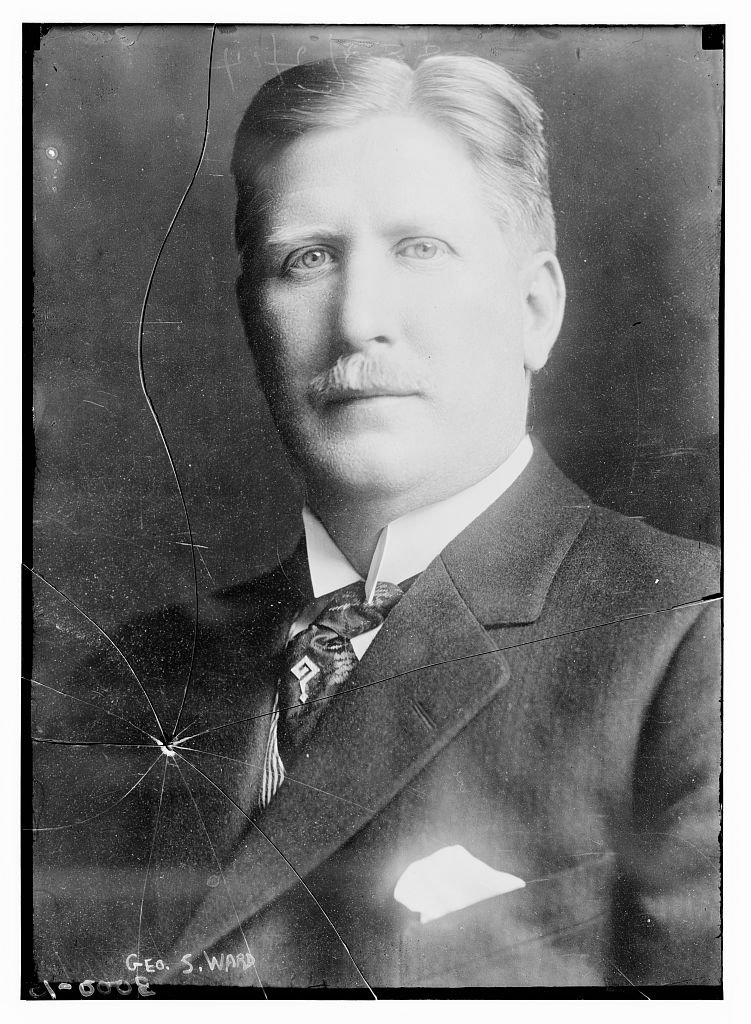

George Summerville Ward (1867 – September 3, 1940), was president of the Ward Baking Company and he was vice president of the Brooklyn Tip-Tops, the Federal League baseball club.

== Biography ==
Ward was born January 1, 1867, in Pittsburgh. He had a son, Walter Stevenson Ward, who in 1922, shot and killed a man named Clarence Melvin Peters, who he claimed had been blackmailing him. George died on September 3, 1940, in Havana, Cuba.
