= Tam O'Shanter Inn =

Restaurant in Los Angeles, California, U.S.

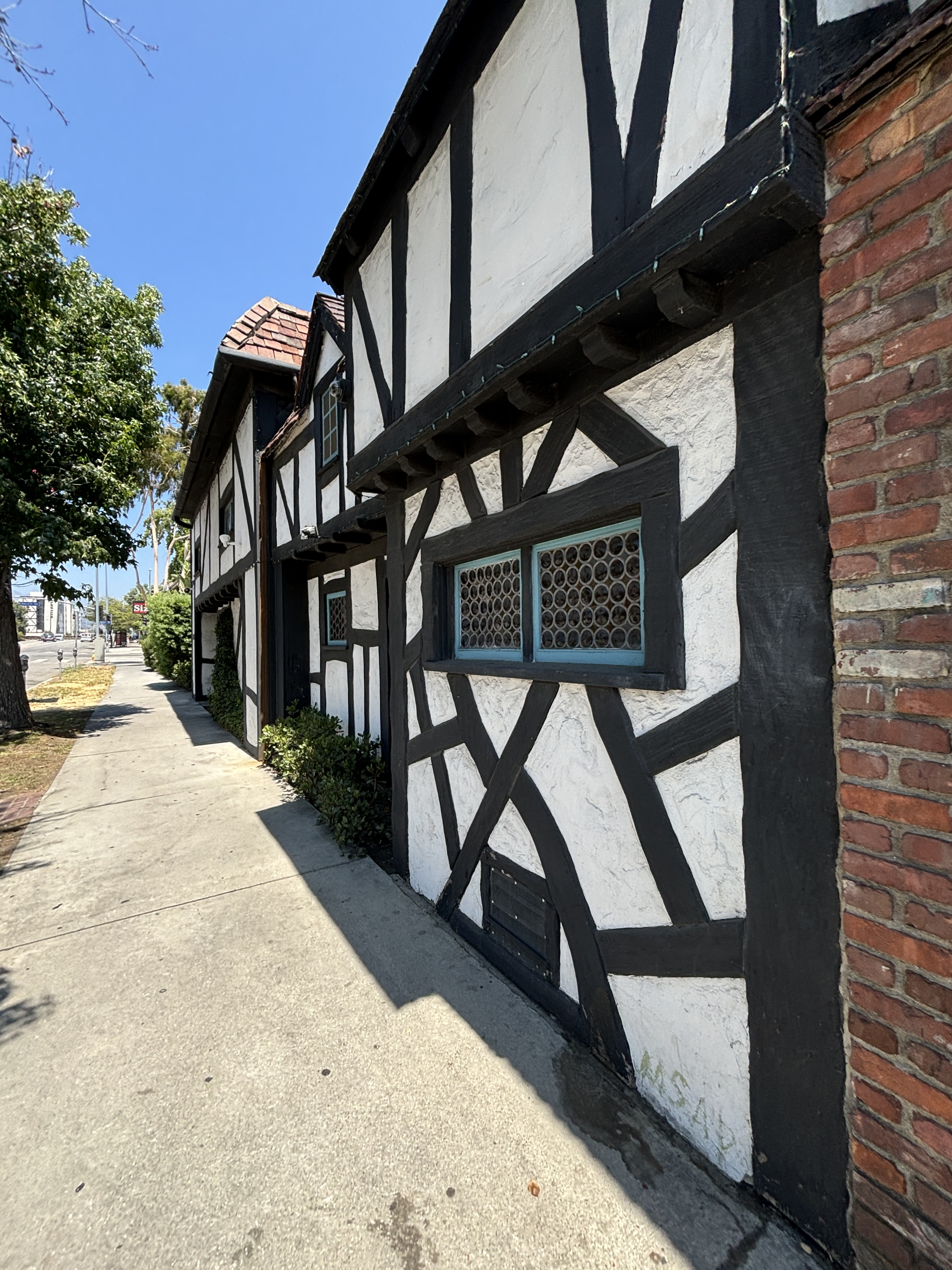
- Interactive map of Tam O'Shanter Inn

Restaurant information
- Established: June 26, 1922; 104 years ago
- Owner: Lawry's Restaurant Group
- Previous owner: Lawerence Frank
- Location: 2980 Los Feliz Blvd., Los Angeles, Los Angeles, California, 90039, United States
- Coordinates: 34.12547°N 118.2642°W
- Website: www.lawrysonline.com/tam-o-shanter/

The Tam O'Shanter Inn (colloquially known as The Tam) is one of Los Angeles' oldest restaurants. Established in 1922, it serves hearty pub fare with a touch of Scottish flair, and is known for its prime rib and Yorkshire pudding. It is located in Atwater Village at 2980 Los Feliz Boulevard at the corner of Boyce Avenue. Walt Disney was a frequent patron.

== History ==
The Tam O'Shanter Inn was established by Lawrence Frank and Walter Van de Kamp, founders of Van de Kamp's Holland Dutch Bakeries, who later created the Lawry's restaurant chain. They commissioned Harry Oliver to design the building. He constructed the Storybook Style building aided by movie studio carpenters. The Tam O'Shanter Inn opened in June 1922 and was a success. The owner said, "Every piece of wood which was used in this structure was thrown into fire first with the result that we never had to paint it and it got more beautiful as the years went by." (L.L.Frank to B.Stohler)

It was remodeled in 1968 and renamed the "Great Scot", but in 1982 returned to the original name "The Tam O'Shanter Inn". The decor features English and Scottish medieval weapons, kilts, and family coats of arms and medieval family crests. In 2018, it opened an outdoor patio space.

In March 2022, Tam O'Shanter Inn celebrated its 100-year anniversary.

== Gallery ==
Walt Disney, Tam O'Shanter founder Lawrence Frank, and designer Harry Oliver at the Tam' O'Shanter Inn, 1960

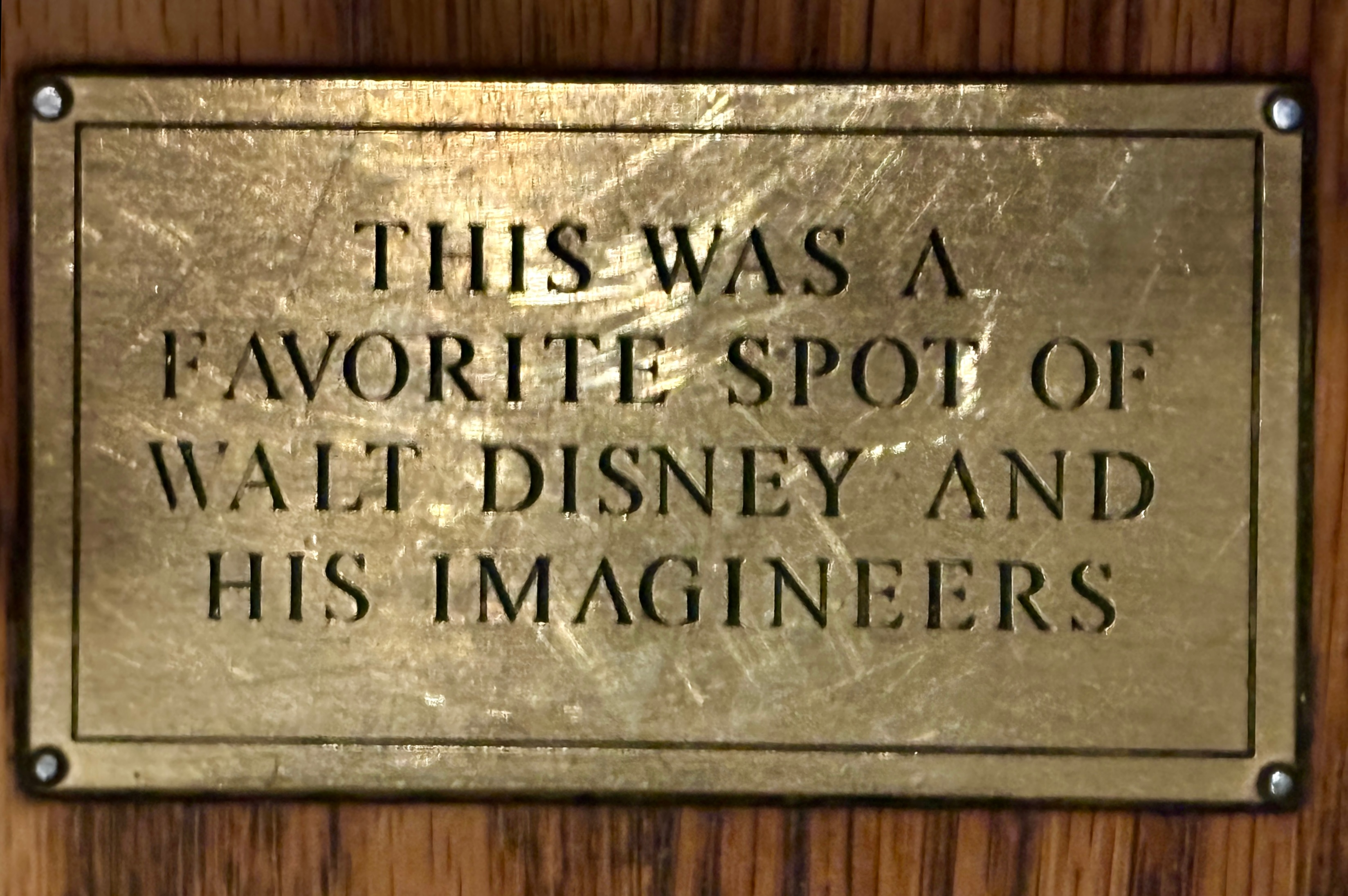
Walt Disney's favorite spot plaque

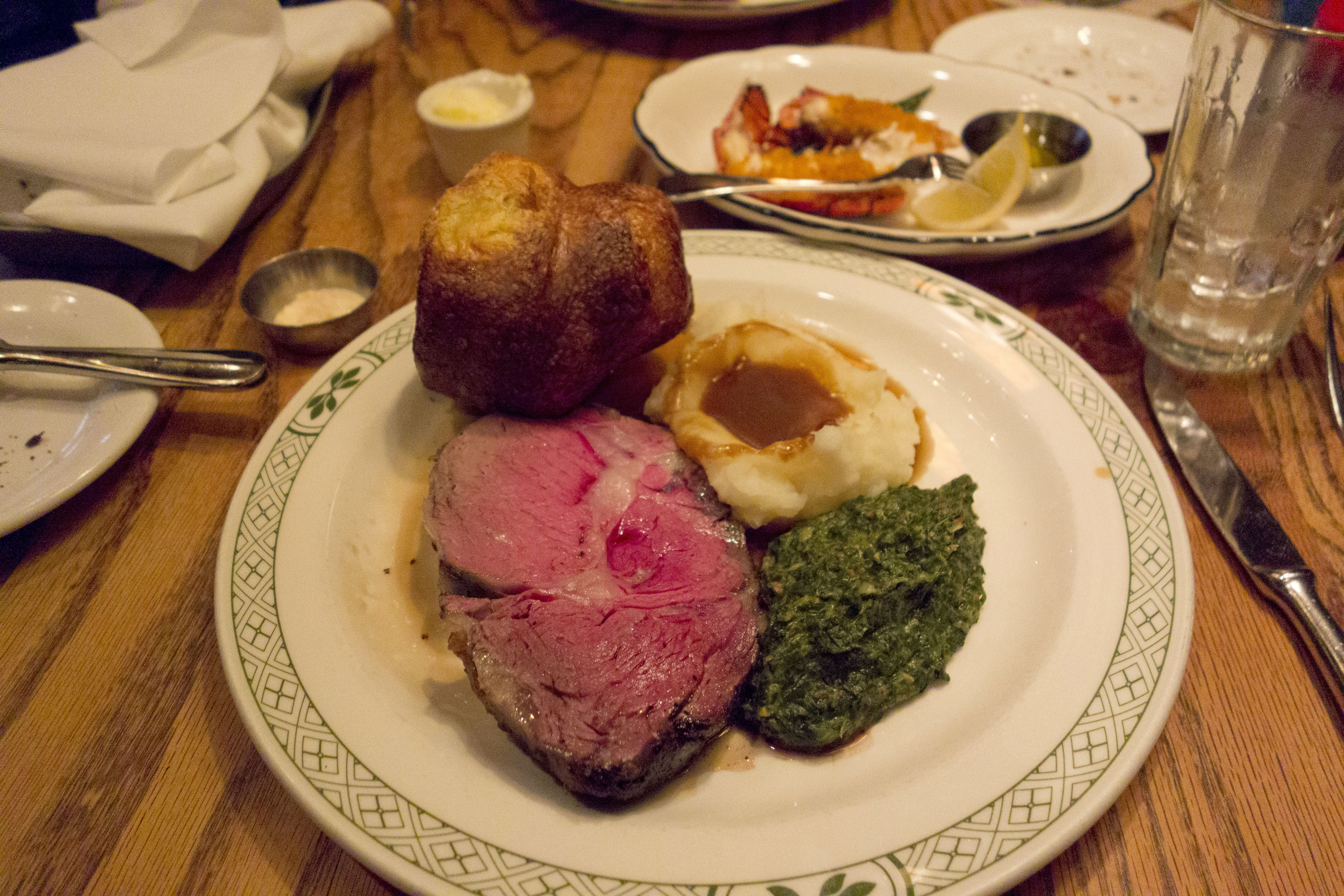
The restaurant's prime rib and Yorkshire pudding

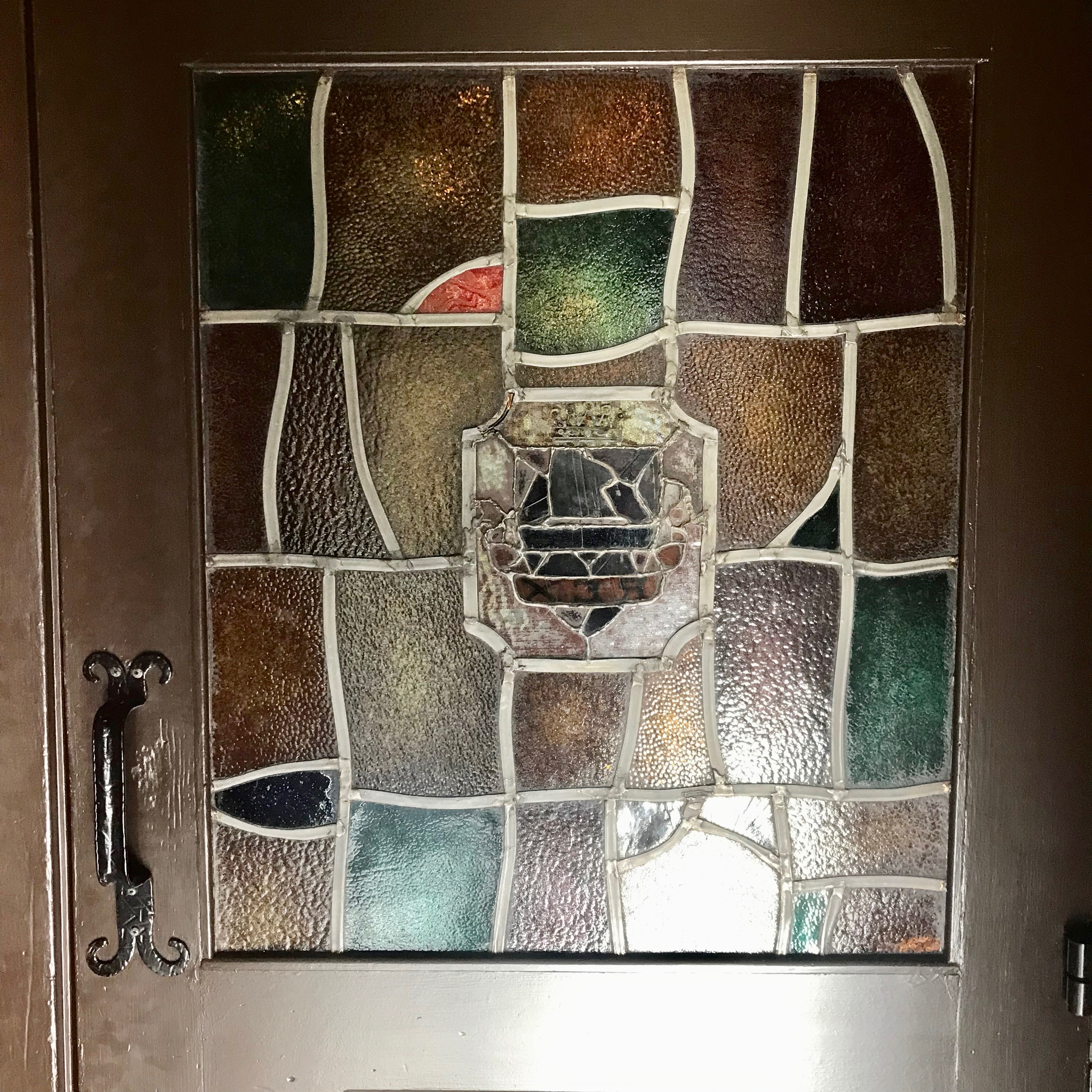
Stained glass on entry door

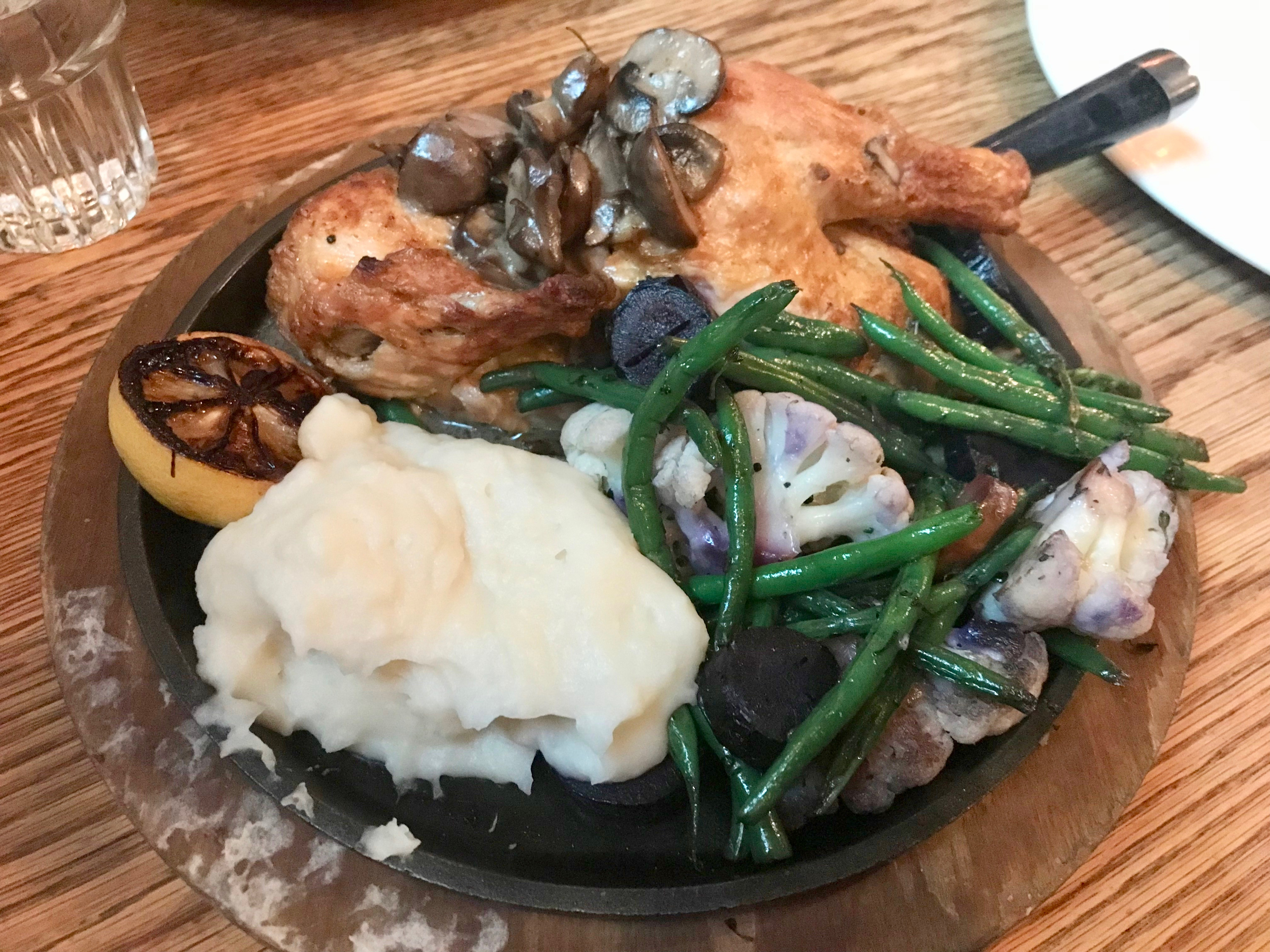
Roasted jidori chicken platter

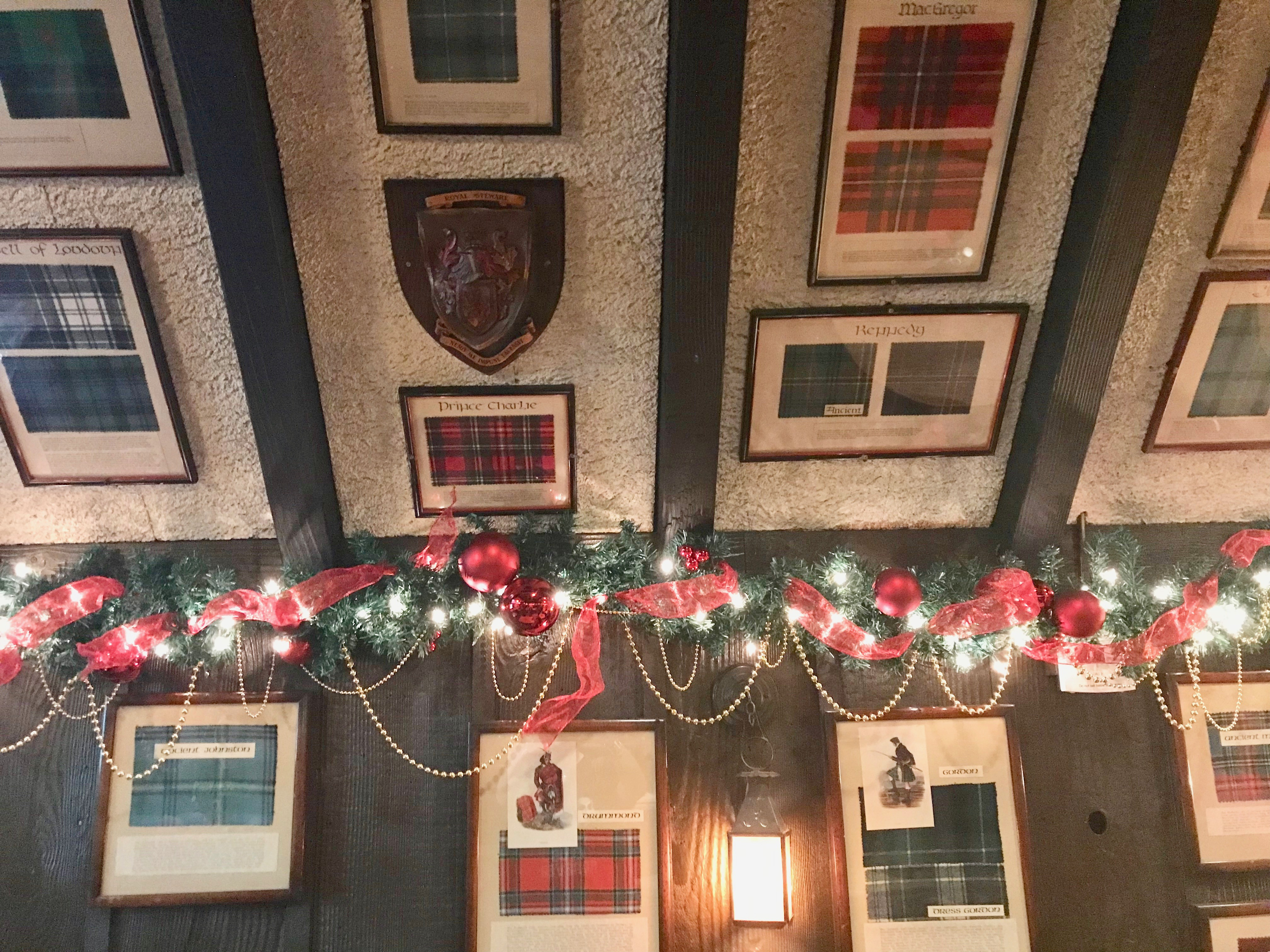
Samples of tartan cloth on display

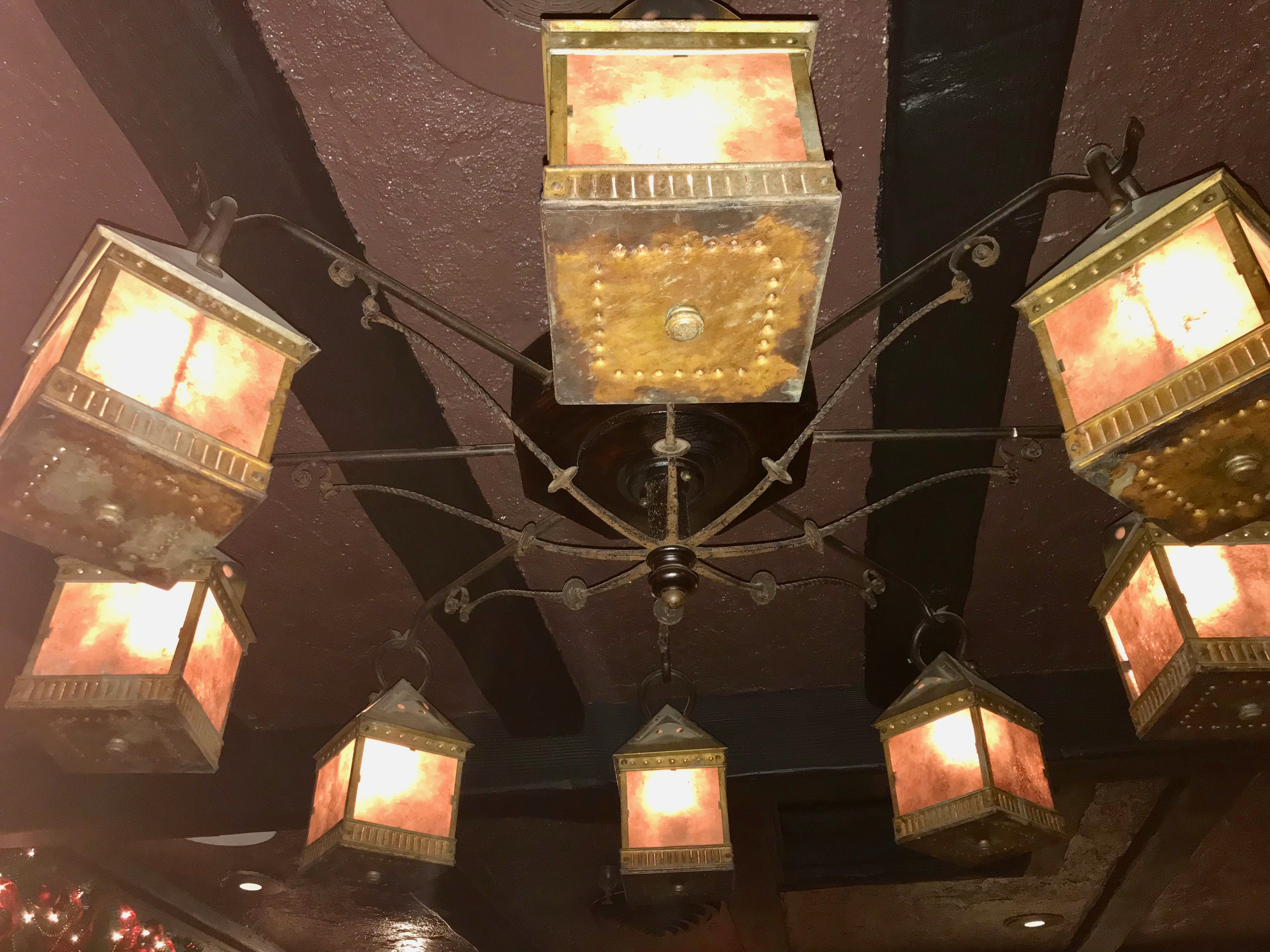
A rustic chandelier in the restaurant foyer

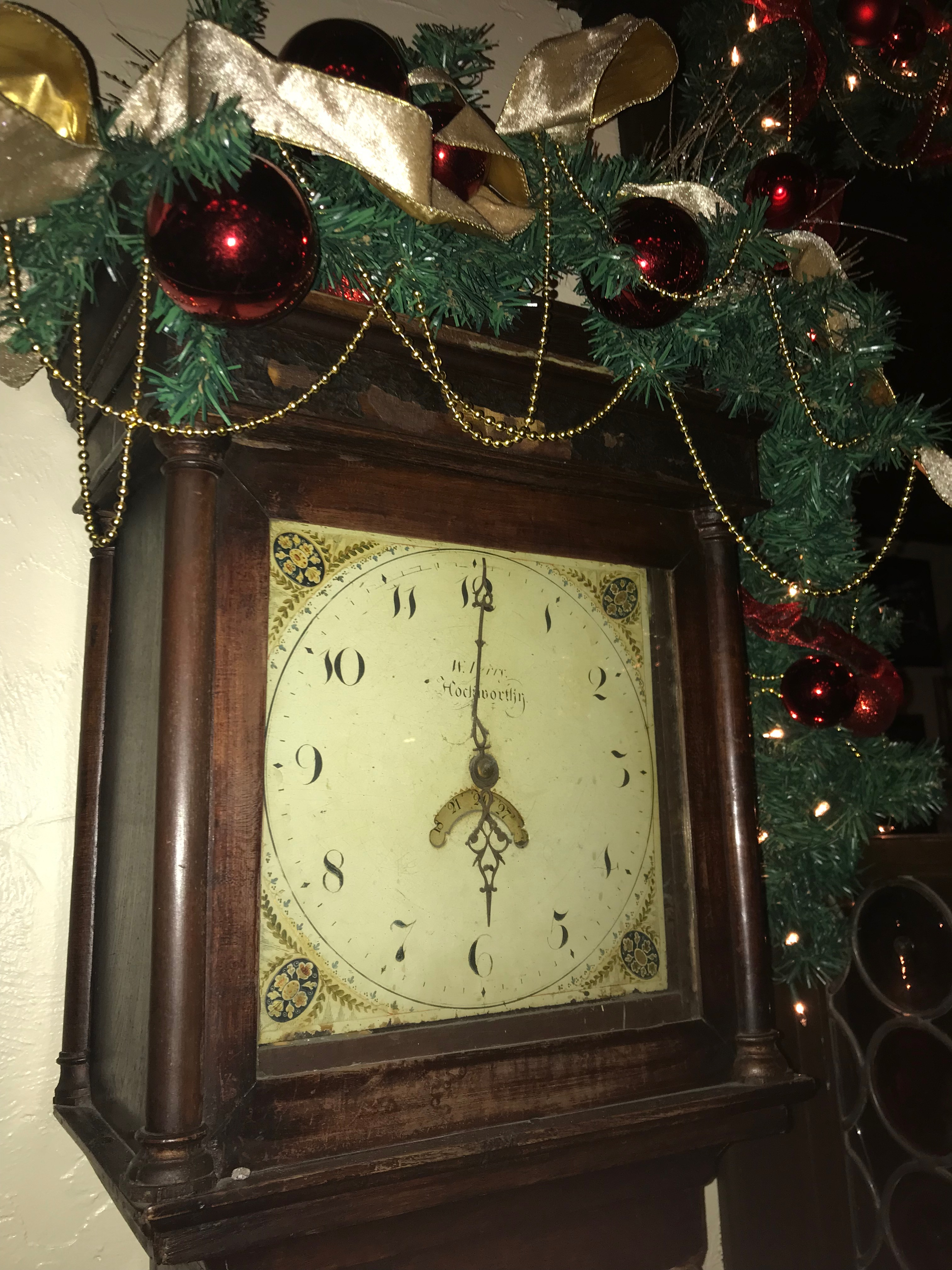
A grandfather clock in the foyer, adorned for the winter holidays

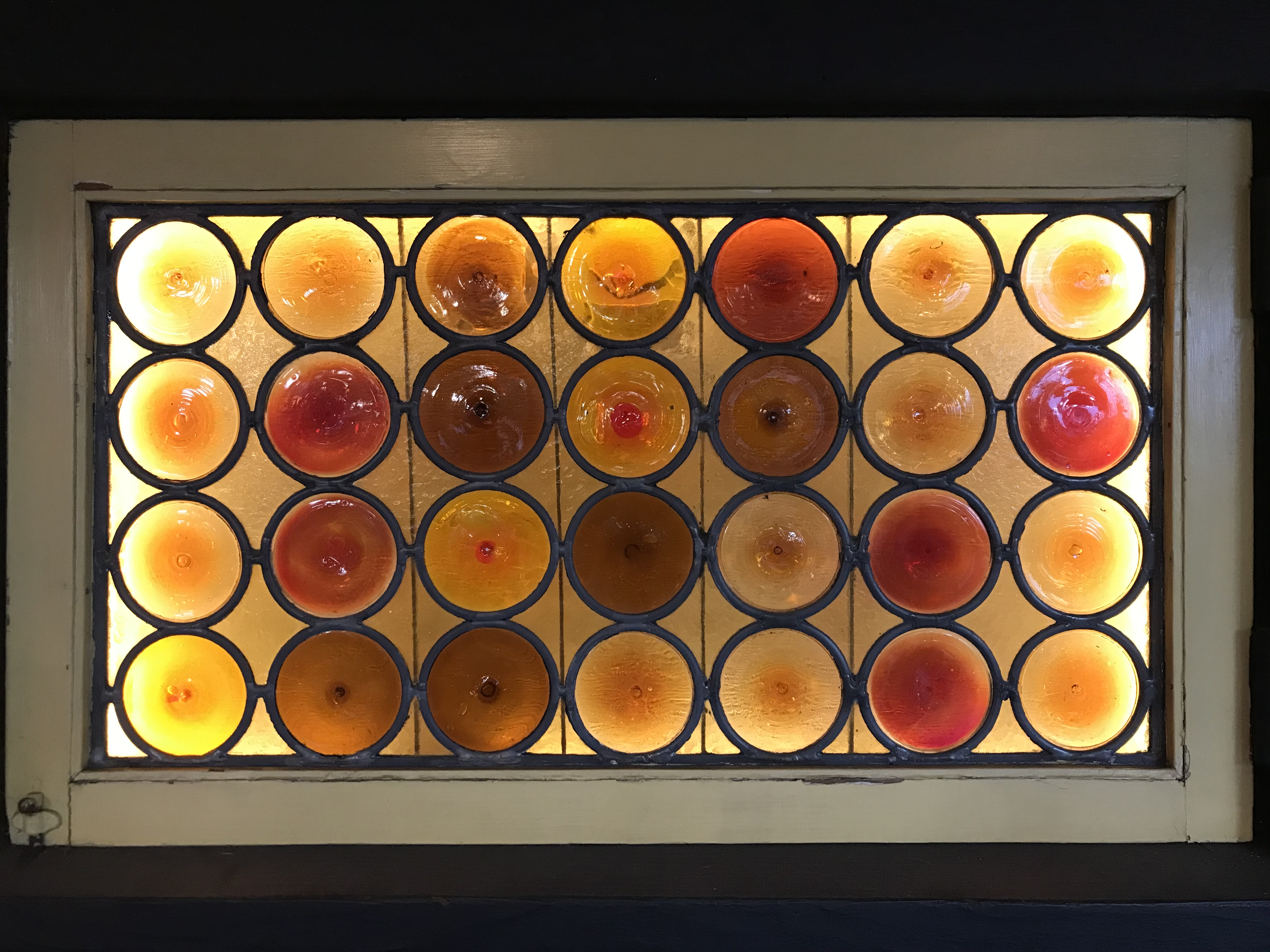
Glass rondel windows add a fanciful touch to the atmosphere

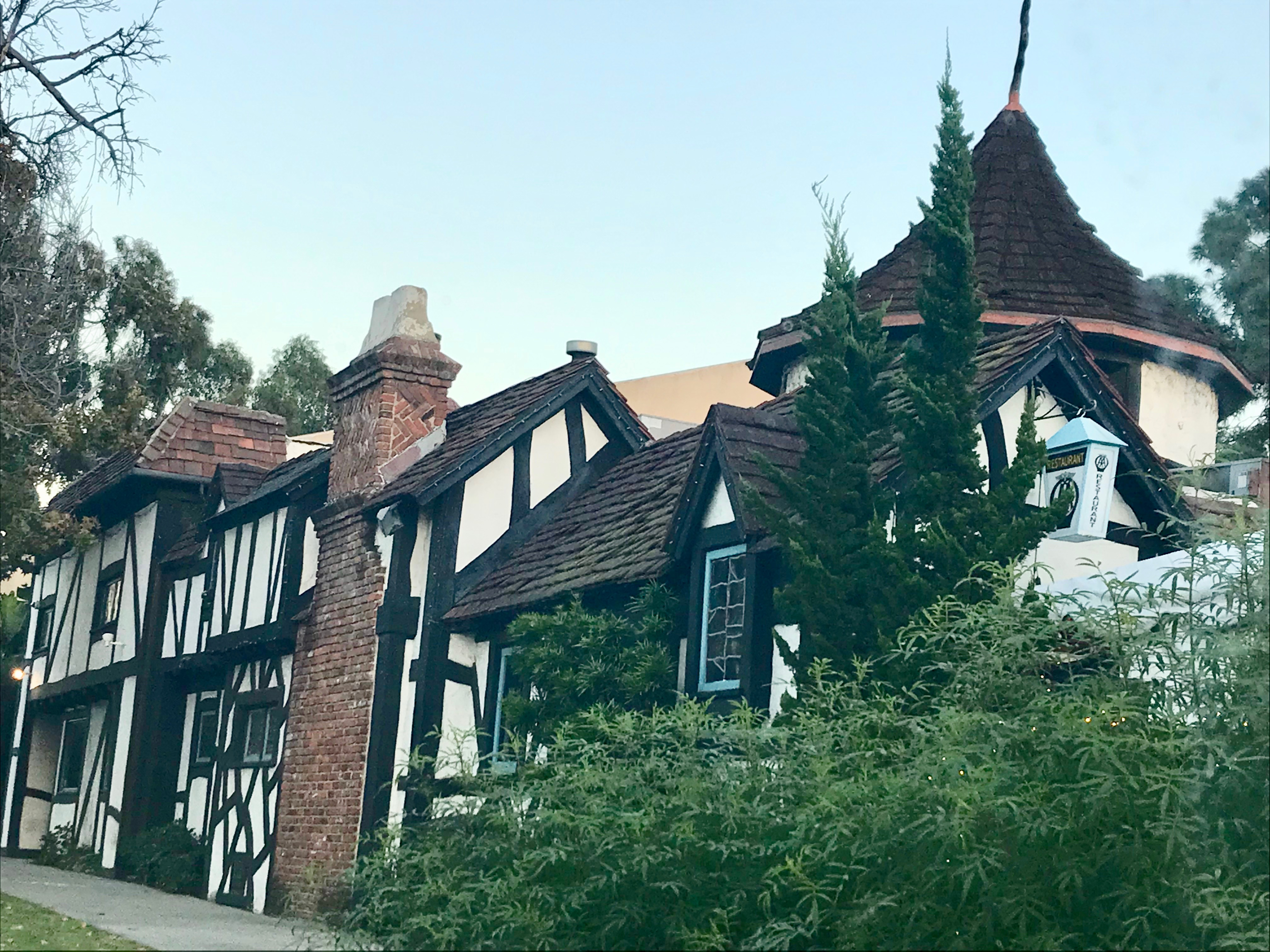
Front exterior of the Tam O'Shanter

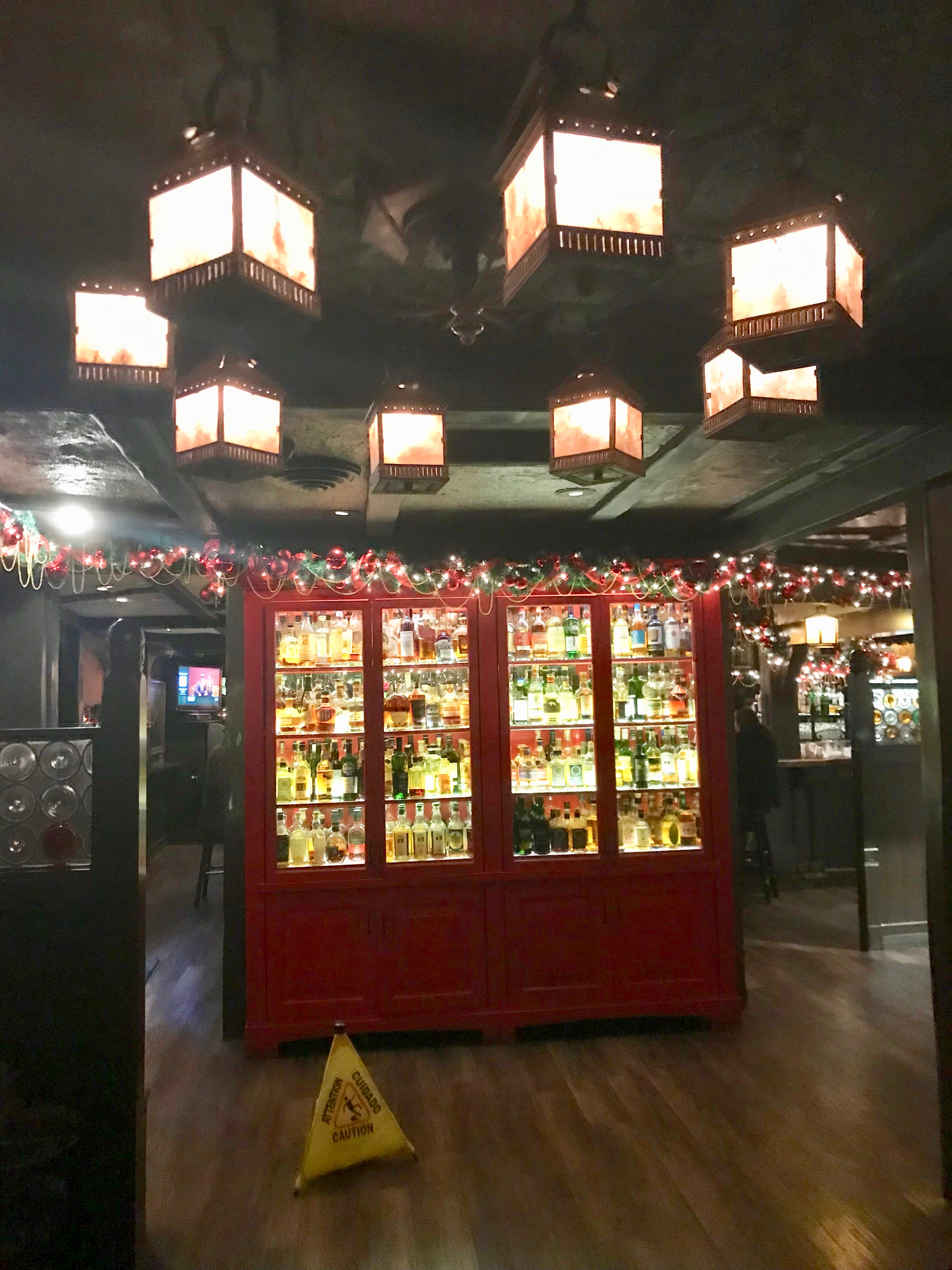
Case of Scotch whiskey in the restaurant foyer
