= Van de Kamp's Holland Dutch Bakeries =

Food brand

- Company type: Private
- Industry: baked goods
- Founded: 1915; 111 years ago
- Founders: Lawrence Frank, Theodore J. Van de Kamp, Henrietta Van de Kamp, Marion Van de Kamp
- Defunct: 1990; 36 years ago
- Fate: Bankrupt
- Headquarters: Los Angeles, California, United States
- Area served: western United States

Van de Kamp's Holland Dutch Bakeries was a brand of breads and assorted pastry products, frozen fish entrees, and prepared dinners formerly owned by General Baking plus a regional chain of regional bakery/restaurants. Established by one of the founders of both Los Angeles' iconic Tam O'Shanter Inn and the Lawry's restaurant chain and seasoned salt empire, it went bankrupt in 1990.

== History ==
Van de Kamp's Holland Dutch Bakeries was founded in 1915 as a Los Angeles potato chip stand by Theodore J. Van de Kamp, his sisters Marian and Henrietta, and Henrietta's husband Lawrence L. Frank, all recent transplants from Milwaukee, Wisconsin. The first stand was operated from an eight foot frontage at 236 ½ South Spring Street adjacent to the Saddle Rock Café—the very heart of Los Angeles at the time. They expanded the business to baked goods, and by the mid-1950s had become a regional bakery/restaurant chain. At the company’s height, 320 Van de Kamp’s Holland Dutch Bakers dotted the West Coast from California to Washington. In 1930 the company built a large bakery and administrative offices to support its growth in Glassell Park, Los Angeles. The Van de Kamp Bakery Building was designed by New York architect J. Edwin Hopkins. The company's trademark blue windmills featured on their bakery store signs and atop their chain of restaurants that were known throughout the region. The restaurants were designed by Harold Bissner Jr. Its slogan was to capitalize on the association with Dutch cleanliness and freshness: "Made Clean, Kept Clean, Sold Clean". Following the death of Theodore van de Kamp in 1956, the bakery was acquired by General Baking Company. The company was sold to private investors in 1979, and closed in bankruptcy in 1990. Today, there are few remnants of the famous windmills. A former Van de Kamp Holland Dutch bakery in Arcadia, CA was converted to a Denny's restaurant in 1989 and still features a fully restored windmill.

=== In the media ===
Several former employees of the bakery were interviewed, and the original bakery featured, in Visiting... with Huell Howser Episode 802.

== Ralphs supermarkets ==
The Van de Kamp's brand was also used by Ralphs and sister company Food 4 Less supermarket chains for their line of private-label baked goods. Products were discontinued in 2018.

== Resurrection of Van de Kamp baked goods ==
In 2023, Kathryn Van de Kamp, the great granddaughter of founder Theodore J. Van de Kamp, secured the trademark for the baked goods and began to sell classic Van de Kamp baked goods made from the original recipes at farmers' markets within Orange County, California, and via the internet.

== Frozen foods ==
Sometime after Theodore van de Kamp's death in 1956, the frozen food division was sold off.

Over the years the Van de Kamp brand had been owned by Pillsbury, Pet, Inc., Van De Kamp's, Inc., and later Aurora Foods.

The Van de Kamp's brand was acquired by Pinnacle Foods, Inc., and then merged with Conagra Brands, which currently owns the rights to the Van de Kamp’s frozen fish and seafood products.

In June 2025, Conagra signed an agreement with High Liner Foods to sell its Van de Kamp's and Mrs. Paul's frozen seafood brands for $55 million in cash. The transaction closed at the end of July 2025.

== Relatives and related ventures ==
Theodore's brother-in-law Lawrence L. "Lawry" Frank and brother Walter Van de Kamp founded the Tam O'Shanter Inn in 1922 and later the Lawry's Restaurants chain in 1938.

A nephew of the bakery's co-founders, John K. Van de Kamp (1936–2017), served as the 37th Los Angeles County District Attorney from 1975 and 1981 and later as the 28th Attorney General of California from 1983 and 1991.

== See also ==
- List of bakeries

== Images ==
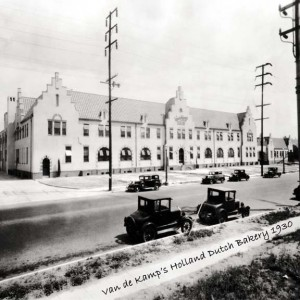

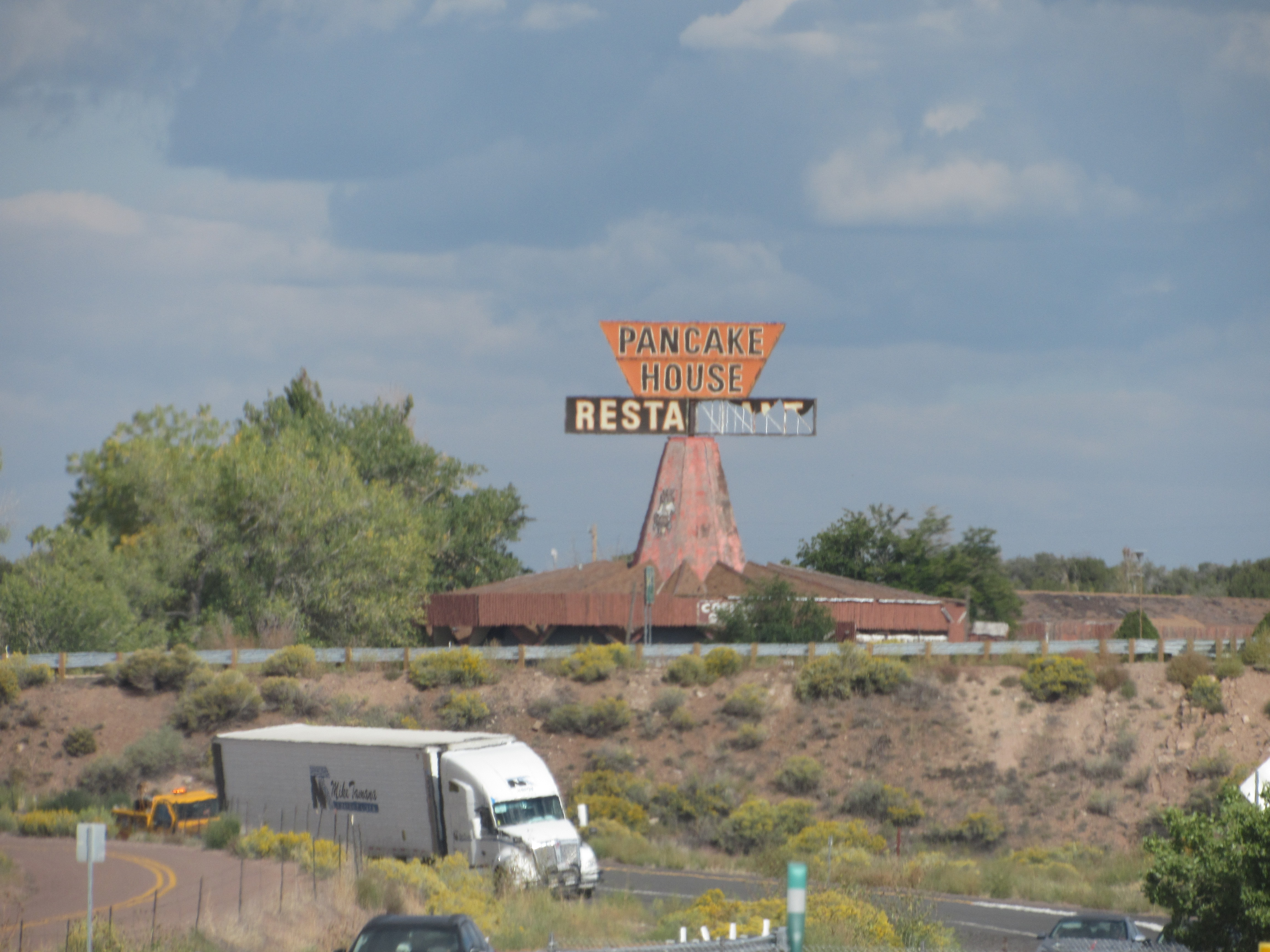
The remains of a pancake house originally built as a Van de Kamp bakery in Houck, AZ.

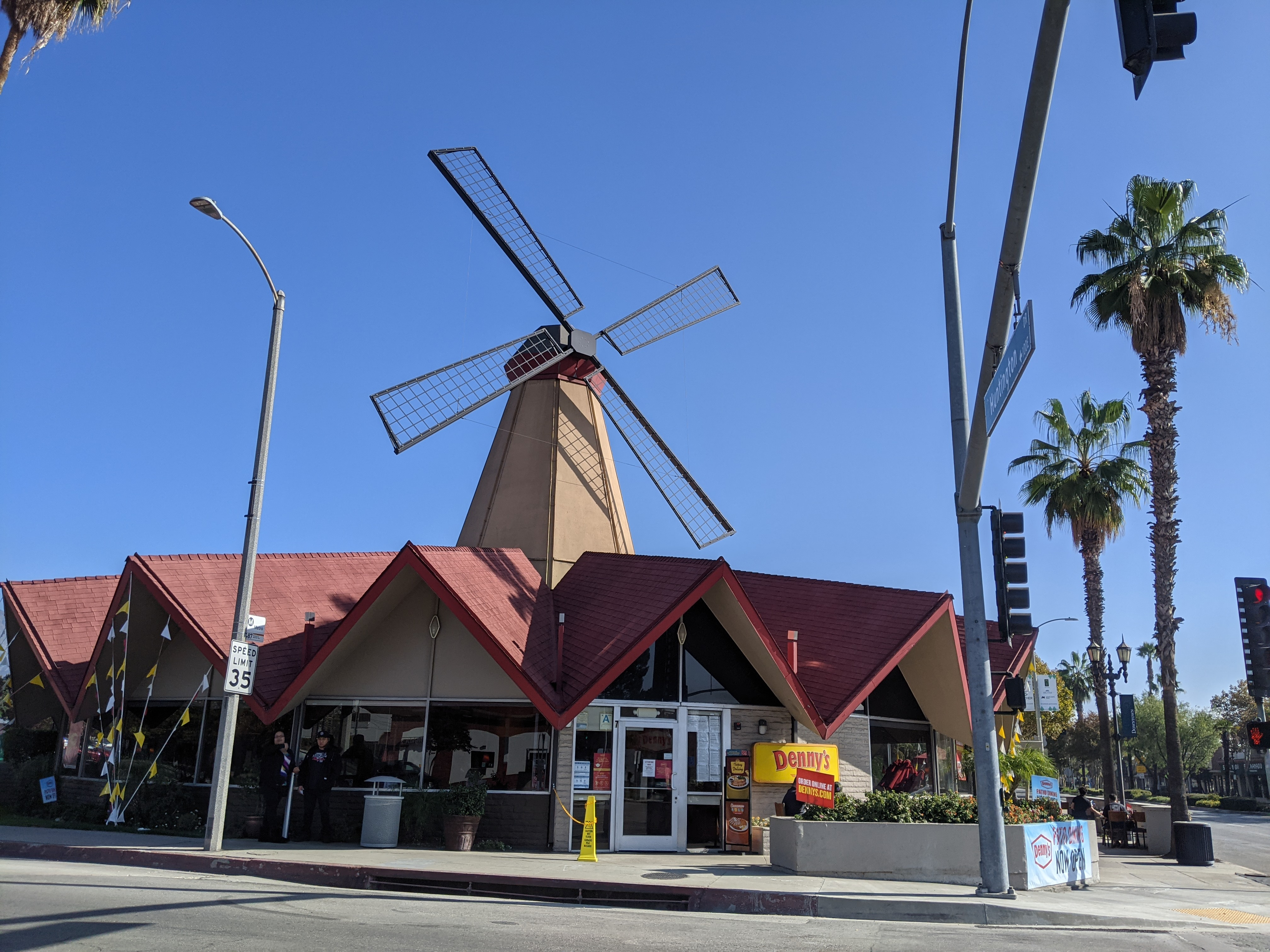
The Denny’s in Arcadia, California that was formerly a Van de Kamp’s.

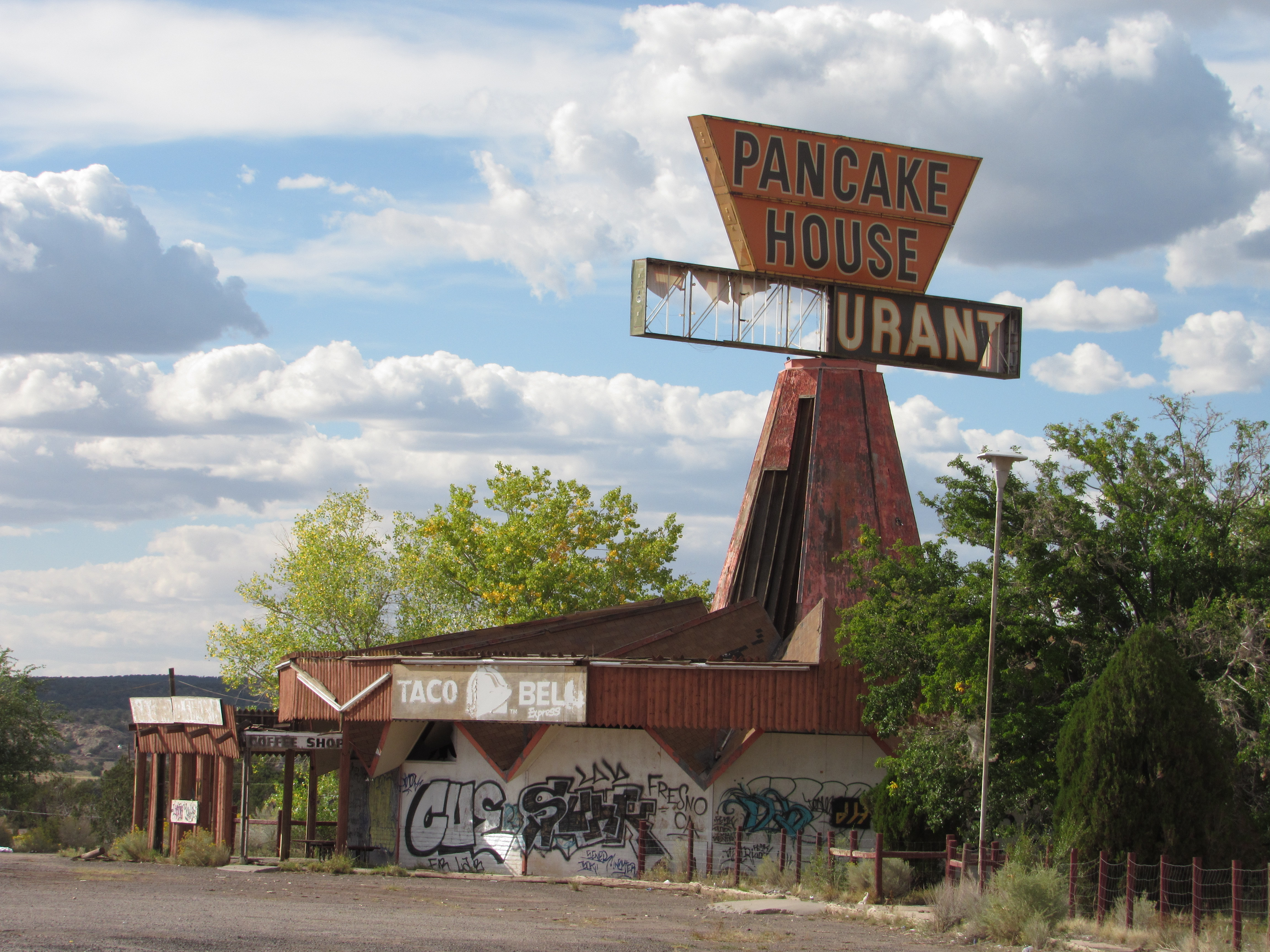
Remains of a Van de Kamps in Houck, Arizona
