= General Host =

Former American bakery chain and food producer

General Host Corp.
- Formerly: General Baking Company
- Type: Public
- Industry: Bakery
- Predecessor: Brunner Baking Company; Ontario Baking Company; Collins Baking Company
- Founded: June 1911; 115 years ago in New York City
- Founder: William B. Ward
- Headquarters: New York City, US
- Key people: Harris J. Ashton (chairman, 1977); Richard Pistell (president, 1969)
- Products: Bond Bread
- Subsidiaries: Frank's Nursery & Crafts

General Host Corp. (formerly known as General Baking Company) was a New York-based food and food-related company. It was also the owner of Frank's Nursery & Crafts until the company's bankruptcy in 2004.

== History ==
=== Early years and Bond Bread ===
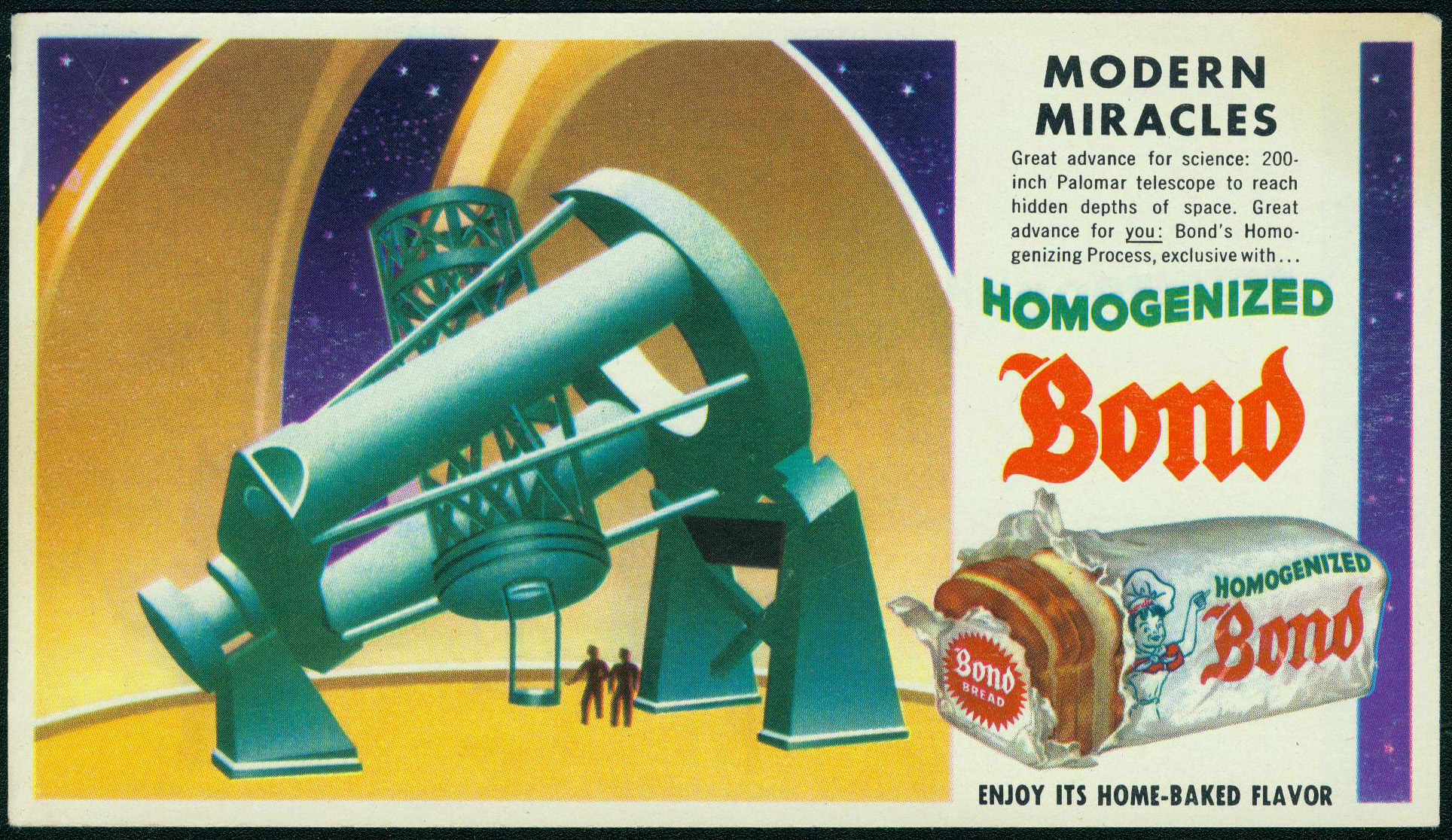
Print advertisement for Bond Bread, unknown year

The history of General Host is traced to June 1911, when the General Baking Co. was incorporated in New York as an amalgamation of 21 baking companies from 12 different states, through the merger of the Brunner, Collins and Ontario Baking Companies. The footprint of the new company consisted of no more than two facilities in each city in which it is present. From its inception, the company was publicly traded, beginning with a US$20 million stock on the New York Stock Exchange, and US$5 million bond offering. The newly formed company was led by William B. Ward, who had run the Ward Baking Company's factory in the Bronx. Upon formation, it controlled 20 percent of the American bread market. Immediately after formation, the company's first acquisition took place, that of Louisville-based Grocers' Baking Company and its subsidiary, Grocer's Biscuit Company. In 1912, Frank R. Shepherd and William H. Collins, former manager of Collins Baking Company, were the company's vice-president and president, respectively, while Lewis J. Kolb was the chairman of the company's board.

In 1917, the company had plants in 27 cities, including a couple of plants around Boston, New York, operating under the names Fox Bakery and Ferguson Baking Company; Deininger and Rochester Baking Companies in Rochester, New York; and Collins and Brunner Baking Companies in Buffalo, New York.

The company operated 40 bakeries by 1922 and was the largest wholesale bakery in the New York metropolitan area; including Dexter's Bakery of Springfield, Vermont, which was a strategic purchase to penetrate Central New England. A three way, US$400 million merger in 1925 among General Host (then General Baking Company), Ward Baking Company and Continental Baking Company enlarged the company further, leading to a 10% stake in the United States national bread business and 157 plants (18 from Ward, 33 from General and 106 from Continental). Coincident with the announcement of this merger, Paul H. Helms was named President of General, and the company was re-incorporated in Baltimore, Maryland. By 1930 the company owned 50 plants serving cities in 18 states. 1931 found the first addition of Vitamin D into the bread making process, which baking and packaging took place the night before delivery at the time, using a method developed by the Paediatric Research Foundation of Toronto and the Wisconsin Alumni Research Foundation. Also in 1931, the company recapitalized, eliminating a holding company, General Baking Corporation, and converting all stock to holdings in the core company, General Baking Company, which would be traded on the New York Stock Exchange.

The production of bread, sold under the trade name of "Bond Bread", accounted for over 90 percent of its sales and production averaged nearly 1.5 million loaves per day. In 1923, Bond Bread was noted as the best-selling brand of bread in the United States. The Bond Bread formula, established circa 1915, was based on the review of 43,040 contest participants who sent the company recipes and samples of their home made bread making. The addition of Vitamin D to the recipe in 1931 was the first change to this formula introduced. The company's brands also included "Mothers Bread", "Bond Rye Bread" and "Butter Krust Bread". One of the company's biggest competitors was Continental Baking which sold its main product under the name Wonder Bread.

=== 1950s and 1960s ===
The company became the owners of Van de Kamp's in 1956 after the death of that bakery's founder. The purchase expanded General Baking to the west coast. By the 1960s, the company had increased competition due to other baking conglomerates and supermarkets that began installing on-site bakeries.

By mid-1965, General Baking lost more than $1.86-million in the first half of the year and was taken over by the Goldfield Corporation, which was head by Richard C. Pistell. Under Pistell, General Baking was reorganized and company started to show a profit the following year. The company started to move away from its baking roots through diversification. The Van de Kamp name was being used on a new line of frozen foods and quality candies.

Around 1966, General acquired two hotels located in Yellowstone Park, operated by the company's wholly owned subsidiary Yellowstone Park Company: Old Faithful Inn and Lake Hotel.

By 1967, the company made a US$2 million profit off of US$155 million in sales. As a result of the company's expansion outside of the baking industry, General Baking rename itself General Host.

In 1969, General and several other baking companies were found guilty of and fined in U.S. District Court for price fixing bread in the Philadelphia area, a practice that took place between 1964 and 1968, the indictment having been served 13 March 1968. (Note: The citation refers to part 1 of the article; part 2 can be found at https://www.newspapers.com/clip/20431592/pt2_bakers_fined/ .)

The company continued acquiring properties in the 1970s, for instance acquiring a chain of pretzel stands, Hot Sam, which was started in Detroit by Russian immigrant Julius Young in 1966.

With respect to governance, the company's president as of 1967 was Harris J. Ashton. Two years later, Richard Pistell was president, and Ashton would go on to become chairman of the company.

=== 1970s Expansion to meatpacking and frozen foods ===
The company owned several food companies by the 1970s, and the company began venturing into meatpacking and frozen foods, restaurants and hospitality. General also attempted a hostile takeover of the large meatpacking concern Armour and Company in 1969 and was able to acquire a controlling interest in the company. The takeover which was met with lawsuits filed by the Securities and Exchange Commission. Despite holding 57% of Armour's stock, General was unable to establish final control of the company and ended up selling its stake to Greyhound in 1970. With the proceeds of the Armour stake sale, General went on to buy the pork processing concern, Cudahy Packing Company.

By 1972, General had more than doubled its 1967 sales figure, to US$339 million.

In 1972, General Host and two executives were fined $16,000 for unsanitary conditions at a bakery. The conditions were originally discovered when a mouse was discovered sliced in a loaf of Bond bread. General sold off the majority of its Bond Bread baking division by 1972.

In 1979, General's contract to manage two hotels in Yellowstone Park was terminated due to "poor service" and inadequate maintenance of the properties, according to the National Park Service.

Also in 1979, General sold its Van de Kamp's bakery division, the largest retail bakery in California, to a group of private investors, returning control back to the West Coast. The group of investors included Jack W. Leeney, president of the division who became the new company's chief executive officer, and executive vice president Odell C. Nordberg, who became the new company's chief operating officer. General retained ownership of Van de Kamp's frozen food divisions.

With respect to governance, the company's chairman was Harris J. Ashton in 1977.

=== 1980s purchase of Frank's Nursery and bankruptcy ===
General purchased Hickory Farms in 1980 from its founder, Richard Ransom. In 1981, General divested part of its interest in meat processing subsidiary Cudahy Foods due to financial losses in the unit to a newly formed company, Bar-S, started by former executives from Cudahy. General retained the dry sausage and canned ham operations of Cudahy. As part of the divestment, General terminated 1,100 employees, shut four processing centers and thirteen distribution centers.

General Host purchased Frank's Nursery & Crafts in 1982 based on research showing higher operating profits for lawn and garden over food products.

In the mid-1980s, the company began selling off its food businesses, including its interest in Hickory Farms in 1986. General Host was the owner of the All American Gourmet Co. based in Orange County, California. In 1985 it sold 25% of the company through a public offering. The company sold its remaining 75% interest in the company to Kraft Foods in 1987. The company also sold its Van de Kamp's frozen foods division, the last of its Van de Kamp's operations, to Pillsbury in 1984.

== See also ==
- List of bakeries
- List of food companies
