= Ward Baking Company Building =

Building in Brooklyn, New York

Coordinates: 40°40′51.48″N 73°58′8.55″W

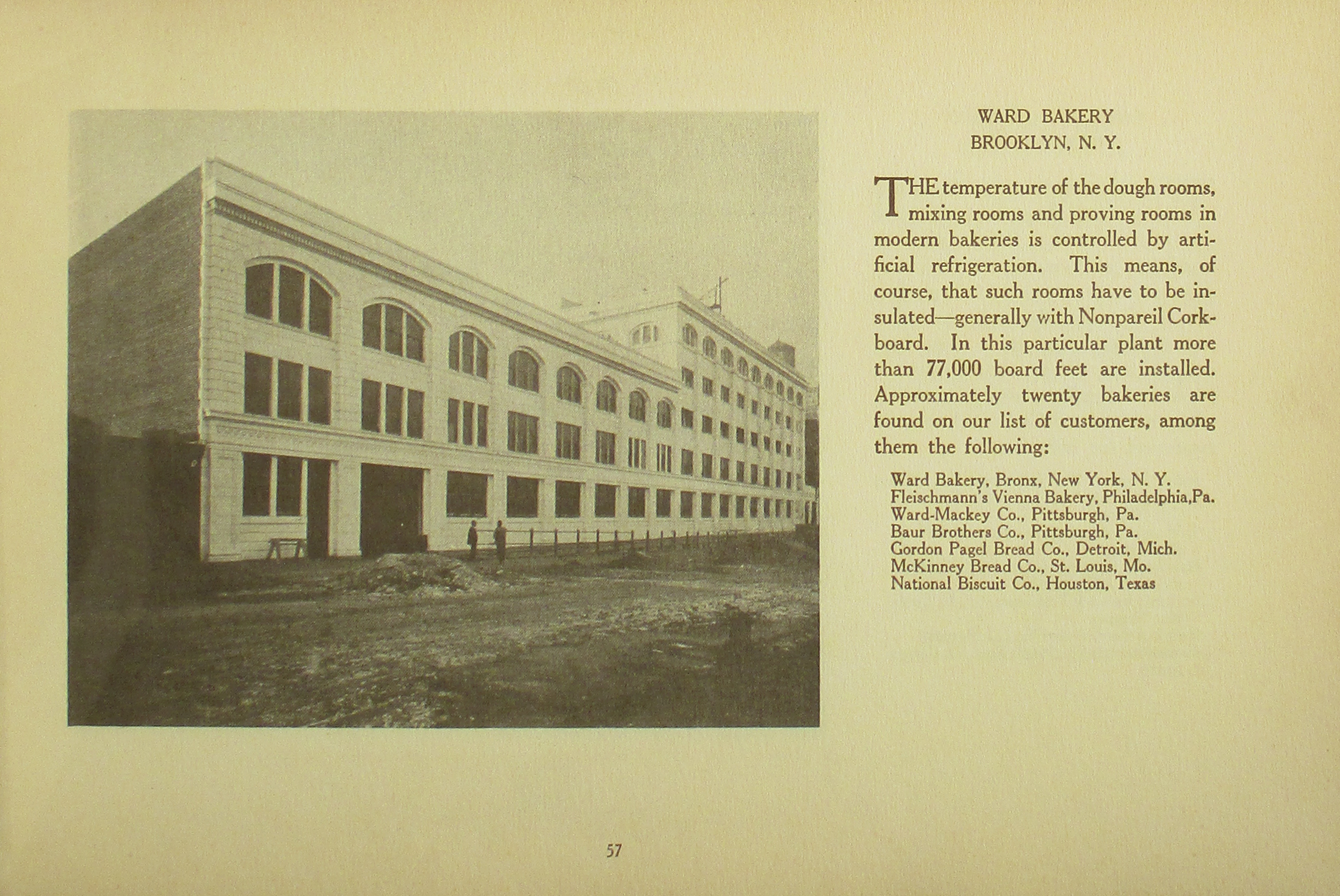
- Interactive map of the Ward Baking Company Building area

General information
- Status: Demolished
- Type: Bakery
- Location: 800 Pacific Street, Brooklyn, New York, United States
- Opened: 1911
- Demolished: 2007

Design and construction
- Architect: Corry B. Comstock

The Ward Baking Company Building was an industrial facility in Prospect Heights, Brooklyn, New York. It was constructed in 1911 by George S. Ward as a baking plant for the Ward Bread Company, which later became the Continental Baking Company.

According to the Ward Baking Company, the Ward Building housed the first "sanitary and scientific bakery in America." The building housed hundreds of workers who produced 250,000 loaves of bread per day.

It was demolished in 2007 to make way for Pacific Park.

== Building ==
The Ward Building stretched from the south side of Pacific Street to the north side of Dean Street, between Carlton and Vanderbilt Avenues, in Prospect Heights, Brooklyn.

The Ward Building was five stories tall, with a facade of glazed white terra cotta tiles. Grecian-inspired arches ran the length of the building, front and back. Ornamental detailing ran the length of the building. At one end stood a 120-foot (37 m) smoke stack, previously used in the baking process. It had six floors, a basement, and sub-basement, with a total area is more than 4 acres (16,000 m^{2}).

It received flour shipments via the adjacent rail lines.

== History ==
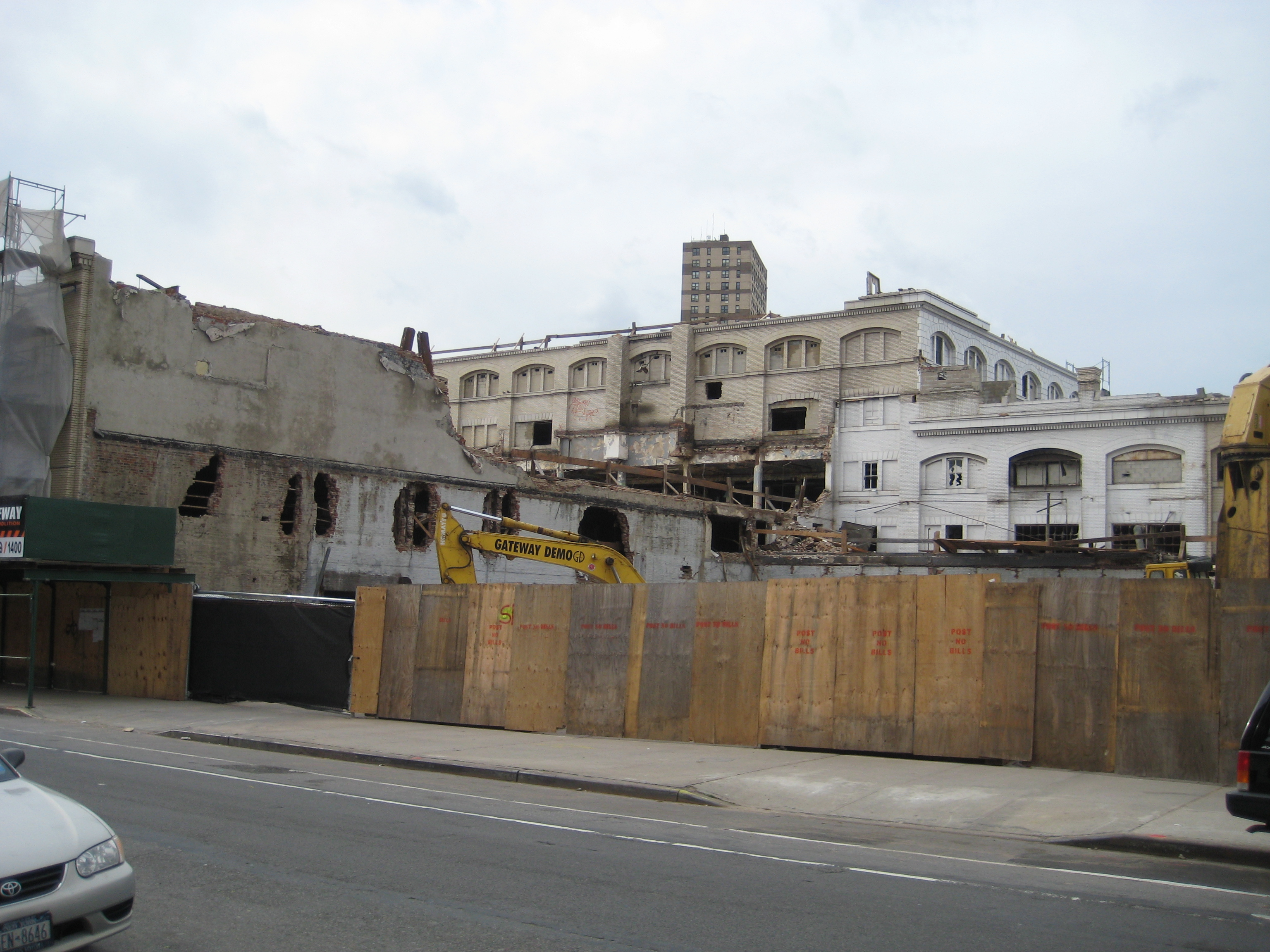
Demolition (May 2008)

In 1911, George S. Ward, President of the Ward Baking Company, built the Ward Building to accommodate a large industrial bakery. To prepare for designing the building, Ward and members of the architectural firm he hired, C. B. Comstock, went on a tour of buildings and manufacturing facilities in Europe. Corry B. Comstock also designed a similar factory in Buffalo, New York.

A 1921 Ward Bakery Publication,The Story of our Research Products described Ward as having “the courage and the pioneer spirit to erect the first sanitary and scientific bakery in America.” It also described the Ward Building as “the snow-white temple of bread-making cleanliness.”

The company was one of the largest commercial bakers in Brooklyn at the beginning of the 20th century.

In 1953, the Pechter Baking Company bought the plant. It was a Jewish company that made bagels and rye bread, among other products. During a delivery driver strike in 1957, they gave away products until a mob formed on the street and they had to stop.

In 1973, Pechter merged with another bakery to become Pechter Field's Bakery, and they continued to operate out of the factory on Pacific Street. The company went out of business and closed the bakery in 1995, partly due to the cost of maintaining the outdated facility. At the time, it was one of the last independent bakeries in the New York area.

A connected warehouse at 808 Pacific Street was used for a self-storage business as late as 2007.

== Demolition ==
In 2006, the New York City Landmarks Preservation Commission ruled that the building did not qualify as a landmark. The Atlantic Yards redevelopment project Environmental Impact Statement said that the building was not feasible to convert into housing. It was demolished in 2007-2008.

There is a monument to the baking plant near its former location.

== See also ==
- Brooklyn Tip-Tops
