= Continental Baking Company =

American company (1849–1995)

- Type: Private
- Industry: Food (Bakery)
- Founded: 1849; 177 years ago (as Ward Baking Company)
- Defunct: 1995; 31 years ago
- Successor: Interstate Bakeries Corporation, Hostess Brands
- Headquarters: New York City, New York, U.S.
- Key people: Robert Boyd Ward
- Products: Brands including: Wonder Bread, Twinkies

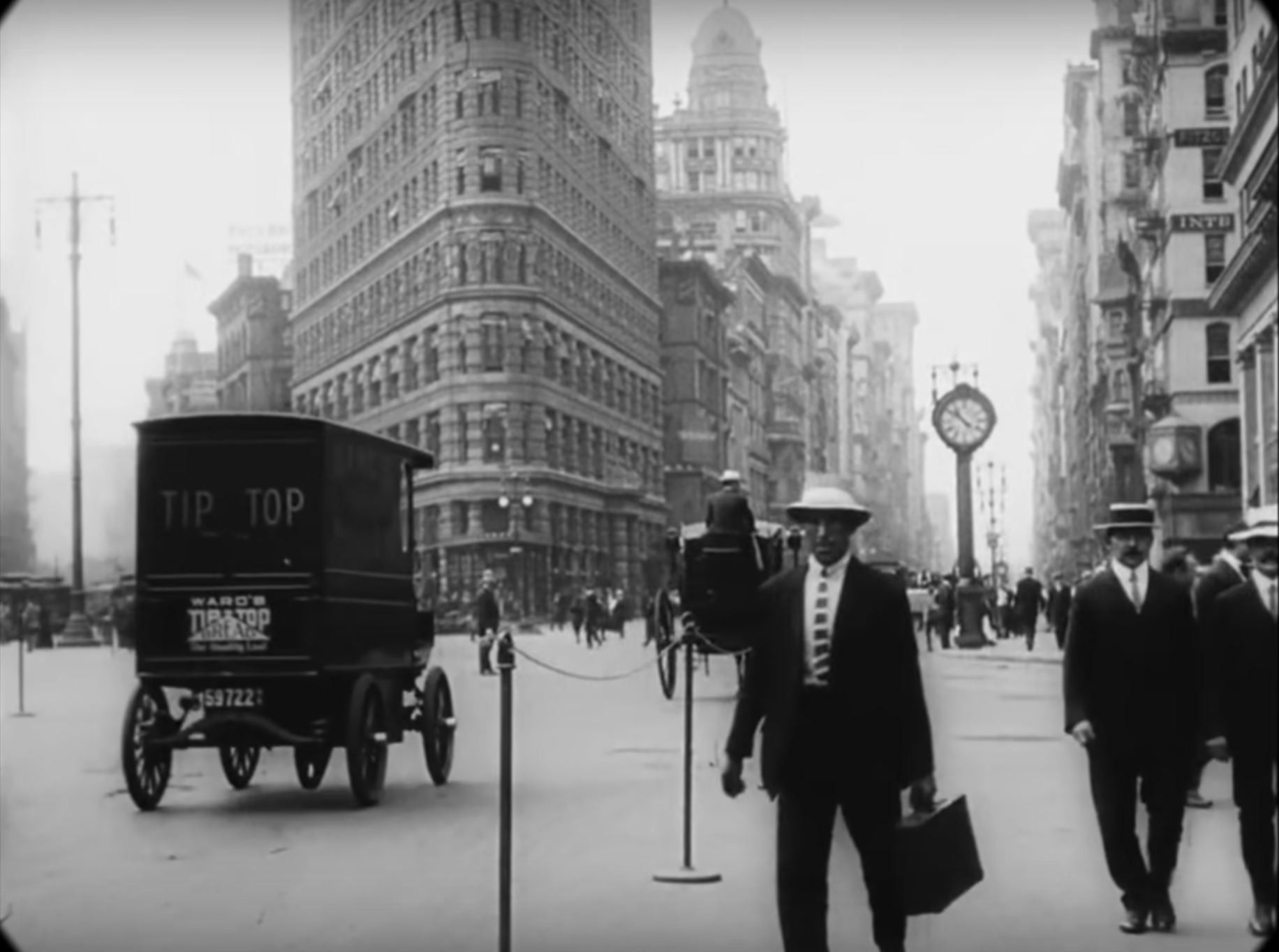
Delivery Wagon Automobile with Ward's Tip Top bread advertisement in front of Flatiron building, New York. 1911

The Continental Baking Company was one of the first bakeries to introduce fortified bread. It was the maker of the Twinkie and Wonder Bread. Through a series of acquisitions and mergers it became part of the former Hostess Brands company.

== History ==
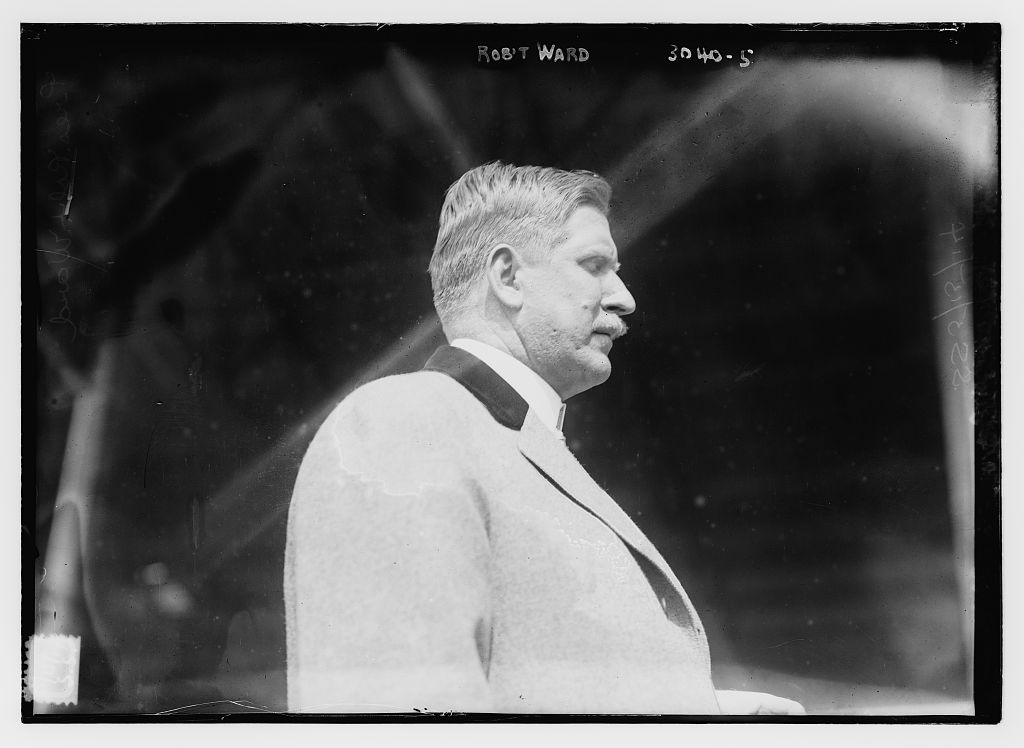
Robert Ward

In 1849, James Ward and his son, Hugh Ward, who came from Belfast, Ireland, opened a small bakery on Broome Street in New York City. In 1884, Hugh Ward and his son Robert Boyd Ward moved to Allegheny city (now, Pittsburgh) and opened a new bakery there.

The Ward Bread Company was organized by Robert B. Ward in New York, Brooklyn and Newark in 1900. Around 1910, The Ward's Bakeries built two big factories in Bronx, NY (143rd St. and Southern Boulevard) and Brooklyn, NY (Ward Baking Company Building at Vanderbilt Ave and Pacific Street), which "marks a triumphant return to New York". By November 1911, the company starts to sell their famous "Ward's Tip-top Bread" for 5 & 10 cents loaves.

In 1921, grandson William Ward took over the company and in 1925 renamed it the Continental Baking Company.

Continental Baking acquired the Wagner Baking Company in Detroit, Michigan and other 3 companies at the end of 1924. In 1925 it bought Taggart Baking Company, the maker of Wonder Bread, and became the largest commercial bakery in the United States. Twinkie snack cakes were invented in 1930 in Schiller Park, Illinois, by James Alexander Dewar, a baker at Continental Baking Company.

Continental was based in New York from 1923 to 1984. It also had its executive offices in Hoboken, New Jersey. M. Lee Marshall, descendant of John Marshall, was President, later, Chairman, from 1934-1944, and director of distribution in the War Food Administration in 1944.

Continental was purchased by ITT in 1968, then sold to Ralston Purina in 1984. It was purchased by Interstate Bakeries Corporation in 1995. The combined company was rebranded Hostess Brands in 2009.

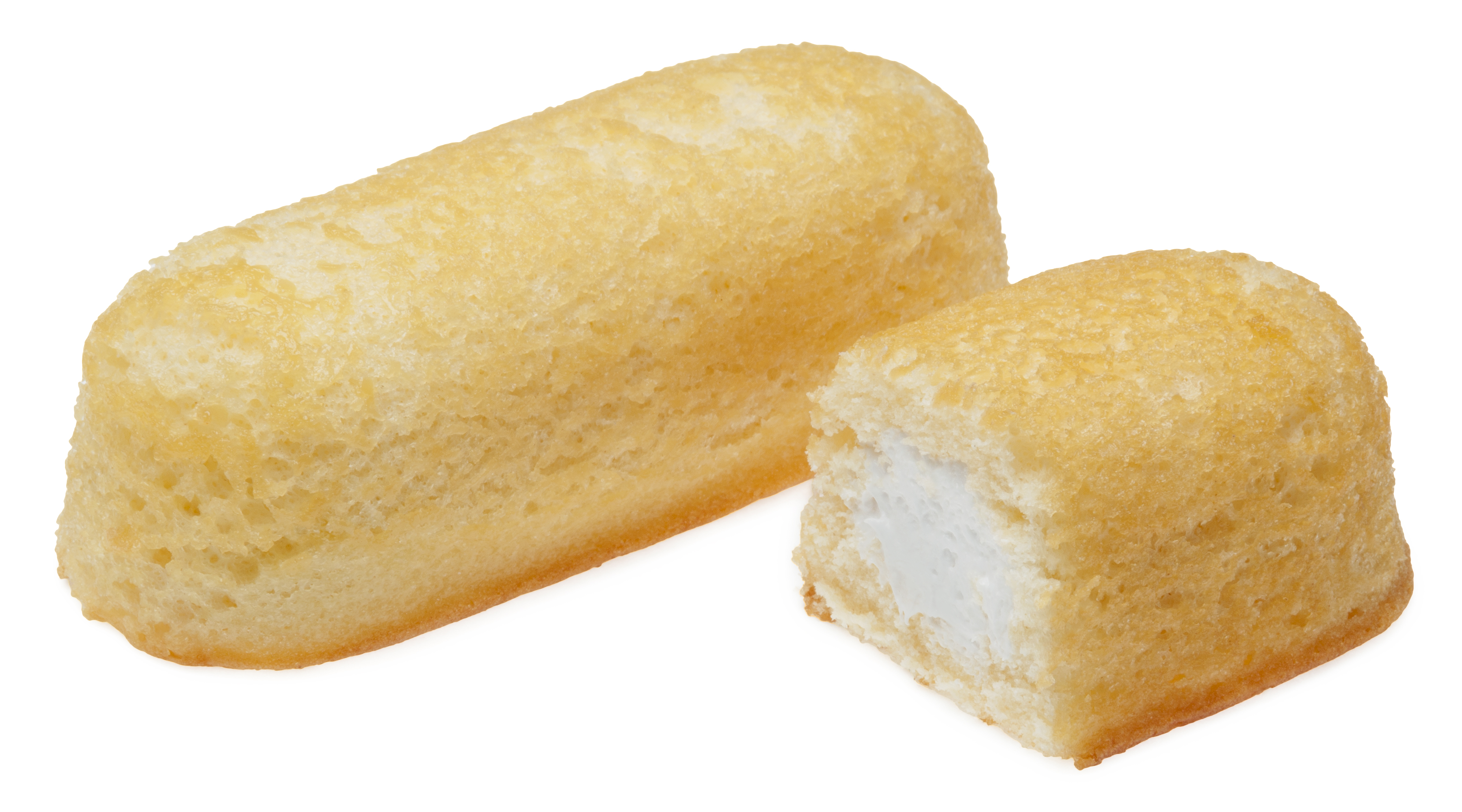
Twinkies were introduced by the Continental Baking Company in 1930.

Hostess Brands (the former Interstate Bakeries Corporation) closed in 2012. During the liquidation process, it again changed its name, to Old HB. An entirely new and separate entity, New HB Acquisition LLC, was established in 2013, 50% owned by HB Holdings, LLC, a venture set up by Apollo Global Management and C. Dean Metropoulos and Company. New HB Acquisition acquired the brand names and some plants and other assets from Old HB, then renamed itself as Hostess Brands.

== Fresh Horizons Bread ==
In 1976, ITT Continental Baking Company introduced Fresh Horizons, a line of bread marketed as a lower-calorie, high-fiber alternative to conventional bread. The product was developed amid growing public interest in dietary fiber, fueled by the research of British physician Denis Burkitt and the popularity of physician David Reuben's 1975 bestseller, The Save-Your-Life Diet. Continental advertised Fresh Horizons as containing five times the fiber of whole-wheat bread and 30 percent fewer calories than white bread.

Soon after its introduction, Fresh Horizons encountered regulatory scrutiny. In October 1976, the Food and Drug Administration (FDA) challenged labeling that suggested dietary fiber could help prevent diseases, including colon cancer and heart disease. The agency determined that these claims effectively classified the bread as an unapproved new drug under federal law, prompting the company to withdraw the disputed labeling.

The bread attracted further controversy in March 1977, during hearings on dietary fiber held by the United States Senate Select Committee on Nutrition and Human Needs, chaired by Senator George McGovern. McGovern questioned the source of the bread's added fiber, stating: "As someone who grew up in the great plains, I assumed that the fiber was the natural fiber found in wheat. Recently I have learned, however, that the fiber is actually wood pulp or sawdust."

Continental Baking disputed the characterization of its product as containing sawdust. The company explained that Fresh Horizons contained powdered cellulose, a purified substance derived from wood pulp, rather than sawdust itself. By substituting cellulose for a portion of the flour, the company was able to reduce the bread's calorie content while increasing its fiber content.

The controversy affected sales of Fresh Horizons. In June 1977, The Wall Street Journal reported that sales had declined nationwide after McGovern's remarks.

Marian Burros is often credited for breaking the Fresh Horizons powdered cellulose story.

In 1979, the Federal Trade Commission (FTC) issued a consent order concerning Continental Baking's advertising of Fresh Horizons. The order required the company to disclose the source of the bread's fiber in advertisements, using statements such as "The source of the fiber is wood" or "Contains fiber derived from pulp of trees."
