= Mar-a-Lago =

Historic resort in Palm Beach, Florida, US

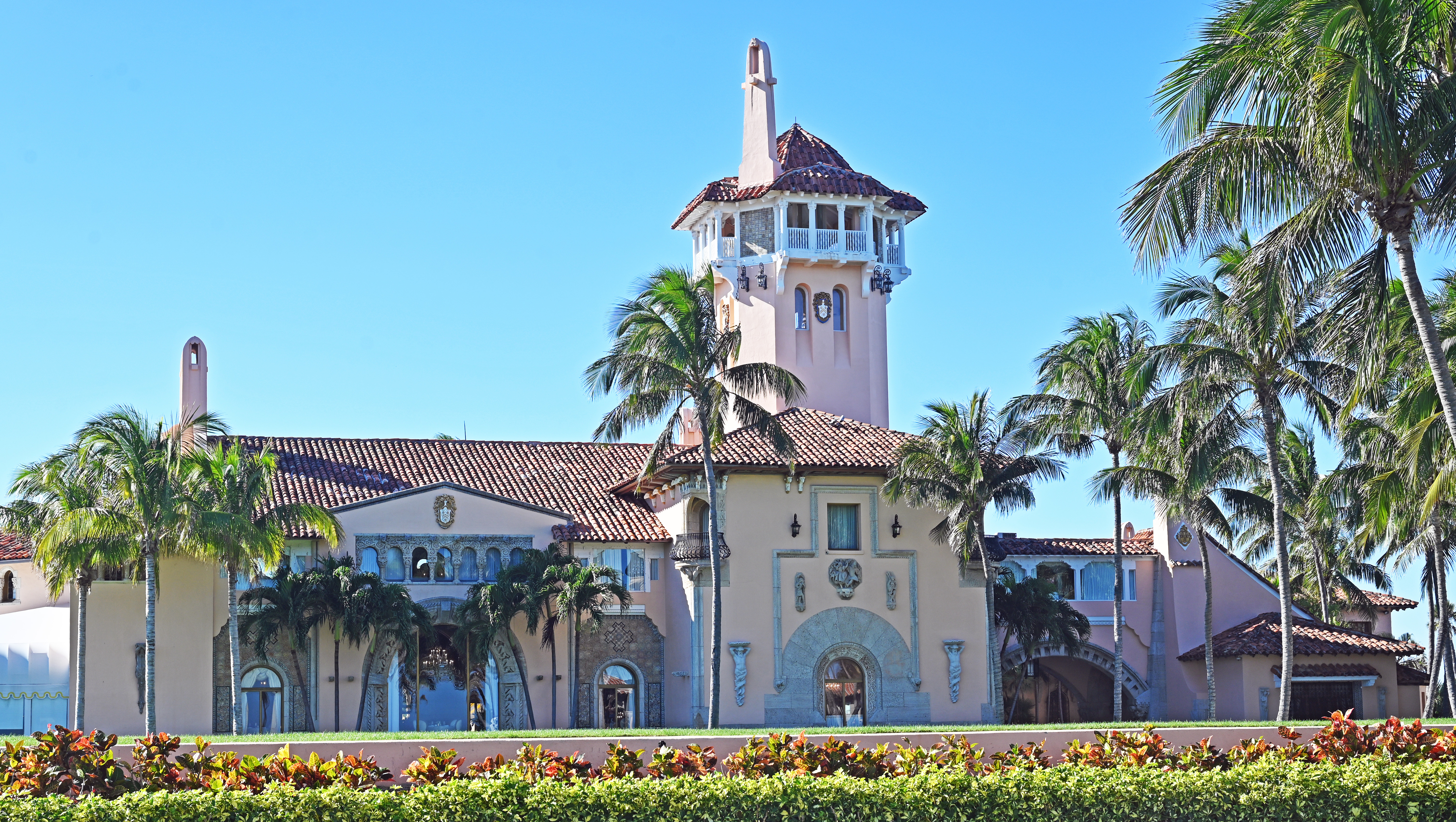
- Mar-a-Lago in 2023

General information
- Location: 1100 South Ocean Boulevard, Palm Beach, Florida, United States
- Coordinates: 26°40′37″N 80°2′13″W
- Year built: 1924–1927

Technical details
- Size: 62,500 sq ft (5,810 m^{2}) on 17 acres of land

Design and construction
- Architect: Marion Sims Wyeth (exterior) Joseph Urban (interior)

Website
- maralagoclub.com

U.S. National Historic Landmark
- Designated: December 23, 1980

U.S. National Register of Historic Places
- Designated: December 23, 1980
- Reference no.: 80000961

The Mar-a-Lago Club (/ˌmɑːr ə ˈlɑːɡoʊ/ MAR ə LAH-goh, Spanish: [ˈmaɾ a ˈlaɣo]) is a resort and National Historic Landmark on a barrier island in Palm Beach, Florida, United States. It has 126 rooms and an area of 62,500 square feet (5,810 square meters) built on 17 acres (7 hectares) of land. Since 1985, it has been owned by Donald Trump, the 45th and 47th president of the United States.

Mar-a-Lago was built for the businesswoman and socialite Marjorie Merriweather Post between 1924 and 1927, during the Florida land boom. At the time of her death in 1973, Post bequeathed the property to the National Park Service, hoping it could be used for state visits or as a Winter White House. However, because the costs of maintaining the property exceeded the funds provided by Post, and because it was difficult to secure the facility, (Note: Mar-a-Lago is located under the flight path of Palm Beach Airport.) the property was returned to the Post Foundation by act of Congress 96–586 on December 23, 1980.

In 1985, Donald Trump, primarily a businessman and real estate investor at the time, acquired Mar-a-Lago and used it as a residence. In 1995, he converted it into the Mar-a-Lago Club, a members-only club with guest rooms, a spa, and other hotel-style amenities. The Trump family maintains private quarters in a closed-off area on the grounds. During his first presidency, Trump frequently visited Mar-a-Lago and held meetings there with international leaders, including Japanese prime minister Shinzo Abe and Chinese president Xi Jinping.

== Etymology ==
The name Mar-a-Lago means "sea to lake" in Spanish, reflecting the fact that the estate extends from one side of Palm Beach Island to the other, touching the Atlantic Ocean on the east and the Lake Worth Lagoon on the west.

== History ==
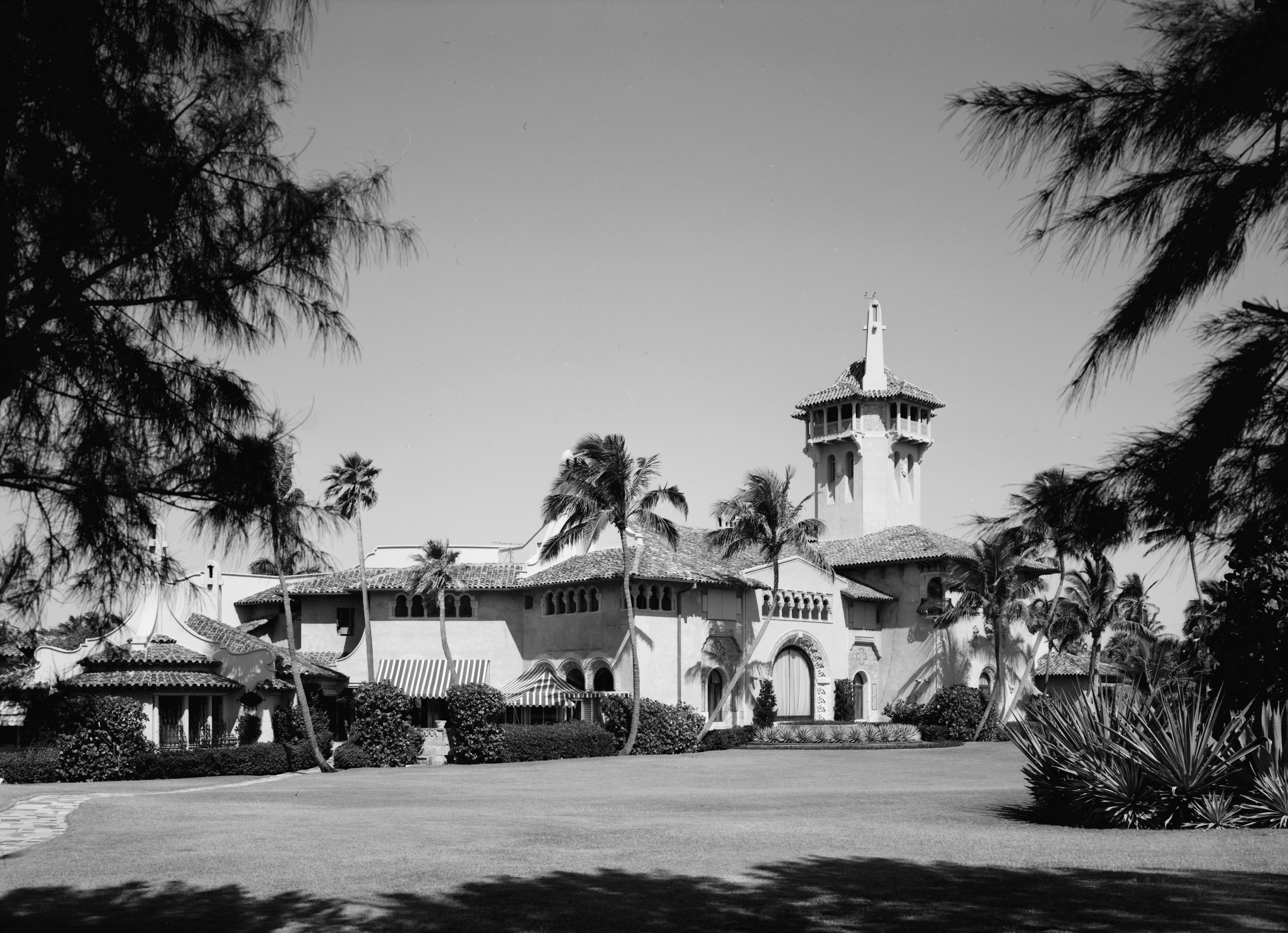
Exterior of Mar-a-Lago, 1967

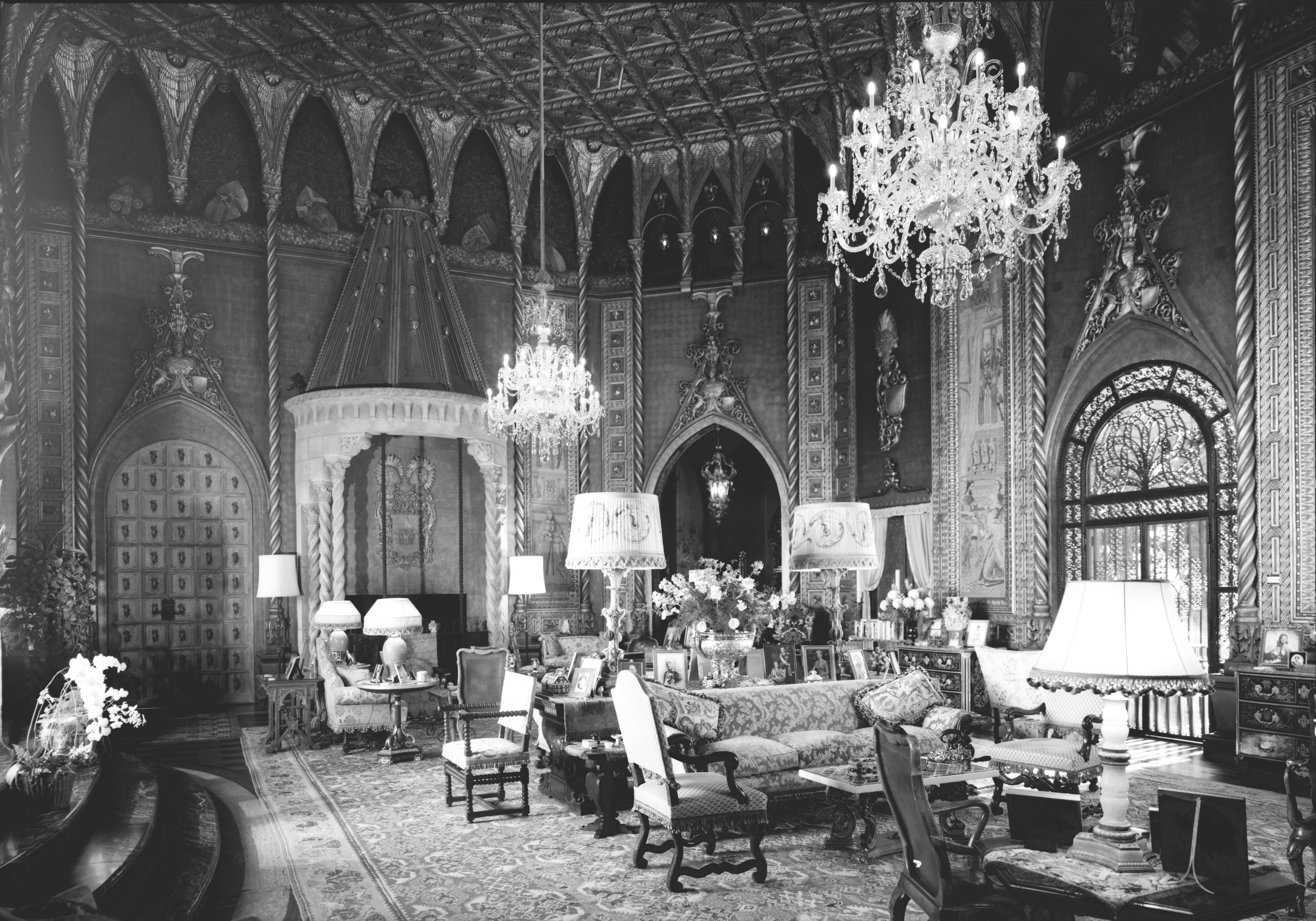
Living room of Mar-a-Lago, 1967

=== Design ===
During the 1920s Florida land boom, Marjorie Merriweather Post, heiress to the Post Cereals business and later the wealthiest woman in the United States, paid for the house to be built with her husband Edward F. Hutton. She hired Marion Sims Wyeth as designer and Joseph Urban for interior design and exterior decorations. Post spent US$7 million (equivalent to $130 million in 2025). It was finished in 1927.

=== Winter residence of Marjorie Merriweather Post ===
Hutton and Post regularly used Mar-a-Lago as their winter residence, typically staying from mid January to late March. Post hosted dinner parties, charity events, concerts, costume balls, and a circus.

In 1935, Hutton and Post divorced. Post married the Washington lawyer Joseph E. Davies, who was appointed ambassador to the Soviet Union. Mar-a-Lago was closed for five seasons. Post made only brief visits to Mar-a-Lago in the early 1940s and did not stay at the estate from 1941 to 1948. In April 1944 the house was turned into a training center for returning servicemen.

Post returned to Mar-a-Lago in 1948 and began to host social events again. Since 1957 it has traditionally hosted the International Red Cross gala. In 1961 a pavilion with a 30-by-50-foot (9 by 15 m) dance floor was built where square dance evenings were held.

=== Federal government and foundation ===
By the 1950s and 1960s, social tastes had changed, and many mansions constructed in the 1920s were demolished. However, in 1969 Mar-a-Lago was designated a national historic site. A contemporary report prepared by the Department of the Interior attributed its significance to providing "an excellent picture of winter resort life in Palm Beach prior to the Depression".

Post, who died in 1973, willed the 17-acre (6.9 ha) estate to the United States government as a Winter White House for presidents and visiting foreign dignitaries. Richard Nixon preferred the Florida White House in Key Biscayne, however, and Jimmy Carter was not interested. The federal government soon realized the immense cost of maintenance and the difficulty of providing security and returned it to the Post Foundation in 1981. It was listed for sale for $20 million. Post's daughters, including Dina Merrill, did not maintain the property anticipating a sale, but there was so little interest that its demolition was approved.

Mar-a-Lago was declared a National Historic Landmark in 1980 for exemplifying "the baronial way of life of the wealthy who built mansions in Florida during the Florida land boom of the 1920s".

=== Trump ownership ===
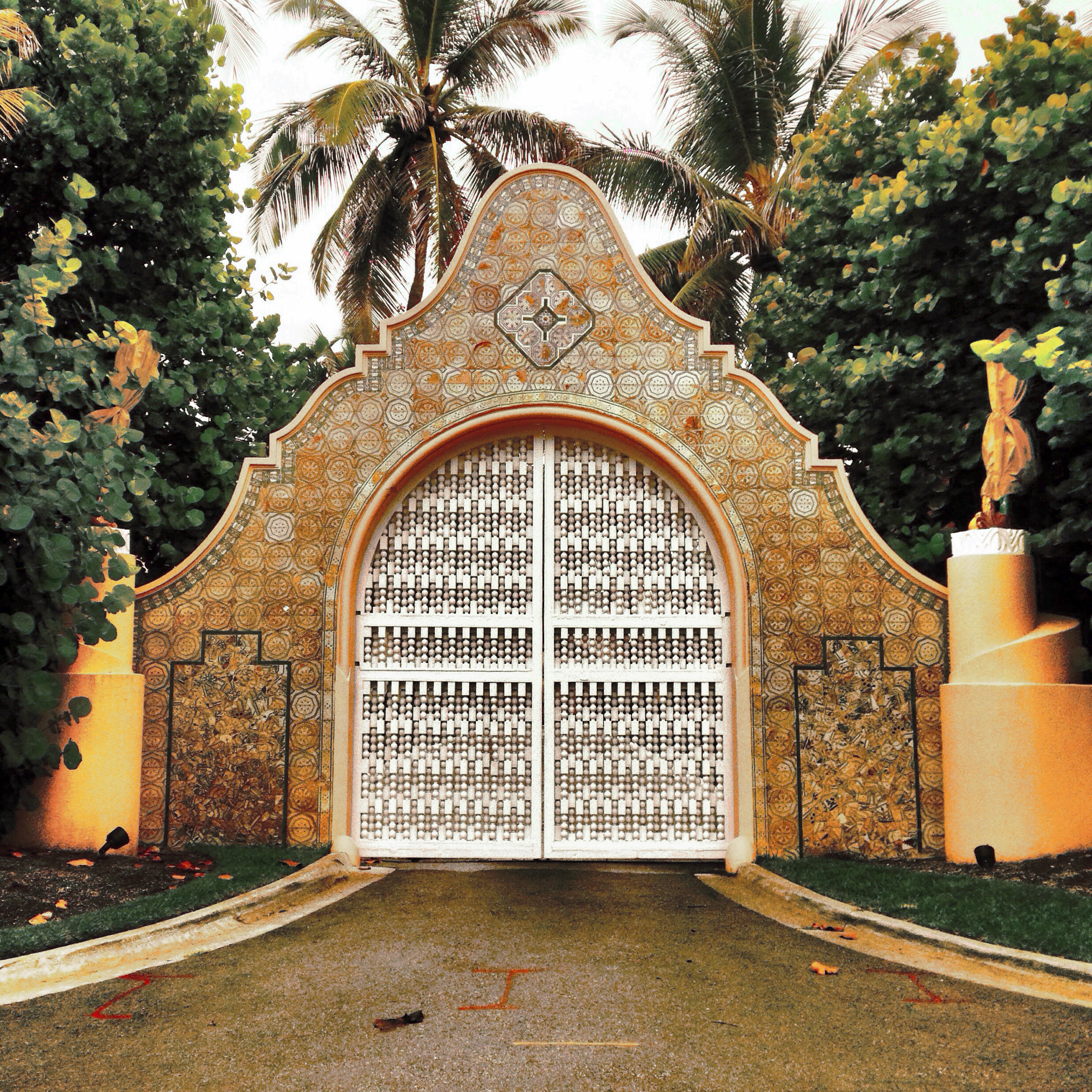
Entrance gate in 2014

Donald Trump initially offered the Post family $15 million, which was rejected. Trump then purchased land between Mar-a-Lago and the ocean from Jack C. Massey, the former owner of KFC, for $2 million, stating he intended to build a home that would block Mar-a-Lago's beach view. This threat caused competing interest in Mar-a-Lago to decline. Trump purchased the property for $7 million in 1985. Different sources have put the combined total cost of the purchase at around $10 million. The minimum acceptable bid had been $20 million, and the interior furnishings were appraised at $8 million.

Mar-a-Lago, which was renovated by Trump, remained largely true to its original style. Extensive renovations were done, including the addition of a 20,000-square-foot (1,900 m^{2}) ballroom. The club has five clay tennis courts and a waterfront pool. Trump's wife at the time, Ivana Trump, managed the property.

In 1992, Trump was filmed with Jeffrey Epstein at a party in Mar-a-Lago. The footage received attention following Epstein's arrest for child sex trafficking in 2019, and video footage of Trump talking to Epstein in Mar-a-Lago appears in the 2020 mockumentary black comedy film Borat Subsequent Moviefilm. It was also alleged that Mar-a-Lago hosted an event for 28 women in 1992 where Trump and Epstein were the only male attendees. Further photographs of the pair taken at Mar-a-Lago include a photograph of Trump and Epstein from 1997, and a photograph taken on February 12, 2000, with Trump, Epstein, Ghislaine Maxwell, and Trump's future wife Melania.

In the early 1990s, Trump faced financial difficulties. While negotiating with bankers he attempted to divide Mar-a-Lago into smaller properties, alarming Palm Beach residents. Town council rejected this plan. Trump instead turned the estate into a private club in 1995, fighting what he considered to be excessive restrictions.

The new club hosted concerts by celebrities such as Celine Dion and Billy Joel, and had beauty pageant contestants as guests. Mar-a-lago also had numerous celebrity guests; notably, Michael Jackson and Lisa Marie Presley had their honeymoon there in 1994, and according to his biography Michael Jackson: The Magic and the Madness Jackson and Presley kissed for the first time at Mar-a-Lago early in their relationship. It still frequently hosted the International Red Cross Ball, an annual "white tie, tails, and tiara" event founded by Post.

In 2000, Virginia Giuffre was a spa attendant at Mar-a-Lago when she was first approached by Ghislaine Maxwell and introduced to Jeffrey Epstein. Giuffre would later go on to make accusations against Maxwell and Epstein for sex trafficking her to clients including Prince Andrew and Alan Dershowitz.

In 2005, Trump married Melania Knauss at Mar-a-Lago. The ceremony was attended by Bill and Hillary Clinton, as well as many other celebrities and figures in media and broadcasting.

According to financial disclosure forms filed by Trump, the Mar-a-Lago Club had $29.7 million in gross revenues in the period of June 2015 through May 2016. The club had revenues of $25.1 million for calendar year 2017, $22 million in 2018, and $21.4 million in 2019.

In 2022, Forbes estimated the value of the estate at around $350 million. In 1995 Trump "gave up the right to use Mar-a-Lago for any purpose other than as a social club" by agreeing to a "Deed of Conservation and Preservation". In 2002, he agreed to a conservation easement preventing further development. According to Forbes, "Real estate experts outside of Palm Beach guessed that the place was worth more than $200 million. Brokers on the island thought it could be worth far more, with the most aggressive estimate coming in at $725 million. When Forbes last valued the property in March, we went with a conservative $350 million." A 2022 lawsuit filed by New York Attorney General Letitia James alleged that Trump inflated the value of Mar-a-Lago to $739 million, when the property should actually be valued at $75 million.

=== First Trump presidency ===
President Trump referred to Mar-a-Lago as his "Winter White House", and on occasion his "Southern White House".

During Trump's first presidency, a Sensitive Compartmented Information Facility (SCIF) was operational at Mar-a-Lago, and reestablished for his second term. The SCIF was used for communications with the White House Situation Room and Pentagon. The Mar-a-Lago Crowd, an informal group organized by President Trump which oversaw many of the activities of the Department of Veterans Affairs during the Trump administration, frequently met at the club.

==== Notable presidential visits ====
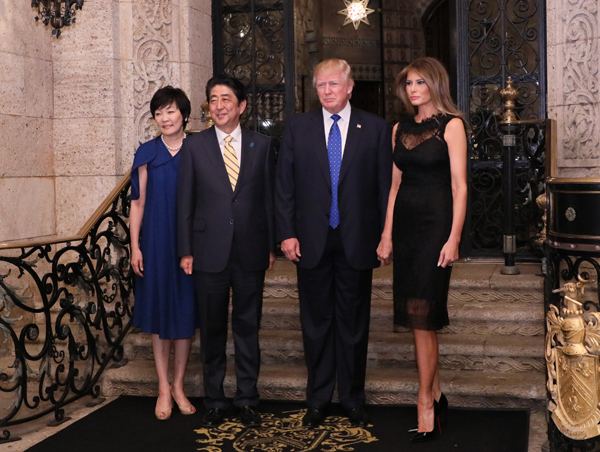
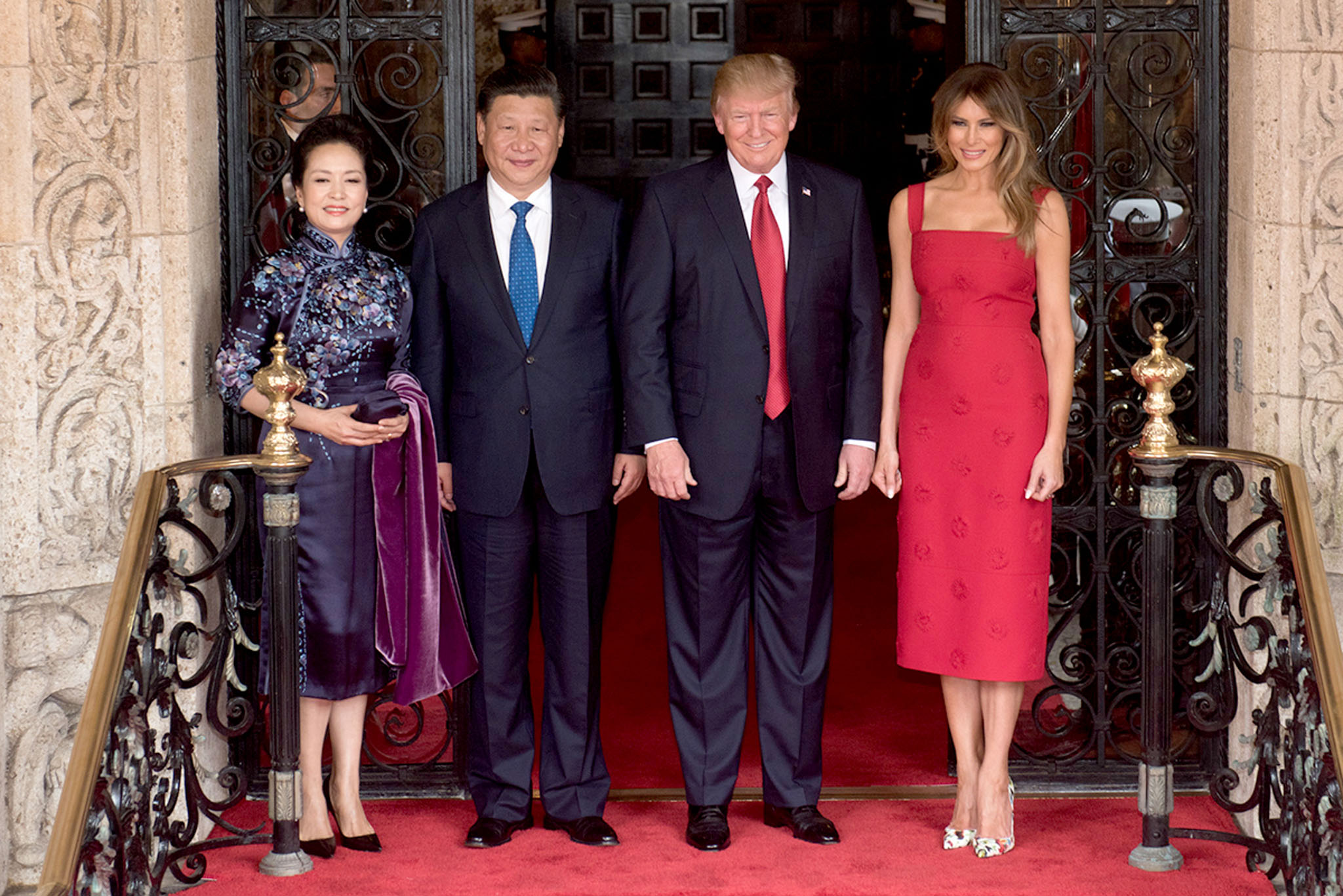
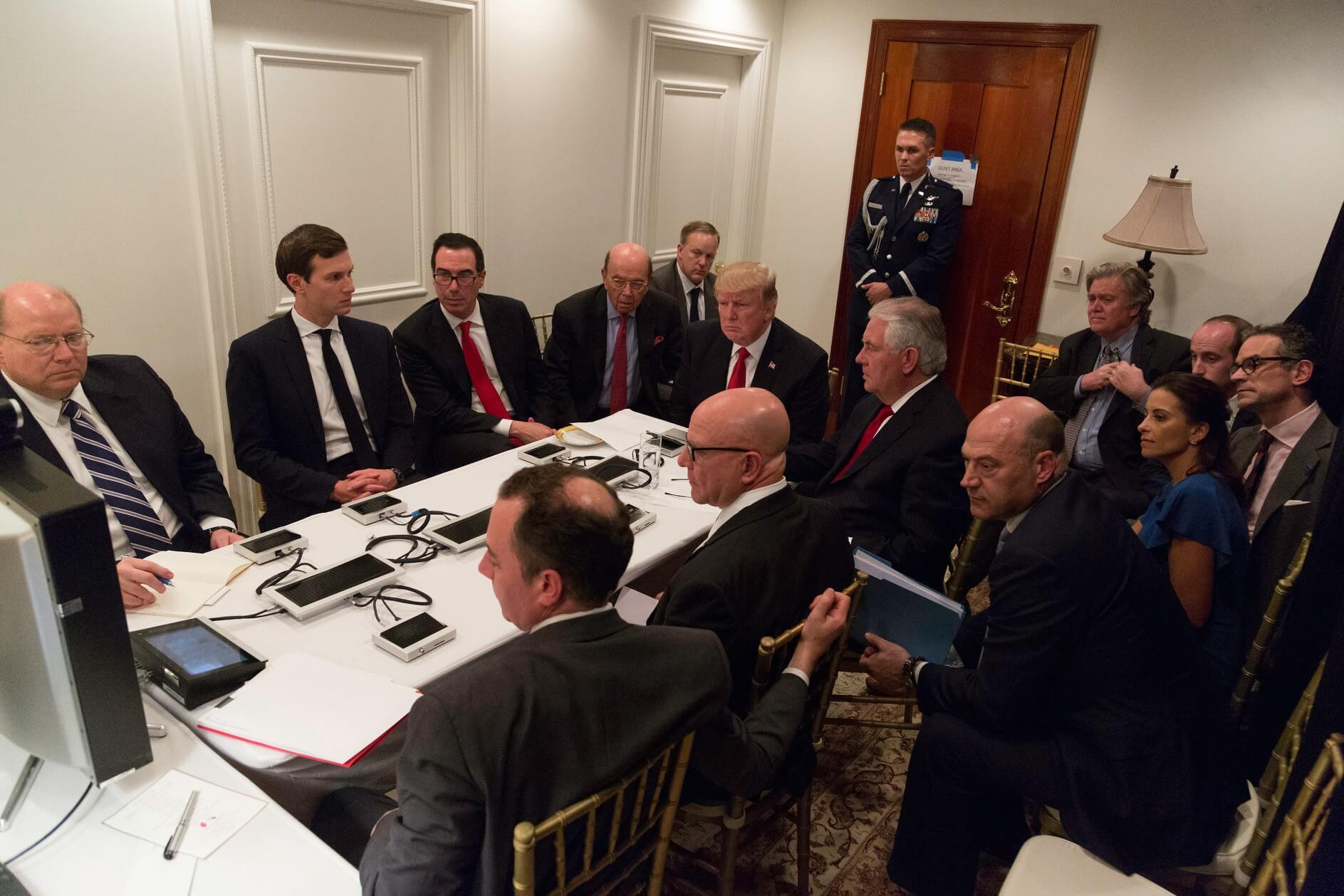
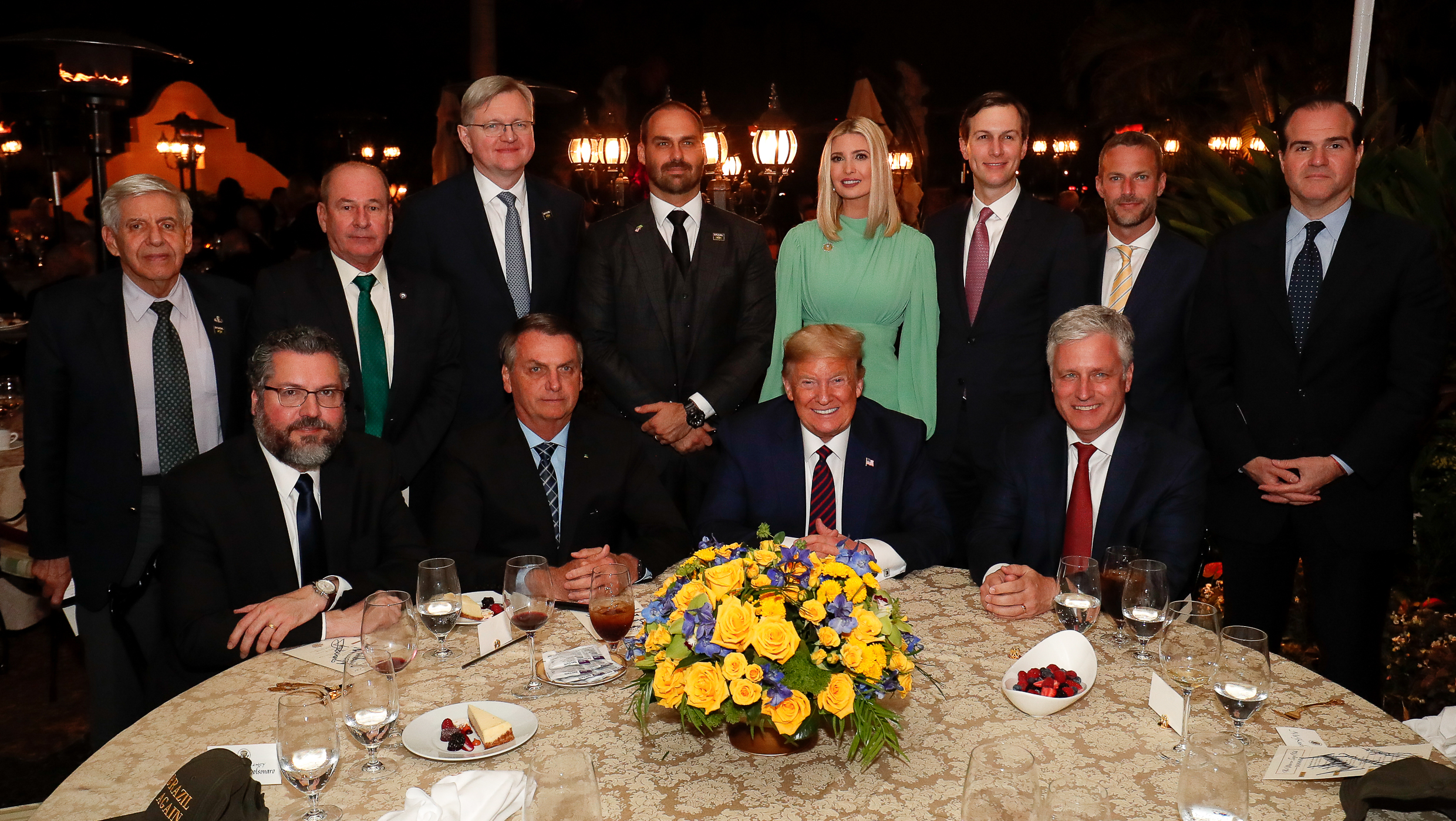
At Mar-a-Lago, clockwise from top-left:
- The Trumps host Shinzō Abe and his wife Akie Abe
- The Trumps host Xi Jinping and his wife Peng Liyuan
- President Trump hosts Brazilian president Jair Bolsonaro
- President Trump (at the head of the table) and staffers monitor the missile strike on Syria from the SCIF

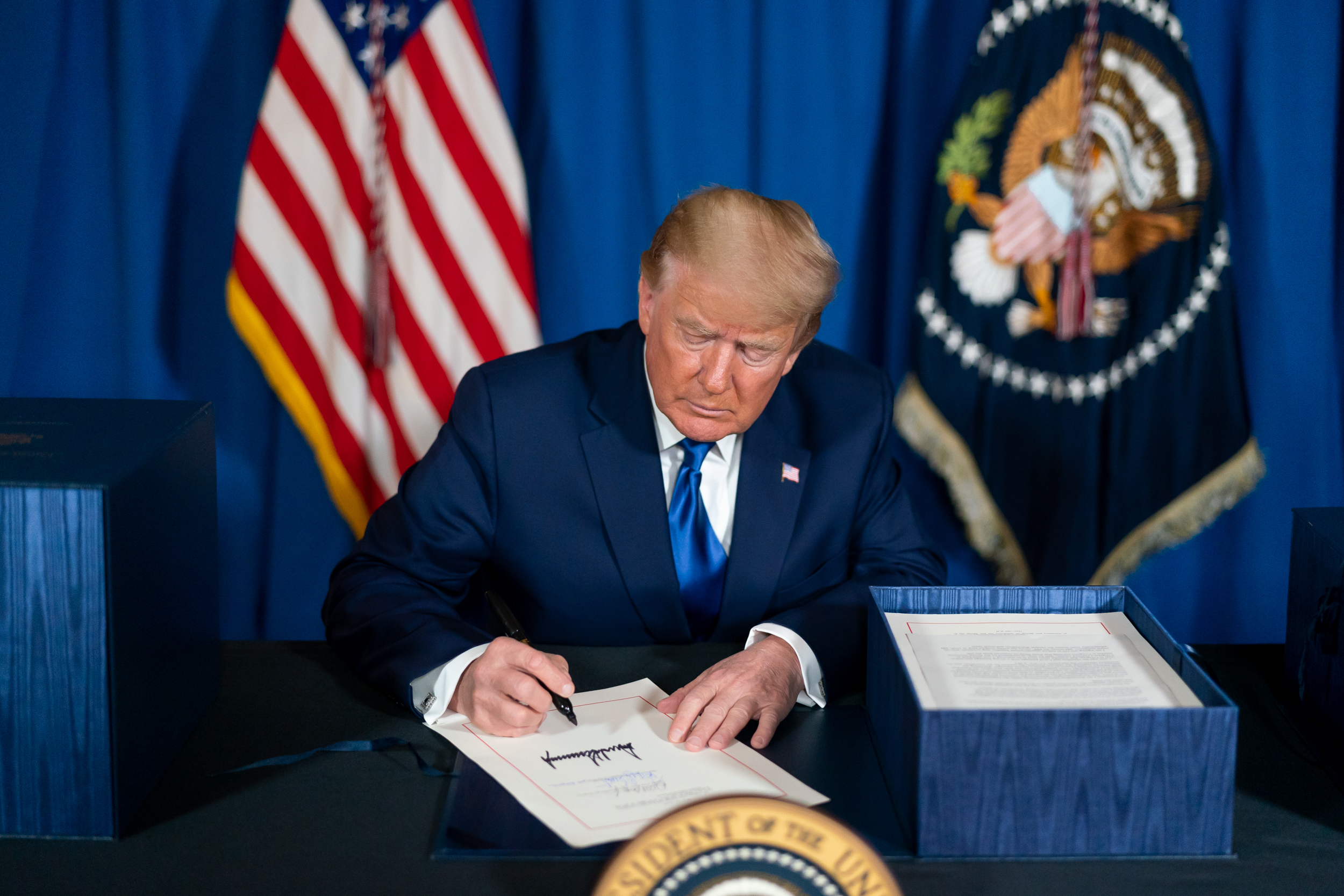
Trump signing the Consolidated Appropriations Act, 2021 at Mar-a-Lago on December 27, 2020

Donald Trump's first visit to Mar-a-Lago as president of the United States took place on the weekend of February 3–6, 2017. On Saturday, he hosted the Diamond Red Cross Ball at the Mar-a-Lago Club, and on Sunday he watched Super Bowl LI at the nearby Trump International Golf Club in West Palm Beach.

On the weekend of February 10–12, 2017, President Trump and his wife Melania hosted Japanese prime minister Shinzō Abe and his wife. This was the first use of Mar-a-Lago to entertain an international leader, traditionally performed at the White House. On this weekend one of President Trump's first international security crises happened, a North Korean missile launch. Trump and Abe conferred in full view of the other diners.

During the third weekend visit to Mar-a-Lago on February 17–20, President Trump conducted a campaign rally at the Melbourne Orlando International Airport. He also conducted interviews for a replacement National Security Advisor and named General H. R. McMaster as Michael Flynn's, who had recently been terminated, successor on February 20, 2017.

After President Trump's fourth weekend visit on March 3–5, 2017, questions were raised about the access his paying club members have to him and his entourage. A number of Democratic senators asked the President to release visitor logs of Mar-a-Lago and as well as a list of the members of the private club. Subsequently, the "Mar-a-Lago Act" was introduced, legislation requiring publication of logs of visitors at the White House and other places where the president conducts business. After a lawsuit was filed, a judge ordered, in July 2017, that these logs be released in September.

President Trump's fifth presidential visit took place on March 17–18. Guests included Melania's parents, Viktor and Amalija Knavs.

During his next visit April 6–9, President Trump hosted the Chinese president Xi Jinping for the first two days. At Mar-a-Lago, the decision to strike a Syrian airfield was made. The following Easter weekend was also spent with family members at Mar-a-Lago.

On April 4, 2017, prior to Xi's visit, ShareAmerica, a website run by the U.S. Department of State's Bureau of International Information Programs, published a blog post describing Mar-a-Lago's history. On April 5, 2017, the U.S. embassy in the United Kingdom's website shared snippets of the original blog post on its own blog, and the U.S. embassy in Albania's Facebook page shared the original post. On April 24, 2017, Democratic senator Ron Wyden, House minority leader Nancy Pelosi, and ethics observers like former ambassador Norman Eisen, questioned the use of official government resources promoting a private property owned by Trump. By April 25, 2017, ShareAmerica and both U.S. embassies in the United Kingdom and Albania removed their respective posts. ShareAmerica, replaced their post with the following statement, "The intention of the article was to inform the public about where the president has been hosting world leaders. We regret any misperception and have removed the post."

In November 2017, President Trump returned to Mar-a-Lago for a Thanksgiving celebration, and one month later he returned for his tenth presidential visit during his Christmas vacation.

In 2018, President Trump visited Mar-a-Lago eight times prior to the seasonal closing in May. During this time he had a summit meeting with Shinzō Abe on April 17–18.

In November 2018, President Trump returned to Mar-a-Lago for Thanksgiving. One month later, President Trump canceled his planned Christmas vacation in Mar-a-Lago following the federal government shutdown. In November 2019, he returned to Mar-a-Lago for Thanksgiving, and a month later returned for Christmas.

On March 7, 2020, President Trump hosted Brazilian president Jair Bolsonaro for a working dinner, where the two leaders discussed the U.S.-led effort to oust Venezuelan president Nicolás Maduro, a future trade deal, and peace for the Middle East. Also at the dinner was Bolsonaro's press secretary, Fábio Wajngarten, whose wife informed others on social media on March 11, 2020, that he had tested positive for COVID-19 after he had returned from the United States via Miami to Brazil. Others attending the dinner included Vice President Mike Pence, Ivanka Trump, and Jared Kushner.

==== Security zone ====
When President Trump was in residence as president, the Palm Beach region became a zone of temporary flight restrictions affecting flights and air operations severely within a 30 nautical mile (55.56 km) radius. Coast Guard and Secret Service secured the two waterway approaches, ocean and lake, and Secret Service cordoned off streets to Mar-a-Lago during the president's visits. The Coast Guard also attached an elite Maritime Safety and Security Team with unique capabilities that specialized in maritime security. By the third weekend in February 2017, nearby Palm Beach County Park Airport (Lantana Airport) had been shut down for three consecutive weekends, accumulating significant financial losses for multiple businesses.

=== Between Trump presidencies ===
At the end of his term, Trump went to live at Mar-a-Lago and established an office as provided for by the Former Presidents Act. Following the end of his term, Trump and other Republican candidates continued to hold fundraisers at Mar-a-Lago, and Trump continued to hold significant influence over the Republican party, a state of affairs labelled the "Mar-a-Lago machine" by The New York Times.

Mar-a-Lago was the location of watch parties for Trump and close allies for the 2022 United States elections on November 8, 2022, and for Super Tuesday on March 5, 2024. During his 2024 presidential campaign, Trump hosted Benjamin Netanyahu at Mar-a-Lago.

==== Storage of classified records ====
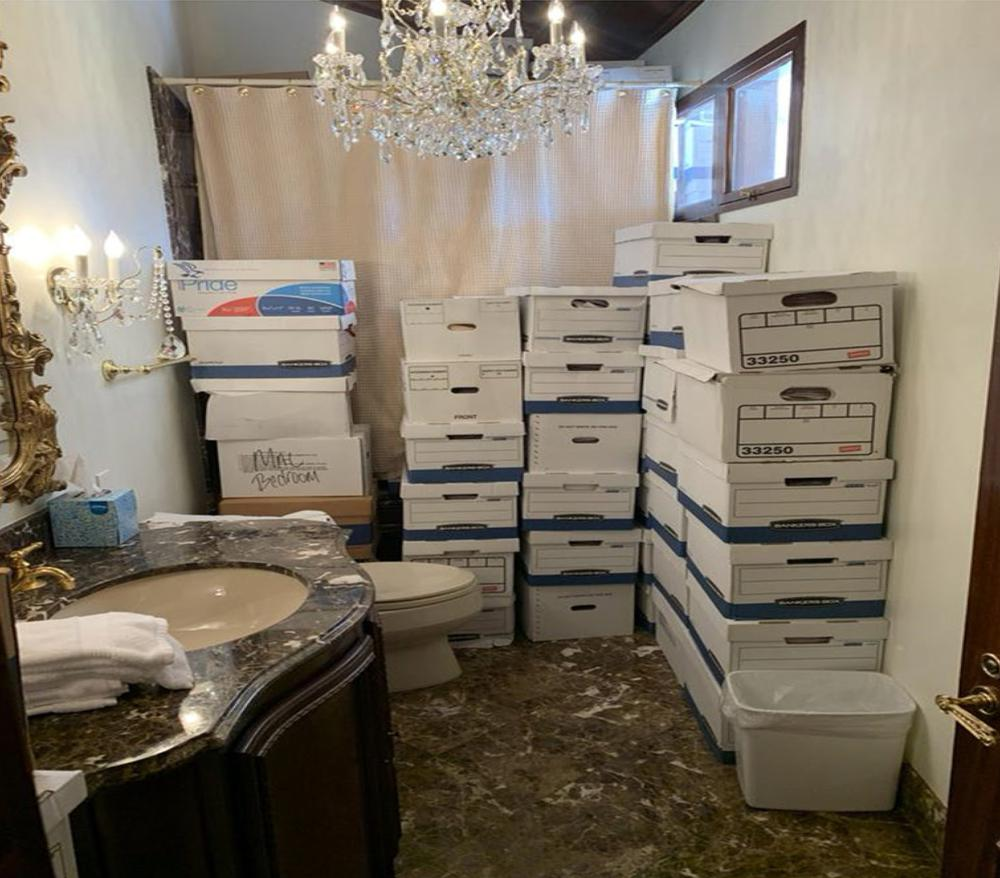
Classified documents stored in a bathroom at Mar-a-Lago

Upon departing the White House in January 2021, Trump transported a large volume of presidential records to Mar-a-Lago, despite storage of such materials being subject to the Presidential Records Act. Seeking to preserve presidential communications and correspondence with world leaders, the National Archives and Records Administration arranged to retrieve 15 boxes of material from Mar-a-Lago in January 2022. These included documents clearly marked as classified, prompting the Department of Justice to restrict any details regarding the contents of the 15 boxes.

On May 11, 2022, the Justice Department sent Trump a grand jury subpoena, requesting any additional documents marked classified. A later subpoena requested surveillance footage from the club. On August 8, 2022, FBI agents presented a search warrant and searched Trump's residence at Mar-a-Lago, part of the continuing investigation into the potential mishandling of classified documents. The Secret Service "facilitated access" for the FBI, and one of Trump's lawyers was present for the search.

=== Second Trump presidency ===
Trump was at Mar-a-Lago on the night of the 2024 United States presidential election. While Trump's official watch party was hosted at Palm Beach County Convention Center, where Trump delivered his victory speech, Trump hosted a more exclusive watch party and several private dinners at Mar-a-Lago during election night. Attendees at the event included his extended family, close friends and members of the Mar-a-Lago club. Elon Musk, Robert F. Kennedy Jr., Dana White and Vivek Ramaswamy were all at the Mar-a-Lago events, as well as foreign political figures such as Nigel Farage and Eduardo Bolsonaro. Following his election to a second term as President of the United States, Mar-a-Lago became the base for the second presidential transition of Donald Trump as the president-elect made decisions on the nomination of people for his upcoming administration.

In February 2026, an armed man was fatally shot after breaching the security perimeter. President Trump was not at Mar-a-Lago at the time.

== Architectural style, layout, and materials ==
Architecturally, the resort is in Spanish Revival style. The house is a Mediterranean-style villa, an adaptation of Hispano-Moresque architecture which was popular in Palm Beach at the time. It has a two-story central block with family quarters and service areas in lower subsidiary wings and buildings. This arrangement was chosen by Mrs. Post to keep the main house from appearing too massive and to separate the family and service areas from those used for entertaining. The house is topped by a seventy-five foot, tile-roofed tower containing bedrooms, baths, and an observation deck with an extensive view of Palm Beach.

Among the imported materials used were three boatloads of Doria limestone from Genoa visible in the exterior wall facing, some interior structures, arches, and the Barwig sculptures. This fossil-bearing limestone was chosen for its quality of rapid aging and its suitability for intricate carving. Approximately 20,000 roofing tiles and 2,200 black and white marble floor blocks came from a Cuban castle. Spanish tiles are used in the entrance hall, patio, cloisters, and some rooms from a collection of nearly 36,000 tiles that had been collected by Henry O. and Louisine Havemeyer as originally from a Charles V villa in Guadix, but actually 20th-century imitations.

The house has 58 bedrooms, 33 bathrooms, a 29-foot-long (8.8 m) pietra dura marble-top dining table, 12 fireplaces, and three bomb shelters.

On April 18, 2012, members of the American Institute of Architects' Florida chapter ranked Mar-a-Lago fifth on the Florida Architecture: 100 Years. 100 Places list.

== The Mar-a-Lago Club ==
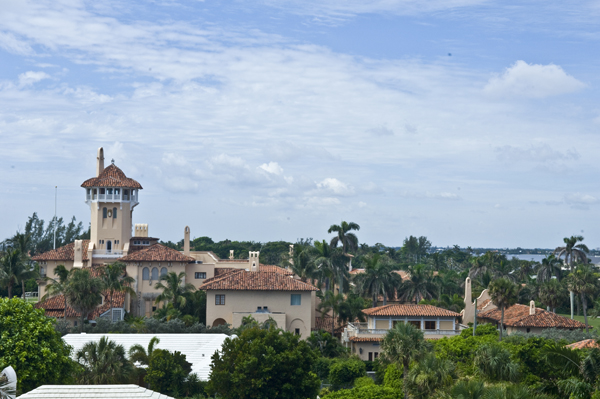
Mar-a-Lago in 2009

The primary business occupying the estate is the Mar-a-Lago Club, which opened in 1995 and operates as resort and hotel for dues-paying members, and rents out estate venues for private events. Operating the mansion as a club in this way, while continuing to live on the premises, allows Trump to significantly reduce his tax bill, by identifying a range of items used to maintain the mansion and his lifestyle as being legitimate business expenses.

Membership at the Mar-a-Lago Club required a $200,000 initiation fee. In 2012, reportedly in response to reduced demand following the Bernie Madoff scandal which affected many affluent Palm Beach residents, the fee was lowered to $100,000. The fee returned to $200,000 in January 2017 after Trump was elected president, with $14,000 annual dues. Overnight guests paid up to $2,000 a night. In 2024, the initiation fee was raised from $700,000 to $1 million, with annual dues of $20,000.

The membership list of Mar-a-Lago has long been shrouded in secrecy. The 2020 book The Grifter's Club had access to old membership records from the club, which confirmed that Jeffrey Epstein had been a member until 2007, and reveals that he was expelled "after Epstein harassed the daughter of a member", according to another Mar-a-Lago member. The book alleges that the girl was a teenager at the time, and confirms that Epstein is listed in club membership records as "Account closed 10/07", in contrast to cases of members' resignations, where "Resigned" is normally noted.

As of January 2017, the club was nearly at its maximum capacity of 500 paying members and was admitting twenty to forty new members a year. Members as of 2017 include oil executive Bill Koch, financier Thomas Peterffy, New Jersey Democratic Party leader George Norcross, lobbyist Kenneth Duberstein, real estate developers Bruce E. Toll and Richard LeFrak, media executive Christopher Ruddy, talk show host Howie Carr, talk show host Michael Savage's wife, and NFL coach Bill Belichick.

In February 2017 it was reported that Trump was considering at least three club members for ambassadorships.

In protest against Trump's remarks on the August 2017 Unite the Right rally in Charlottesville, Virginia, six nonprofit organizations canceled scheduled gala events at the club. The charities canceling included the American Red Cross and the American Cancer Society.

The club has been frequently cited for health code violations. In January 2017, Florida inspectors noted 15 infractions that included unsafe seafood, insufficiently refrigerated meats, rusty shelving, and cooks without hairnets. However, according to Florida department of Business and Professional Regulation spokesman, Stephen Lawson, "The infractions were corrected on site, and the establishment was immediately brought into compliance." Since 2013, it has faced 51 health code violations.

On March 30, 2019, Yujing Zhang, a Chinese national, was arrested and charged with unlawful entry to the premises and making false statements to federal law enforcement officials. Chinese nationals were also arrested for trespassing at Mar-a-Lago in December 2019. Chinese national Zijie Li attempted to enter the property at least three times in 2024.

In August 2022, the Pittsburgh Post-Gazette reported that a Ukrainian-born Russian speaker who used a fake name and claimed to be a Rothschild family heiress had frequented the residence over a year's time, even posing there for photos with Trump and Senator Lindsey Graham.

== Legal issues ==
=== Hurricane insurance claim ===
Trump received a $17 million insurance payment for hurricane damage to Mar-a-Lago after the 2005 Atlantic hurricane season, for damage to the "landscaping, roofing, walls, painting, leaks, artwork in the tapestries, tiles, Spanish tiles, the beach, the erosion", as he described. Anthony Senecal, a former mayor and Trump's former butler at the resort and later its "in-house historian" said some trees behind the resort had been flattened and some roof tiles were lost, but "That house has never been seriously damaged. I was there for all [the hurricanes]."

=== American flag litigation ===
On October 3, 2006, Trump raised a 20-by-30-foot (6.1 by 9.1 m) American flag on an 80-foot (24 m) flagpole at Mar-a-Lago. Town zoning officials asked Trump to adhere to town zoning codes that limit flagpoles to a height of 42 feet (13 m). This dispute led the town council of Palm Beach to charge Trump $1,250 for every day the flag stayed up. Trump filed a lawsuit against the Town of Palm Beach. He eventually dropped his lawsuit over the flag, and in exchange the town waived its fines. As part of a court-ordered mediation, Trump was allowed to file for a permit and keep a pole that was both 10 feet (3.0 m) shorter than the original pole and located on a different spot on his lawn. The agreement also required him to donate $100,000 to veterans' charities, and resulted in a change to town ordinances allowing out-of-town club members.

=== Discrimination lawsuit ===
In 1993, Trump and the city of Palm Beach signed an agreement that allowed Trump to turn the residence into a private club. In November 1996, Trump asked the Palm Beach council to lift the restrictions contained in the agreement that limited media photography, filmmaking, land sales, membership, and traffic at the club, and prevented him from applying for tax exemptions on the property for three years. The council denied the request. According to Vanity Fair, before the meeting "Trump and his attorney had already implied that he and his club had been discriminated against because many of its members were Jewish, and, worse, that the council members who had placed the conditions on him had not placed those restrictions on their own clubs." In December 1997, Trump filed a lawsuit in the United States District Court for the Southern District of Florida alleging that the town discriminated against him and his club because the club accepted Jewish and African-American members and because town officials had financial stakes in competing clubs.

=== Aviation litigation ===
Trump has repeatedly filed lawsuits against Palm Beach County over aircraft going to and from Palm Beach International Airport (PBI) allegedly affecting Mar-a-Lago.

Trump first filed such a lawsuit in 1995; that action was settled in 1996, with the county agreeing to collaborate with the Federal Aviation Administration (FAA) and to change flight patterns so the noisiest jet aircraft flew over a wider area. As part of the settlement, Trump leased 215 acres (87 hectares) from the county, on which he built the 18-hole Trump International Golf Club. In July 2010, Trump filed another lawsuit aiming to stop the airport from constructing a second commercial runway. That suit was dismissed.

Trump filed a third suit against the county in January 2015, seeking $100 million in damages for "creating an unreasonable amount of noise, emissions and pollutants at Mar-a-Lago". Trump claims that officials pressured the FAA to direct air traffic to PBI over Mar-a-Lago in a "deliberate and malicious" act.

In November 2015, a Florida Circuit Court judge ruled against most of Trump's arguments, dismissing four of the six claims and allowing the others to proceed. Trump dropped the lawsuit after winning the presidency, as the estate would likely have a no-fly zone imposed by the FAA. In January 2017, Palm Beach exempted Mar-a-Lago from a ban on landing helicopters on residential properties while Trump was president, including his own fleet and Marine One.

=== Use as a Trump residence ===
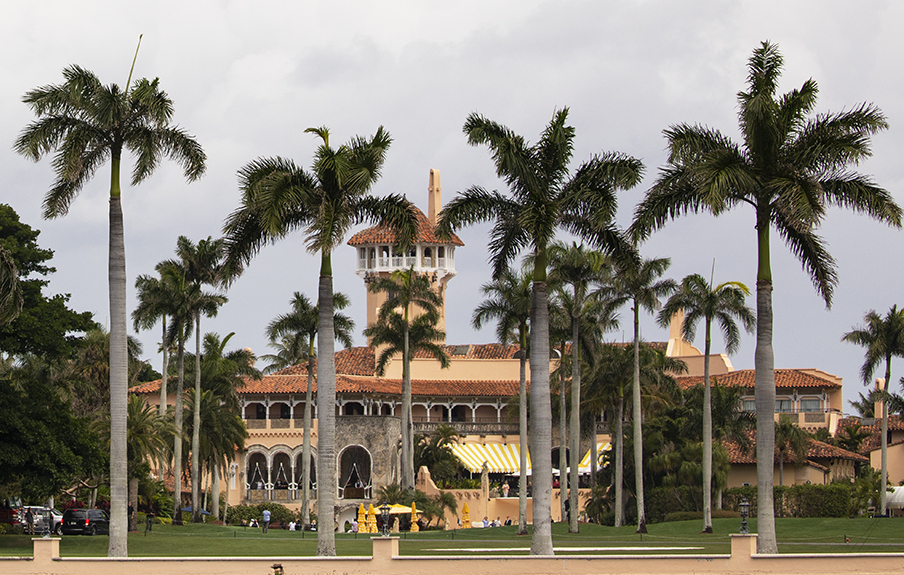
Trump's estate on Palm Beach Island in 2019

In September 2019, Mar-a-Lago became the primary residence for Donald and Melania Trump, who previously held primary residence in New York City. The legality of this was disputed because, in 1993, Trump signed a "use agreement" with the town of Palm Beach, Florida, that changed Mar-a-Lago's designation from a single-family residence to a private club and specified that guests, including Trump, could not stay there more than three non-consecutive weeks per year.

In December 2020, neighbors of Mar-a-Lago delivered a demand letter to the town of Palm Beach, stating that the town should notify Trump that he cannot use the estate as his residence. In 2021, Palm Beach's attorney concluded that Palm Beach's zoning code allowed employees to reside at private clubs. He also stated that paperwork submitted by Trump's attorney confirmed that Trump was an employee whose duties include "overseeing the property, evaluating the performance of employees, suggesting improvements to the club's operations, reviewing the club's financials, attending events, greeting guests and recommending candidates for membership".

=== Appraisal discrepancy ===
Palm Beach county assessors appraise the value of the property "based on Mar-a-Lago's annual net operating income as a club, not on its resale value as a home or on its reconstruction cost". As part of the New York civil investigation of the Trump Organization, a New York court found that from 2011 to 2021 Mar-a-Lago was assessed by Palm Beach County as having a value from $18 million to $27.6 million, while at the same time Trump's financial statements valued it from $427 million to $627 million as part of an alleged scheme to both lower insurance premiums and to get favorable loan terms. Various real estate brokers suggested that the property was worth anywhere from $300 million to $1 billion.

== See also ==
- List of residences of presidents of the United States
- Lists of presidential trips made by Donald Trump
- Mar-a-Lago face
