= Stephen Trafton =

Banker and land speed record holder

Stephen J. Trafton
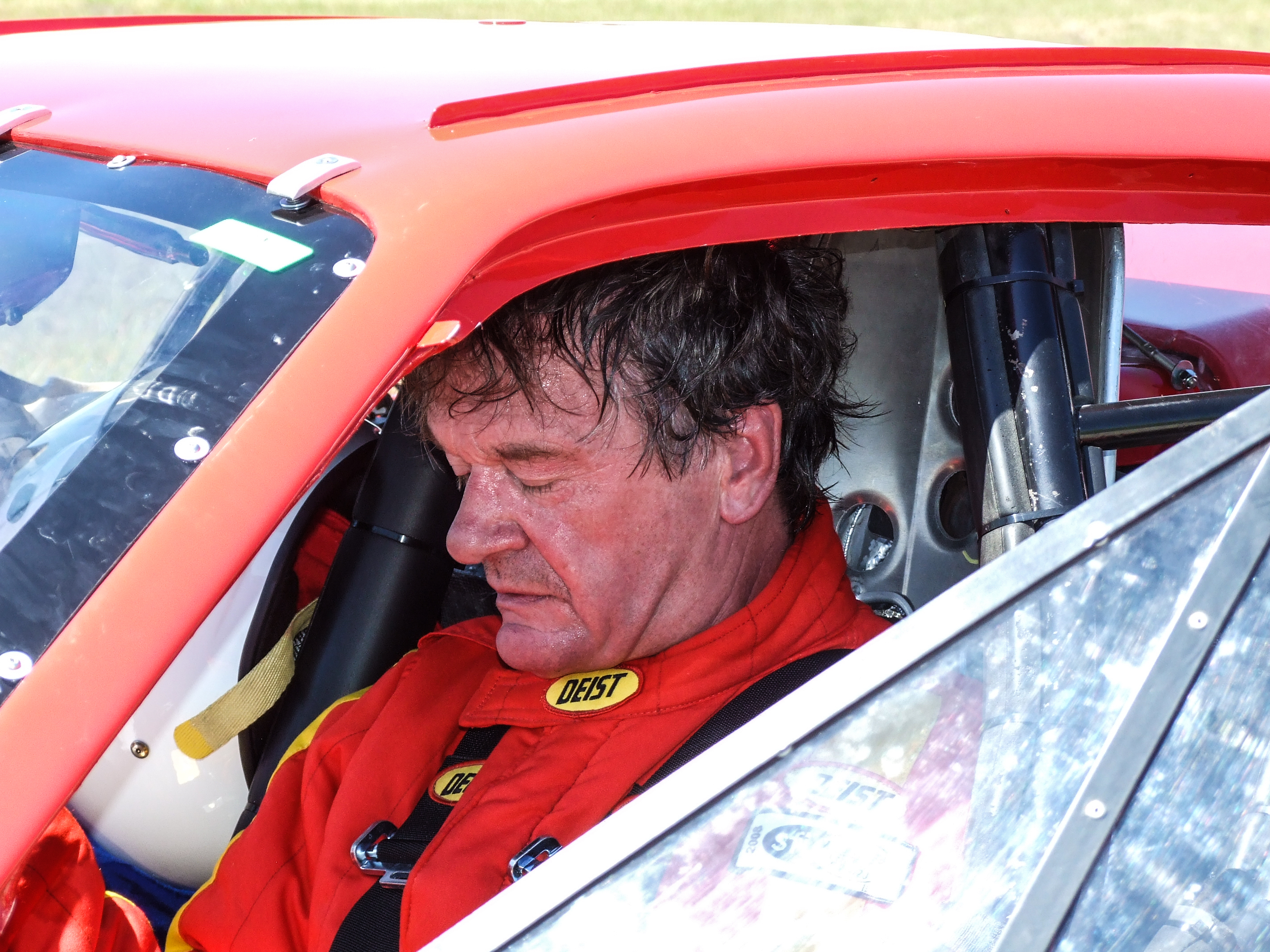
- Born: September 17, 1946 (age 79); Mount Vernon, Washington
- Education: Washington State University
- Occupation: Banker
- Known for: Land Speed Record One of the largest judgments against the U.S. Government Research of Sir John Franklin Expedition in 12 Arctic Explorations
- Website: BlackHorseRacing.com

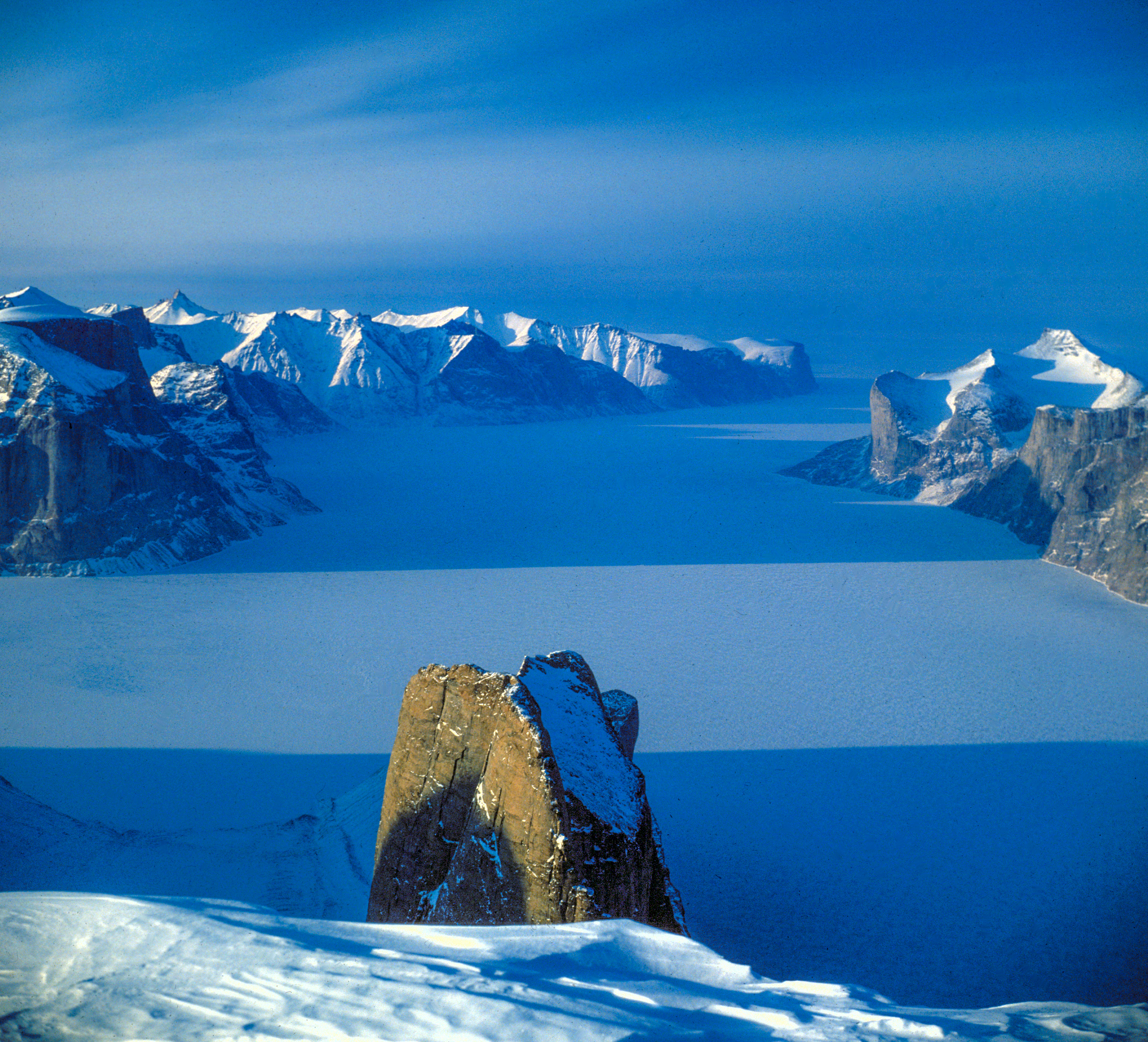
Panorama from first ascent of Baffin Island's Broad Peak in Canadian Arctic

Stephen Trafton is a financial turnaround manager, land speed record holder, Arctic explorer and historian. In his position as the head of a major American bank, he also pursued a landmark breach-of-contract legal action against the U.S. Government. The suit asserted that the Federal Government is liable for damages due to a breach-of-contract on its part, even if that breach was caused by congressional action. This principle was upheld by the United States Supreme Court in a 7 to 2 ruling.

== Career ==
In July 1990, during the Savings and Loan crisis, Stephen Trafton was hired by the nation's fifth largest S&L, Glendale Federal Bank, to devise a plan to save it from seizure by federal bank regulators. In March 1992, he was named Chairman, CEO and President of the bank and its holding company, Glenfed. Trafton then instigated and led one of the largest private (non government assisted) recapitalization and restructurings of a troubled financial institution in U.S. history. This action was credited with saving American taxpayers $4 - $5 billion, if it had been seized and liquidated by the federal Resolution Trust Corporation (RTC).

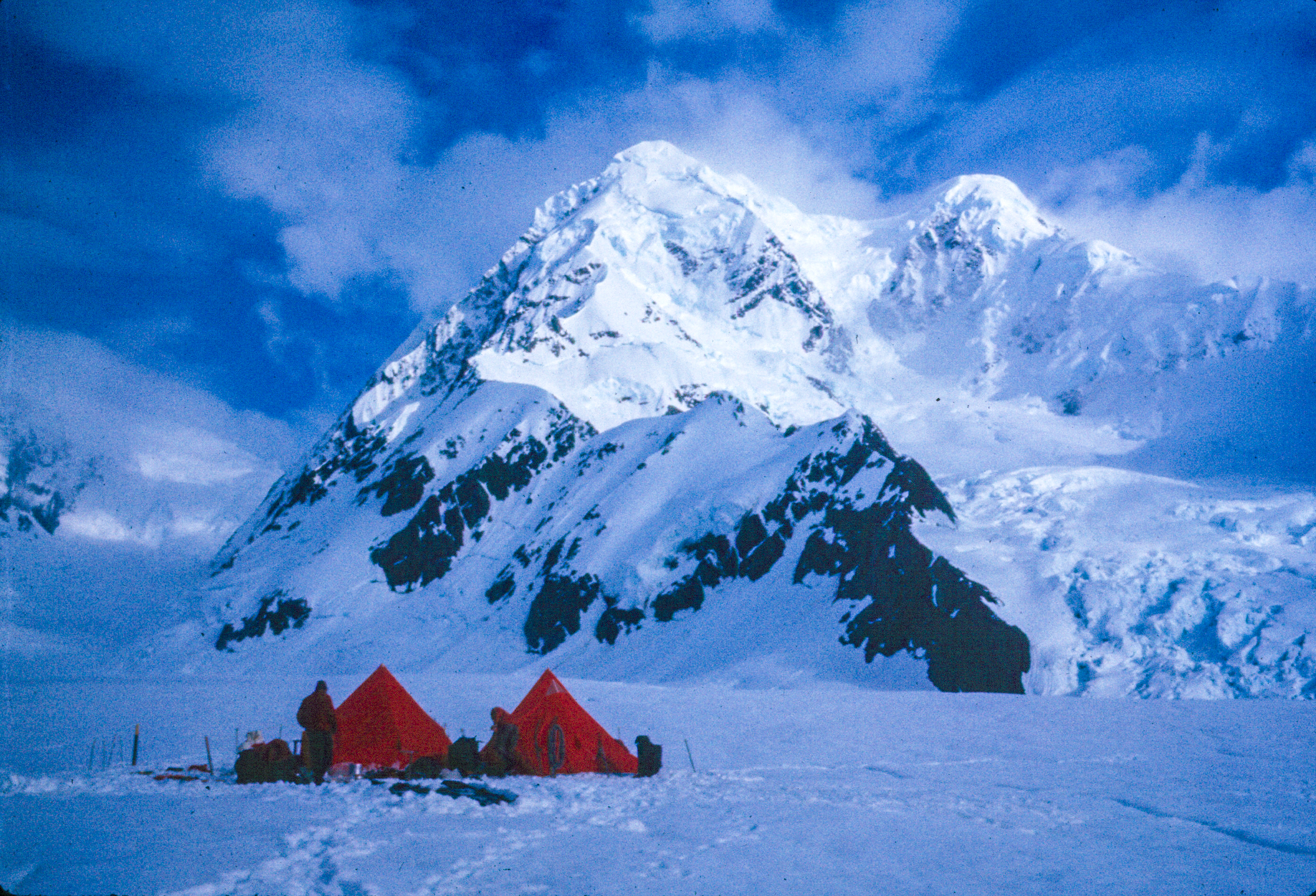
Mount Fairweather 1977

During his tenure, Trafton also oversaw a major breach-of-contract lawsuit against the Federal Government involving the passage and implementation of certain provisions of the Financial Institutions Reform, Recovery, and Enforcement Act of 1989 (FIRREA). Despite the government's arguments to the contrary, including the assertion that Trafton and Glendale were simply trying to defraud the Federal Government, the United States Supreme Court sided with Glendale. The court affirmed the principle that the U.S. Government cannot breach contracts with impunity. As a result, Glendale was initially awarded $908.9 million by the Court of Federal Claims. This was one of the largest ever judgments against the U.S.Government and helped to label Trafton as a turnaround specialist. Trafton's successful court-case against the Federal Government was profiled in the Los Angeles Business Journal, Fortune Magazine, Business Week, The American Banker, Forbes, The Los Angeles Times, The New York Times, and The Seattle Times.

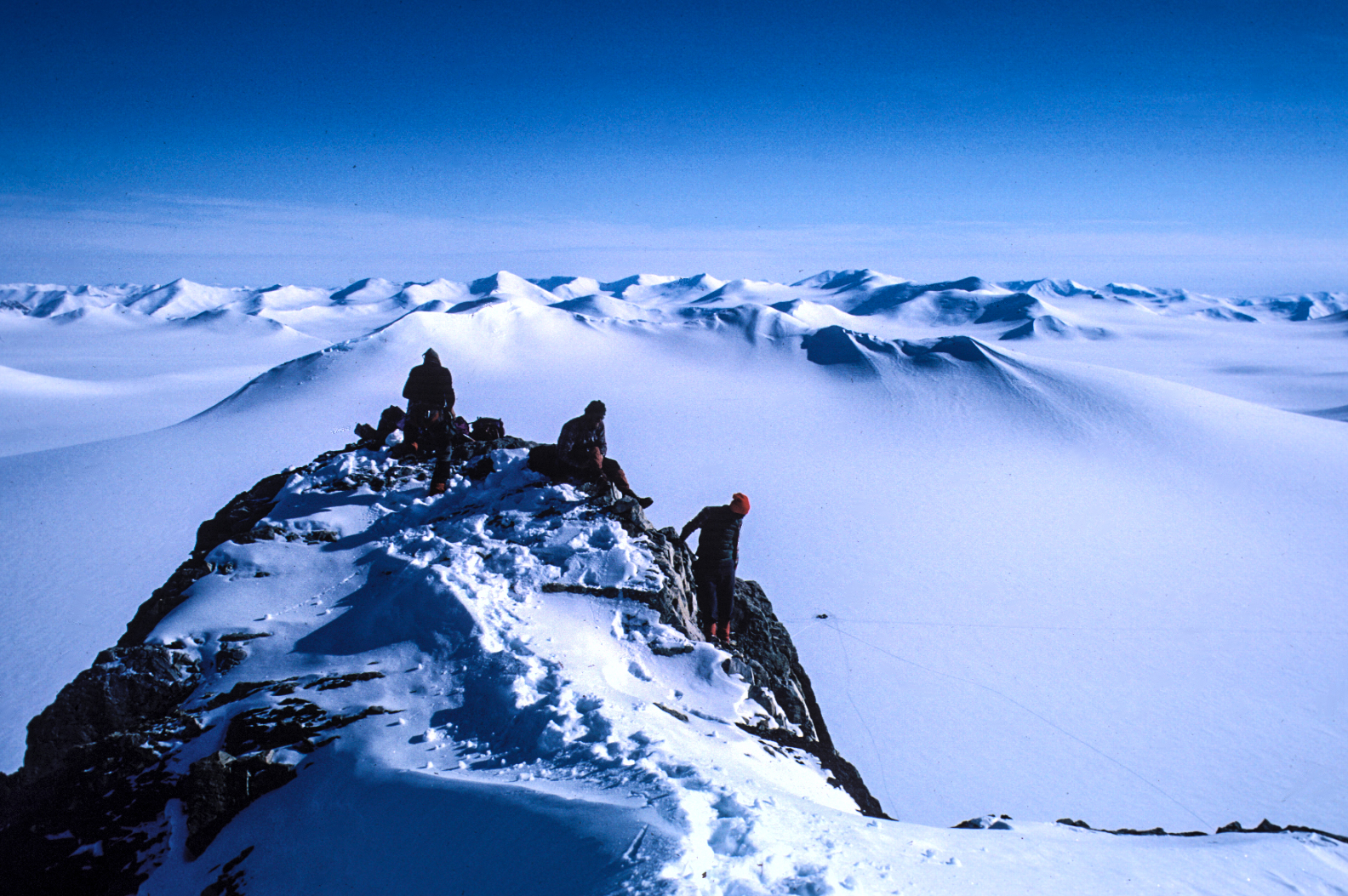
First Ascent of DeHaven Peak at 80° N

Trafton is also cited as an Arctic explorer, historical researcher, driver of the world's fastest Ferrari, author, and adventurer.

== Other Activities ==
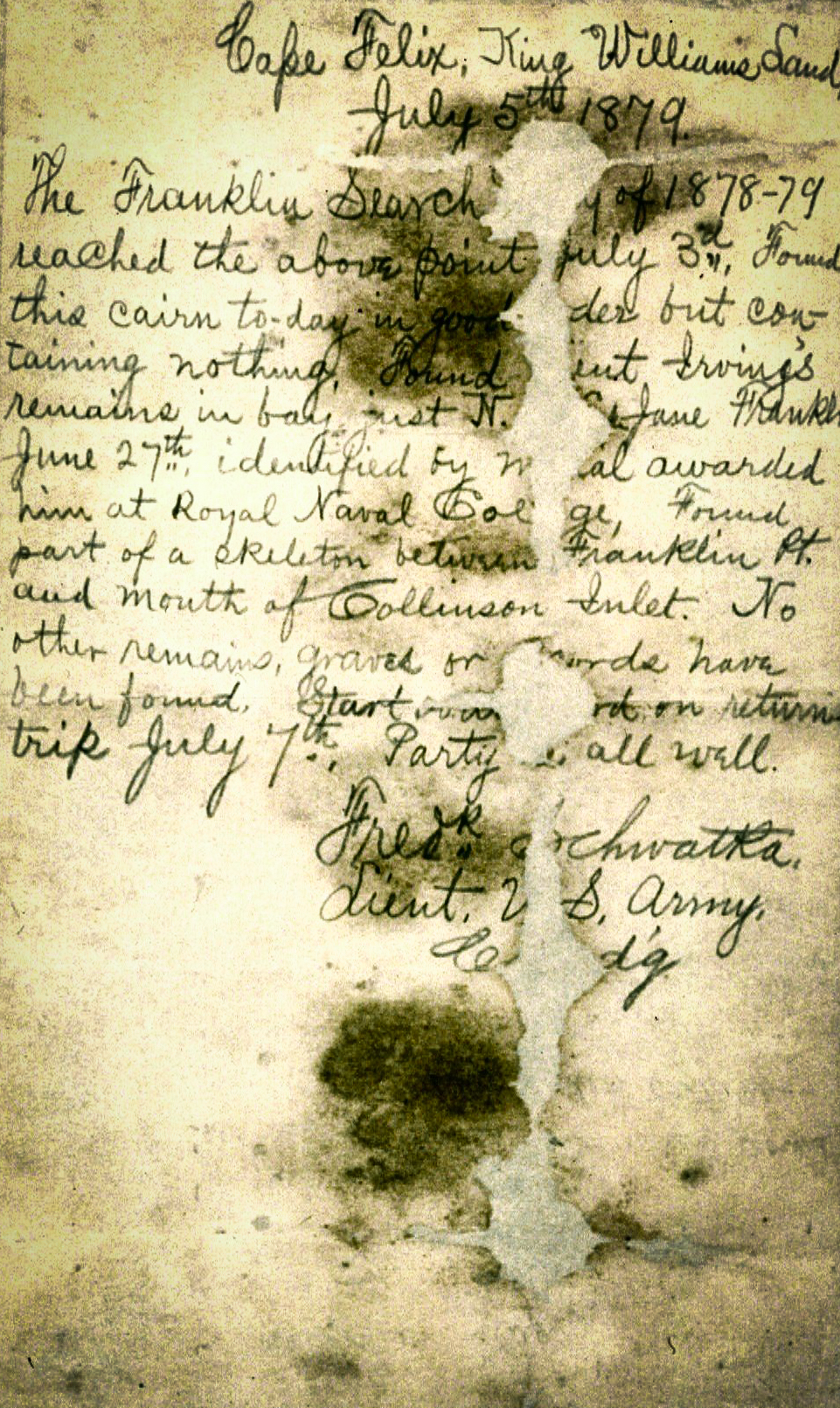
Found Lieut. Schwatka note

- Set a Land Speed Record of 275.401 mph in 2010 by driving his AA Blown Fuel Modified Sports racer at the Bonneville Salt Flats.
- Chronicled and photographed various High Arctic historical sites from the 1845 disappearance of Sir John Franklin and his 129 man crew.
- Explored the Arctic, leading 12 expeditions with 32 first ascents north of the Arctic Circle going as far north as 82 degrees.
- Survived a massive avalanche on remote Baffin Island and writes about this experience in his book, At The Edge.
