= Alvarez and Marsal =

Global professional services firm

Alvarez & Marsal Holdings, LLC
- Type: Private (LLC)
- Industry: Professional services
- Founded: 1983; 43 years ago
- Founders: Tony Alvarez II; Bryan Marsal
- Headquarters: New York City, US
- Area served: Worldwide
- Key people: Tony Alvarez II (co-CEO); Bryan Marsal (co-CEO)
- Services: Performance improvement; Turnaround management; Corporate restructuring; Transaction advisory; Global forensics and dispute; Tax advisory; Valuation services; Investment banking; Enterprise risk management; Corporate governance; Executive benefits consulting
- Number of employees: 10,000+ (2025)
- Website: alvarezandmarsal.com

Alvarez & Marsal Holdings, LLC (A&M) is a global professional services firm notable for its work in turnaround management and performance improvement of a number of large, high-profile businesses both in the US and abroad such as Lehman Brothers, HealthSouth, Tribune Company, Warnaco, Interstate Bakeries, Target, Darden Restaurants, Arthur Andersen and FTX.

== History ==
Alvarez & Marsal was founded in 1983 by Tony Alvarez II, former Coopers & Lybrand workout specialist and Bryan Marsal, a former Citibank workout banker, after the two met and worked together at Norton Simon Inc. They created a professional services firm focused on turnaround management, corporate restructuring and operational performance improvement in an area where previously individual executives operated. The first turnaround client of the firm was Timex Corporation. A&M grew slowly through the 1980s and 1990s with a small team focused on restructuring based in New York and, by 1994, a satellite office in Los Angeles.

During the 2000s, while continuing to specialise in turnaround work, and continuing to take executive and Chief Restructuring Officer roles, the firm expanded its practice and grew its revenues with much of the increase coming from private equity firms that hired A&M for services across the investment life cycle, from due diligence and performance improvement through to asset sales.

By 2013, Alvarez & Marsal had grown to over 3000 personnel working from 55 offices around the world.

== Notable projects ==
=== Lehman Brothers ===
Bryan Marsal was reportedly one of the first people contacted by Harvey R. Miller on hearing that Lehman Brothers was likely to need to file for Chapter 11 protection, receiving a call at 10:30 at night on September 14 while he was watching a football game. Marsal was appointed as Lehman's chief restructuring officer in September 2008 and in November he was named Lehman's CEO, replacing Richard S. Fuld, Jr. Somewhat controversially, Marsal allowed Fuld to retain an office at the failed bank, "if he has nowhere better to go", although Fuld was not paid for his assistance in unwinding the assets of the bank.

Lehman Brothers was left with about 20 employees following its failure and sale of units to Barclays and Nomura Holdings and subsequently appointed a number of Partners and staff from Alvarez & Marsal to serve as interim executives for the bankrupt bank. In September 2012, there were fifty full-time Alvarez & Marsal executives working on unwinding the assets, along with over 250 staff employed by the bank.

=== HealthSouth ===
When HealthSouth found itself subject to far reaching fraud investigations in 2003, which resulted in its top management admitting to fraud, the company found itself with an overstated income of $1.3 billion between 1996 and 2002, while it had suffered an actual loss of $1.8 billion. The company's founder, chairman, and chief executive officer, Richard M. Scrushy denied the fraud. The company soon hired Alvarez and Marsal to lead the 'turnaround' and to do the hard work necessary to stabilize the company so that problems could be corrected and recovery started. At HealthSouth, Marsal who served as CRO cut 250 jobs at HealthSouth's corporate campus in Birmingham and sold off assets such as poorly performing hospitals and all but two of HealthSouth's fleet of 12 private jets that included a Gulfstream V, multiple Cessna Citations, and a $12 million Sikorsky S-76C, that the business had accrued. As a result, the company avoided bankruptcy and relisted on the NYSE in 2006.

== Industry reports ==
Alvarez & Marsal produces several strategic reports. These reports include the A&M Activist Alert (AAA), a statistical analysis and predictor of shareholder activism in Europe; the Banking Pulse Report, which compares the profitability and resilience performance metrics of key banks across specific regions and; The Shape of Retail report series, a compilation of data and commentary on the sector’s performance and trends.

== Competitors ==
Alvarez & Marsal often competes for its traditional turnaround and interim management work with other specialty firms such as Berkeley Research Group, FTI Consulting and AlixPartners, and since 2001 has been competing with more traditional consulting firms, such as McKinsey & Company, Boston Consulting Group, Bain & Company for work supporting Private Equity funds and corporations.

== Criticism ==
Competitors have suggested that Alvarez & Marsal has considered its own business objectives while restructuring failing companies, pointing to a deal with Enron Corp.'s accounting firm, Arthur Andersen as an example. While dismantling Andersen, they note Alvarez & Marsal hired six turnaround specialists from the firm. At Lehman Brothers, A&M received nearly $500 million in fees over the three years following the bank's collapse making the Lehman bankruptcy the most expensive (and arguably the most complex) in history as of 2013.

In December 2024, Alvarez & Marsal’s profits dipped after it had offered £1 million pay deals to attract staff from major accounting firms. A&M’s European sector saw a turnover from professional services to rise up by 30% to €570 millions.

== See also ==
- Sergio Moro, worked for the firm from 2020 to 2021
- Marc Sherman, lawyer who works for the firm
