= Michael Jackson: The Magic and the Madness =

Biography of Michael Jackson

- Author: J. Randy Taraborrelli
- Subject: Michael Jackson
- Genre: Biography
- Publisher: Citadel Press
- Publication date: May 1991
- Publication place: United States
- Media type: Print
- Pages: 625
- ISBN: 1559720646

Michael Jackson: The Magic and the Madness, later expanded and re-released as Michael Jackson: The Magic, The Madness, The Whole Story, 1958–2009, is a book by American biographer J. Randy Taraborrelli, chronicling the life of American singer Michael Jackson. The book was originally released in May 1991 by Birch Lane/Carol Publishing Group, and an updated version was released in August 2009, shortly after Jackson's death, by Grand Central Publishing.

== Summary ==
The book examines Jackson as well as his "contentious and litigious family" and the "consequences of great wealth and fame" on them. The author describes the family as "dysfunctional", and attributes many of Jackson's characteristics to his contentious relationship with his abusive father.

The updated version includes interviews with Lisa Marie Presley, who "revealed her thoughts on the child sex abuse charges Michael faced in 1993" in the book, saying: "I believed he didn't do anything wrong, and that he was wrongly accused and, yes, I started falling for him. I wanted to save him. I felt that I could do it".

== Writing and release ==
In writing the book, Taraborrelli claimed to have "interviewed 400 people and even hired a private detective to sniff out sources he'd been searching for", and asserted that an associate of Jackson's had offered "a cash settlement to squash publication".

The book was originally released in May 1991 by Birch Lane/Carol Publishing Group, and an updated version was released in August 2009, shortly after Jackson's death, by Grand Central Publishing. On the sixth anniversary of the death of Michael Jackson, Mehta Publishing House released the book in the Marathi language. It was translated into Marathi from English by Reshma Kulkarni.

== Critical response ==
Reviewing the updated release following Jackson's death Justin Moyer of The Washington Post praised the depth of access that Taraborrelli had with Jackson and his family, but found the writing itself less laudable, writing, "Taraborrelli plays Virgil on the Gloved One's Dantean descent, armed with an enthusiasm for all things Jackson but ill-served by clunky prose". Michael Anderson of The New York Times was also critical, characterizing Taraborrelli as a "pruriently obsessive fan", and stating that the subject "seems to escape the author", and that the book "is crammed with nudge-nudge, wink-wink trivia... but does little to illuminate Mr. Jackson's irresistibly captivating stage presence".

The Gay & Lesbian Review said that Michael Jackson – The Magic, the Madness, the Whole Story was a "comprehensive and even-handed biography".

In a 2015 retrospective on Jackson, NBC News noted that "Taraborrelli has written what might be the definitive biography of the star".

== See also ==
- Madonna: An Intimate Biography, by J. Randy Taraborrelli
