= Turnaround management =

Strategy to regenerate a company's performance

Turnaround management is a process dedicated to corporate renewal. It uses analysis and planning to save troubled companies and return them to solvency and to identify the reasons for failing performance in the market and rectify them. Turnaround management involves management review, root failure cause analysis, and SWOT analysis to determine why the company is failing. Once analysis is completed, a long term strategic plan and restructuring plan are created. These plans may or may not involve a bankruptcy filing. Once approved, turnaround professionals begin to implement the plan, continually reviewing its progress and making changes to the plan as needed to ensure the company returns to solvency.

== Turnaround managers ==
Turnaround managers are also called turnaround practitioners and often are interim managers who only stay as long as it takes to achieve the turnaround. Assignments can take anything from 3 to 24 months depending on the size of the organization and the complexity of the job. Turnaround management does not only apply to distressed companies, it, in fact, can help in any situation where direction, strategy or a general change of the ways of working needs to be implemented. Therefore, turnaround management is closely related to change management, transformation management and post-merger-integration management. High growth situations, for example, are one typical scenario where turnaround experts also help. More and more turnaround managers are becoming a one-stop-shop and provide help with corporate funding (working closely with banks and the Private Equity community) and with professional services firms (such as lawyers and insolvency practitioners) to have access to a full range of services that are typically needed in a turnaround process. Most turnaround managers are freelancers and work on day rates. The job often involves frequent travel. Others work for large corporations and have permanent positions.

== Stages ==
There are stages in repositioning an organization:

1. The evaluation and assessment stage
2. The acute needs stage
3. The restructuring stage
4. The stabilization stage
5. The revitalization stage

The first stage is delineated as onset of decline (1). Factors that cause this circumstance are new innovations by competitors or a downturn in demand, which leads to a loss of market share and revenue. But stable companies may also find themselves in this stage because of maladministration or the production of goods that are not interesting for customers. In public organizations are external shocks, like political or economic, reasons that could cause a destabilization of a performance.

Sometimes an onset of decline can be temporary and through a corrective action and recovery (2) been fixed.

The reposition situation (3) is the point in the process where the minimally accepted performance is long-lasting below its limits. In empirical studies the performance turnaround is measured through financial success indicators. These measures ignore other performance indicators such as environmental impact, employee welfare, and corporate social responsibility. The organizational leaders need to decide, if a strategy change should happen or the current strategy be kept, which could instead lead to a takeover or insolvency. In the public sector, performance is characterized by multiple aims that are politically contested and constructed. Nevertheless, different performance criteria are used by different stakeholders and even if their use results in the same criteria, it is likely that different weights apply to them. So if a public organization is situated in a turnaround situation, it is subject to the dimensions of a performance (e.g. equity, efficiency, effectiveness) as well as its approach to their relative importance. This political point of view suggests that a miscarriage in a public service may happen when key stakeholders are continuously dissatisfied by performance and therefore the survival of an organisation might be unclear. In the public sector, success and failure is judged by higher bodies that bestow financial, legal, or other different resources on service providers.

If decision makers choose to take a new course because of the realization that actions are required to prevent an ongoing decline, they need at first to search for new strategies (4). Questions that need to be asked here are if the search for a reposition strategy should be participative and decentralized, secretive and centralized, intuitive and incremental, or analytic and rational. Here, the selection must be made quickly, since a second turnaround may not be possible after new or existing poor performance. This means that a compressed strategy process is necessary and therefore an extensive participation and analysis may be precluded. The same applies to the public sector, because the public authorities are highly visible and politically under pressure to rapidly implement a recovery plan.

Once the fifth stage has been reached, the selection of a new strategy (5a) has been made by the company. Researchers typically concentrate on this part of the reposition process. Most focus on the structure and its impact on the implemented strategy's performance. It is even stated by the scientist that a commercial success is again possible after a failing of the company. But different risk-averse groups, like suppliers, customers or staff may be against a change or are sceptical about the implementation of the strategy. These circumstances could result in a blockade of the realization. Also the conclusion is conceivable that no escape strategy is found (5b), as a result that some targets cannot be achieved. In the public sector, it is difficult to find a strategy for recovery, which therefore could lead to a permanent failure. The case may also be that though a recovery plan is technically feasible, it might not be politically executable.

The implication of the new strategy (6) occurs in the following sixth stage. It is a necessary determinant of organizational success and has to be a fundamental element of a valid turnaround model. Nevertheless, no empirical study sets a certain turnaround strategy.

The outcomes of the turnaround strategies can result in three different ways. First of all a terminal decline (7a) may occur. This is possible for situations where a bad strategy was chosen or a good strategy might have been implemented poorly. Another conceivable outcome is a continued failure (7b). Here is the restructuring plan that failed, but dominant members within the company and the environment still believe that a repositioning is possible. In this case, they need to restart at stage four and look for a new strategy. Should an outcome of the new strategy turns out to be good, a turnaround (7c) is called successful. This is achieved when its appropriate benchmark reaches the level of commercial success, like it was the case before the onset of decline. This is commonly measured in a timeframe between two and four years.

== Techniques ==
There are different techniques that can be applied to cause a repositioning. The four main techniques are known as Retrenchment, Repositioning, Replacement and Renewal:

=== Retrenchment ===
The Retrenchment strategy of the turnaround management describes wide-ranging short-term actions to reduce financial losses, to stabilize the company and to work against the problems that caused the poor performance. The essence of the Retrenchment strategy is therefore to reduce the scope and size of a business through the Shrinking Selective Strategy. This can be done by selling assets, abandoning difficult markets, stopping unprofitable production lines, downsizing and outsourcing. These procedures are used to generate resources for use in more productive activities and prevent financial losses. Retrenchment is therefore all about an efficient orientation and a refocus on the core business. Despite that many companies are prevented from performing cutbacks, some manage to overcome the resistance. As a result, they can attain market position despite the reductions they made and increase productivity and efficiency. Most practitioners even mention that a successful turnaround without a planned retrenchment is rarely feasible.

=== Repositioning ===
The repositioning strategy, also known as "entrepreneurial strategy", attempts to generate revenue with new innovations and change in product portfolio and market position. This includes developing new products, entering new markets, exploring alternative sources of revenue and modifying the image or the mission of a company.

=== Replacement ===
Replacement is a strategy where top managers or the chief executive officer (CEO) are replaced. This turnaround strategy is used because it is theorized that new managers bring recovery and strategic change as a result of their different experiences and backgrounds from their previous work. It is also indispensable to be aware that new CEOs can cause problems, which obstruct turnarounds. For example, they might change effective organized routines or introduce new administrative overheads and guidelines. Replacement is especially qualified for situations with opinionated CEOs, which are not able to think impartially about certain problems. Instead, they rely on their past experience for running the business or belittle the situation as short-termed. The established leaders fail therefore to recognize that a change in the business strategy is necessary to keep the company viable. There are also situations where CEOs do notice that a current strategy is less successful than desired. But this does not necessarily imply that they are capable or even qualified enough to accomplish a turnaround. Should a company oppose the replacement of a leader, this could end in a situation where the declining process will be continued. As a result, qualified employees resign, the organisation is discredited and the resources left will run out as time goes by.

=== Renewal ===
With a Renewal a company pursues long-term actions, which are supposed to result in successful managerial performance. The first step here is to analyze the existing structures within the organization. This examination may end with a closure of some divisions, a development of new markets/projects or an expansion of other business areas. A Renewal may also lead to side effects within a company, like removing efficient routines or resources. On the other hand, innovative core competencies are implemented, which increase knowledge and a stabilize the company value.

== Hurdles or challenges ==
Three critical hurdles or challenges that management faces in any repositioning program:

1. Design: What type of restructuring is appropriate for dealing with the specific challenge, problem, or opportunity that the company faces?
2. Execution: How should the restructuring process be managed and the many barriers to restructuring overcome so that as much value is created as possible?
3. Marketing: How should the restructuring be explained and portrayed to investors so that value created inside the company is fully credited to its stock price?
