= Edna Edgerton =

American politician (1893–1956)

- Edgerton c. 1946

Member of the Connecticut House of Representatives from Stamford
- In office 1943–1949
- Preceded by: Robert F. Mulrooney; James H. Miller
- Succeeded by: Melvin M. Dichter; Daniel F. B. Hickey

Personal details
- Born: Edna Anna Fischer; May 15, 1893 New York City, U.S.
- Died: January 28, 1956 (aged 62) Venezuela
- Party: Republican
- Spouse: Malcolm J. Edgerton (m. 1917)
- Children: 3

Edna Anna Edgerton (May 15, 1893 – January 28, 1956) was an American politician who served in the Connecticut House of Representatives from 1943 to 1949, representing the city of Stamford as a Republican. Born in New York City, Edgerton later moved to Connecticut, where she became involved in civic and social service initiatives. In 1948, she co-founded the Connecticut Intercollegiate State Legislature, an annual mock session of the Connecticut General Assembly for college students.

During her three terms in the Connecticut House, Edgerton focused on legislation concerning health services, education, and child welfare. She introduced a bill establishing the State Commission on Alcoholism and was appointed to serve on it in 1945. The commission developed a program that funded clinics for the treatment of alcoholics. She also worked on legislation to introduce stricter adoption standards, equalize the pay of male and female teachers, and create a state psychiatric facility for children. Edgerton and her husband died in a plane crash in 1956 while traveling in Venezuela.

== Personal life ==
Malcolm and Edna Edgerton

Edna Anna Fischer was born in New York City on May 15, 1893, to Carl and Anna Fischer. She was one of six siblings. Her father was a music publisher, and she developed an early interest in music, attending the New York Collegiate Institute (also known as Miss Mary Schoonmaker's School for Girls), a private school on the Upper West Side of Manhattan, for its musical training.

Fischer pursued a career in music before marrying Malcolm J. Edgerton on June 7, 1917. Edna became a homemaker, and Malcolm became a broker and member of the New York Stock Exchange. They had three children: Malcolm, Janet, and Edna. In 1942, their daughter Janet married Jonathan Trumbull Lanman, a physician and brother of philanthropist William K. Lanman. Their daughter Edna died of polio in 1951.

In 1925, the Edgertons purchased a summer home at Wallack's Point in Stamford, Connecticut. They moved in permanently in 1933. Edna was an avid gardener, and from 1931 to 1941, she served as president of the nonprofit Federated Garden Clubs of Connecticut. In the early 1950s, she was involved with the Garden Club of America, serving on its conservation committee and forum committee. She was a member of the Connecticut College Arboretum's advisory committee.

== Civic and social work ==
Edgerton's interest in public service began while living in New York, following a visit to Harlem Hospital. At a New England Society dinner, Edgerton remarked to a local pediatrician that she had been "considerably disturbed" by what she had witnessed during the visit, in particular the treatment of Black pediatric patients, who were often forced to remain in the hospital while not acutely ill due to a lack of options for convalescent care. The pediatrician challenged Edgerton to raise money for a convalescent program, and she agreed, prompting her to become involved in social services and volunteer work. She served on the boards of Harlem Hospital and Bellevue Hospital.

Connecticut Intercollegiate State Legislature members at the 1955 session

After moving to Connecticut, Edgerton became involved in local issues, serving on the boards of the Connecticut Mental Hygiene Society and the Connecticut Conference of Social Work. She also served on the board of the Stamford Children's Home and became its president in 1935.

Edgerton co-founded the Connecticut Intercollegiate State Legislature (CISL), which held an annual mock session of the Connecticut General Assembly for college students. The first session, held in April 1948, included students from 15 institutions. Participants in the organization included future politician Margaret Heckler, then a student at Albertus Magnus College, and future diplomat John Bolton, a student at Yale University.

Edgerton remained active in local affairs and organizations after retiring from politics, participating in citizens' committees on education and community development.

== Political career ==
Edgerton, Raymond E. Baldwin, and Clare Boothe Luce in 1944

Edgerton entered politics after moving to Connecticut. In a 1948 interview, she credited her decision to run for the Connecticut House of Representatives in part to World War II. She said that many of her interests "seemed futile" during wartime, and when asked to run for the House, she felt that "perhaps here was a place where I could be of some immediate home front value."

Edgerton was first elected to the Connecticut House of Representatives in 1942, and she served three terms as one of two representatives from the city of Stamford. She served her first term alongside Joseph H. Swathel, second alongside Daniel F. B. Hickey, and third alongside Melvin M. Dichter. She was the first woman and the first representative who was not a lawyer to serve on the subcommittee of the General Assembly's Judiciary Committee.

Edgerton did not run for reelection to the House of Representatives in 1948, instead running for the 27th district of the Connecticut State Senate. She faced incumbent Vincent A. Giampietro in the Republican primary and won the nomination. In the general election, Edgerton was defeated by Democratic opponent Edward C. Czupka.

=== Political positions and legislation ===
==== State Commission on Alcoholism ====
In 1945, Edgerton introduced a bill that proposed a five-person commission to study alcoholism in the state. The commission was established (originally named the State Fund for Inebriates, it was renamed the State Commission on Alcoholism in 1947 pursuant to legislation introduced by Edgerton), and Governor Raymond E. Baldwin appointed Edgerton, alcoholism researcher Selden D. Bacon, local doctors Thomas P. Murdoch and Arthur H. Jackson, and state's attorney Abraham Ullman inaugural members. The commission established free outpatient clinics to treat alcoholism in New Haven and Hartford, funded by a diversion of 9% of permit and license fees collected by the State Liquor Control Commission. Connecticut's program was among the first publicly funded treatment programs for alcoholism in the United States.

Edgerton remained on the commission until June 1949. In 1948, she said that while she had at first been dismissive of the issue, believing there were problems "more directly the state's responsibility than the care of alcoholics", her mind was changed after attending an Alcoholics Anonymous meeting in Greenwich with a social worker. She remarked that "this work is a state problem, in that it affects such a proportion of its people."

==== Child welfare ====
Children at High Meadows doing arts and crafts with an instructor in 1962

In the 1943 session, Edgerton worked on a bill that allowed judges to require a year's wait before finalizing an adoption, with the alternative option of a qualified social worker investigating and approving the adoption. In 1947, she opposed legislation that would have made investigations into adoptee health and welfare discretionary rather than compulsory, and she introduced legislation that sought to transfer all financial responsibility for wards of the state to the state itself in order to relieve individual towns from sharing in the expenses.

Edgerton was instrumental in the establishment of the Connecticut Child Study and Treatment Home (later known as High Meadows), a state psychiatric institution for children aged six to sixteen. Edgerton was a board member of the Connecticut Mental Hygiene Society, which advocated for the facility, and was appointed to the Governor's Committee on a Child Psychiatric Study Home. In 1947, she included plans developed by the committee in a bill seeking an appropriation of funds to purchase land and construct an institution. The General Assembly approved the institution in 1949, though it did not open until 1957 due to financial constraints. In July 1957, the board of trustees named a building for Edgerton. High Meadows remained in operation until 2009.

==== Education and other legislation ====
Edgerton authored and supported bills to fund education and increase schoolteachers' pay. In 1945, she worked on a bill to equalize the pay of male and female school faculty. Edgerton noted that "in Stamford, there had been a $700 difference [in salaries]" (equivalent to $12,518 in 2025). Women's salaries were raised to match the men's scale. In 1947, Edgerton introduced a bill to set a state minimum salary of $2,400 (equivalent to $42,921 in 2025) for teachers, and a bill to direct the Connecticut State Board of Education to establish a driver's education course in high schools.

In 1947, Edgerton introduced the bill that designated the white oak as Connecticut's state tree.

=== Later political activity ===
In 1948, Edgerton was elected vice chairman of the Republican State Central Committee, a position she held until she resigned in April 1950. Edgerton did not return to elected office, and in June 1950, she said that she was "out of politics entirely".

== Death ==
Edna and Malcolm Edgerton died in a plane crash in Venezuela on January 28, 1956. They were on vacation and traveling from eastern Venezuela to Caracas when weather conditions forced pilot Charles C. Baughan to divert to nearby Higuerote. Baughan's final communication reported that the plane was 14 miles northeast of Higuerote and preparing to land. Shortly afterward, the plane went missing. It had crashed into a heavily wooded mountaintop southwest of Higuerote. Air searchers located the wreckage on January 30, and ground teams reached the site on January 31. The U.S. embassy in Caracas confirmed that all 10 people on board had died. Edna was 62, and Malcolm was 70.

== Legacy ==
In 1956, the Connecticut College Arboretum established a three-acre wildflower garden in Edgerton's memory. Arboretum director Richard H. Goodwin, professor of botany William Niering, and horticulturist John Stengel designed the garden. It was later renamed the Edgerton and Stengel Wildflower Garden.

In January 1957, the Connecticut General Assembly adopted a joint resolution to place a plaque in Edgerton's memory in the Connecticut State Capitol. The resolution was introduced by Representative Hilda Clarke of Stamford on behalf of students from the Connecticut Intercollegiate State Legislature.

== Electoral history ==
=== 1942 ===
1942 Connecticut House of Representatives election, Stamford
Party	Candidate	Votes	%
Republican	Joseph H. Swathel	9,788	26.62%
Republican	Edna Edgerton	9,755	26.52%
Democratic	James H. Miller (incumbent)	8,640	23.49%
Democratic	John J. McMahon	8,595	23.37%
Total votes		36,778	100.00%
Republican gain from Democratic			

=== 1944 ===
1944 Connecticut House of Representatives election, Stamford
Party	Candidate	Votes	%
Republican	Edna Edgerton (incumbent)	14,353	25.65%
Republican	Daniel F. B. Hickey	14,286	25.53%
Democratic	James H. Miller	13,834	24.73%
Democratic	Alfred A. Volante	13,475	24.09%
Total votes		55,948	100.00%
Republican hold			

=== 1946 ===
1946 Connecticut House of Representatives election, Stamford
Party	Candidate	Votes	%
Republican	Edna Edgerton (incumbent)	12,965	29.54%
Republican	Melvin M. Dichter	12,619	28.75%
Democratic	William T. Keavney	9,242	21.05%
Democratic	John M. Wright	9,070	20.66%
Total votes		43,896	100.00%
Republican hold			

=== 1948 ===
1948 Connecticut State Senate Republican primary election, district 27
Party	Candidate	Votes	%
Republican	Edna Edgerton	3,123	57.50%
Republican	Vincent A. Giampietro (incumbent)	2,166	39.88%
Republican	Barbara Mitchell	142	2.62%
Total votes		5,431	100.00%

1948 Connecticut State Senate election, district 27
Party	Candidate	Votes	%
Democratic	Edward C. Czupka	14,609	50.54%
Republican	Edna Edgerton	14,297	49.46%
Total votes		28,906	100.00%
Democratic gain from Republican			
