= Noroton River =

River in the United States of America

Coordinates: 41.0770°N 73.5170°W

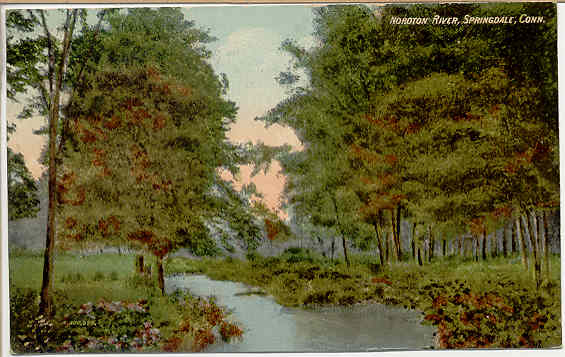
Postcard of river scene (mailed in 1911)

The Noroton River is a 9.4-mile-long (15.1 km) stream which forms most of the border between Stamford and Darien, Connecticut, United States. The river's headwaters are in New Canaan, Connecticut, and flow into Holly Pond. It is the largest flowing body of water between the Mill River/Rippowam River to the west and the Fivemile River to the east, although Stony Brook and the Goodwives River in Darien are not much smaller.

Pollution runoff from Interstate 95 flows down the Noroton River into Holly Pond. In 2009, the Stamford and Darien local governments asked the federal government for an $11.7 million grant to fund 65 percent of an $18 million project for "dredging and ecosystem restoration" in the pond and river, including "construction of wetlands, bioswales and other restoration structures".

Two restaurants are located at the mouth of the river, where U.S. Route 1 (known as the Boston Post Road on the Darien side and East Main Street on the Stamford side) crosses it. Both feature windows offering diners a view of the river. The restaurant on the north side is in Stamford. On the south side, the current Water’s Edge at Giovanni's is the most recent business to occupy a lot where restaurants have been sited since the early 20th century.

== Geography ==
To the west of the river are the Glenbrook and Springdale sections of Stamford; to the east are the Noroton and Noroton Heights sections of Darien. At its southern end, the stream forms a small valley between Noroton Hill to the west and Hollow Tree Ridge to the east. Farther north, in New Canaan, Ponus Ridge is to the east.

=== Crossings ===
North from the mouth of the river (Stamford-Darien border):

- U.S. Route 1 — Boston Post Road (in Darien), East Main Street (in Stamford)
- Interstate 95
- Maple Tree Avenue (Stamford)/West Avenue (Darien)
- Connecticut Route 106—Glenbrook Road (Stamford)/Middlesex Road (Darien)
- Camp Avenue
- Woodway Road

In New Canaan:

- Connecticut Route 15 — Merritt Parkway
- Jelliff Mill Road (named after Jelliff Mill, where a dam of the river creates Jelliff Mill Pond
- Indian Waters Drive
- Frogtown Road
- Wahackme Road (where the river goes through a bird sanctuary)
- Greenley Road
- West Road
- Country Club Road

== History ==
=== Before the 20th century ===
The Siwanoy sachendom of the Wappinger tribe had settled the area before the English came. At the mouth of the river, Indians had a village named "Noroaton".

The area surrounding the river became part of Stamford in the 17th century. In the 1680s, one of the earliest settlements of the English in Darien was founded near the east side of the river, on "Noroton Cove" (the former name of Holly Pond). The settlement included a sawmill built by a dam on the river, just north of where Interstate 95 now crosses it.

During the Revolutionary War, Stephen Weed was released from the infamous Sugar House Prison in New York City in a prisoner exchange. The New Canaan resident then built a stone fort near his home on the east side of the stream, just south of where Frogtown Road crosses the Noroton. "He steadily insisted that the British would raid the parish and that this line of march would be up the Noroton River valley," according to Charles P. Morton's Landmarks of New Canaan, published by the New Canaan Historical Society in 1951. To the south, Middlesex Parish (which later became the town of Darien) had been raided several times during the Revolution. Weed manned the fort as a precaution against a possible attack for nine years, long after the war was over.

In 1912, a New York Times article on recreational summer streetcar trips recommended taking in the view at the Noroton River bridge:

Stand on the bridge over the Noroton at Stamford and take in the first of a series of beautiful pictures that everywhere meet the tourist's gaze. Here is historic interest again, many Revolutionary incidents having taken place around the neighborhood.

The "Revolutionary incidents" in Noroton during the American Revolution were raids by Tories based on Long Island, across the sound, sometimes resulting in fatalities—the incidents that terrified Stephen Weed in the late 18th century. The trolley stopped at the Noroton River, where passengers needed to disembark, walk across the bridge and take another trolley car because there was no through connection at the time. In December 1914, the Darien and Stamford governments agreed to help finance a widening of the bridge taking the Post Road over the Noroton River so that an electric streetcar line could operate over it. The gap in streetcar service was the last one between New York City and Boston.

The Phillips family, heirs of Charles Henry Phillips, who created Phillips Milk of Magnesia, long had a Tudor-style mansion on a four-acre lot along the Noroton River in Glenbrook (where the first Milk of Magnesia factory was located). In the mid-1980s, the property was converted into a condominium development called "River Walk".

Frank Lloyd Wright, working with a landscape architect, Frank Okamura, reshaped a portion of the river running through a 13-acre New Canaan estate for which Wright designed the Rayward-Shepherd House (built between 1956 and 1968).

Flooding on August 19, 1955, caused seven Darien families to be evacuated from their homes along the river. On October 16, two days of heavy rain caused the river to again flood, weakening the roadbed of the New Haven Line and causing 20 cars of a freight train (but not the engine) to derail on the Stamford side of the river just after midnight. None of the six-member crew was hurt. After the flooding, one of a number of floods in the Northeastern United States caused by the same rains, the river "twisted madly through a 120-foot gap in the roadbed" of the New Haven Line near Glenbrook.

== See also ==
- List of rivers of Connecticut
