= Crane-Phillips House =

Historic house in New Jersey, United States

- Crane-Philips House
- U.S. National Register of Historic Places
- New Jersey Register of Historic Places
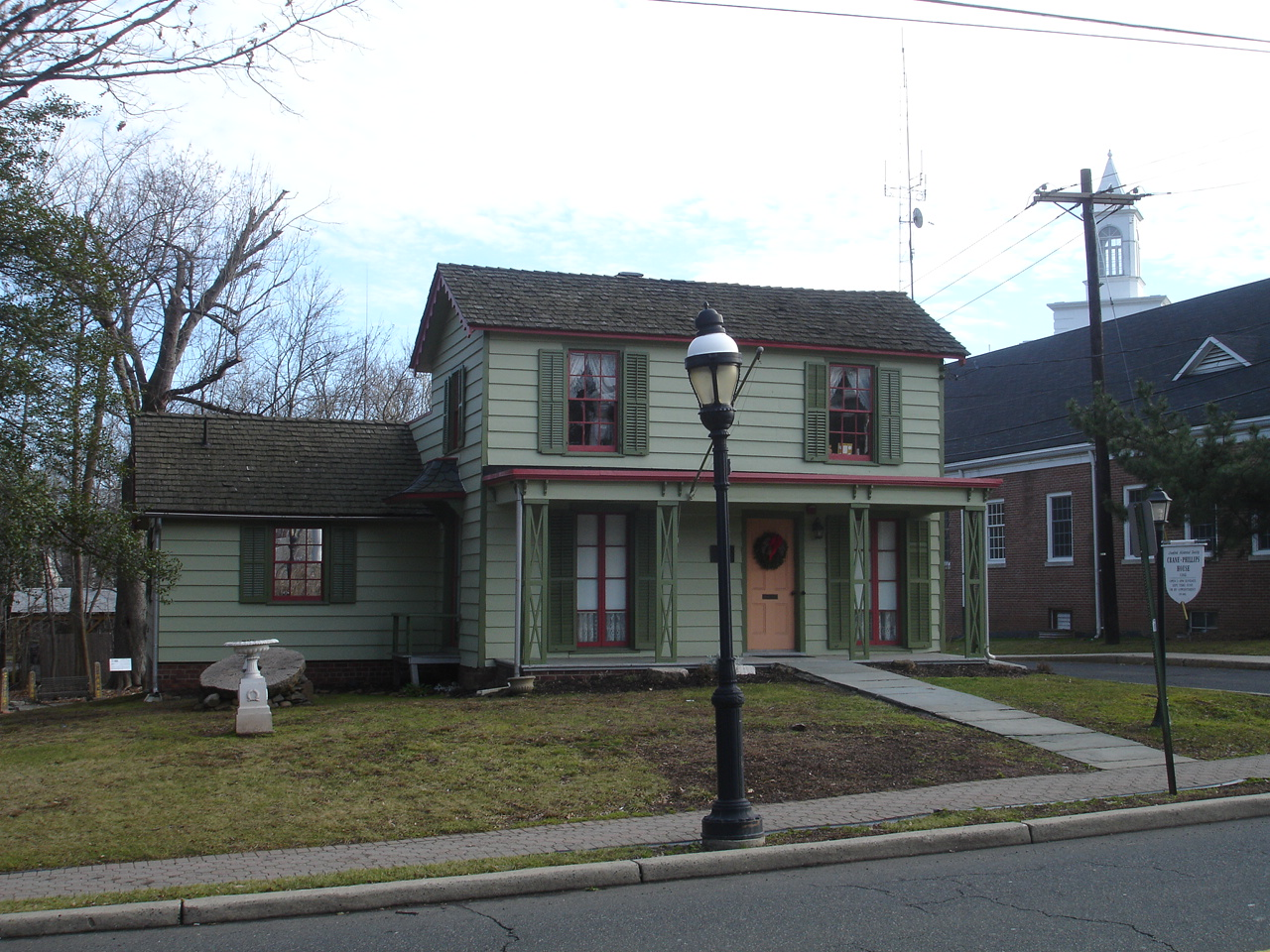

- Location within Union County, New Jersey
- Location: 124 N. Union Avenue; Cranford, New Jersey
- Coordinates: 40°39′29″N 74°18′07″W
- NRHP reference No.: 97000842
- NJRHP No.
- Added to NRHP: August 14, 1997

The Crane-Phillips House, located at 124 N. Union Avenue in Cranford in Union County, New Jersey, United States, is a Victorian cottage in the architectural style of Andrew Jackson Downing, the first American architect. The Crane-Phillips House is now a museum operated by the Cranford Historical Society that offers visitors a glimpse of what life was like for a modest family in the Victorian era of opulence. It illustrates the late 19th century as the era of invention and highlights inventions that changed everyday life for the average person by way of the house's second owners, the Phillips family. Henry J. Phillips, an American Civil War veteran of the 7th New York Militia, was one of the first inventors of the modern kitchen hood. During the war, he had also patented a convertible tent and overcoat for military use. His brother, Charles Henry Phillips, was the inventor of Phillips' Milk of Magnesia.

The museum features a collection of Native American artifacts, American Revolutionary War and American Civil War artifacts, other arms and armaments, 19th century tools and farm implements, a Victorian parlor, and a Victorian girl's bedroom circa 1870. There is also an extensive archives of Cranford-related documents. Changing exhibits include major displays from the Society's large antique clothing collection.

== History ==
"The Little House on the Rahway," as the Crane-Phillips House is known, was first built about 1840 by Josiah Crane (namesake of nearby Josiah Crane Park) as a honeymoon cottage for his son, Josiah Crane Jr. The Cranes were the first settlers to come to the area in the early 18th century (1715), build mills on the river and establish a farm on the west side of the Rahway River. Josiah Crane was the third son of John Crane III; John Crane II was born in Elizabeth in 1723, son of John Crane, who first settled along the river in Cranford around 1715.

Josiah Crane Jr. sold the property in 1867 to Henry and Cecelia Phillips, who lived there until Henry's death on May 6, 1911. It was Mr. and Mrs. Phillips who built most of the cottage in the Downing style.

== Restoration ==
The Cranford Historical Society performed a major restoration project to restore the museum to much the way it looked in the late 19th century, modernize and upgrade, and create new and better permanent exhibits, including an authentic late 19th-century kitchen. The project's completion transformed the "Little House" into a living history museum where docents help bring visitors back in time. The museum features permanent and changing exhibits depicting three centuries of local history as it relates to the history of New Jersey and the nation.

The Crane-Phillips House Museum is on the National and State Register of Historic Places and was named an "American Treasure" by the White House Millennium Council and the National Trust for Historic Preservation in 1999. It is one of several historic houses noted by the Cranford Historical Preservation Advisory Board.

== See also ==
- Historic sites in Cranford, New Jersey
- Rahway River Parkway
