= Glenbrook (Stamford) =

Neighborhood in Fairfield County, Connecticut, US

Coordinates: 41°03′53″N 73°31′34″W

- Neighborhood
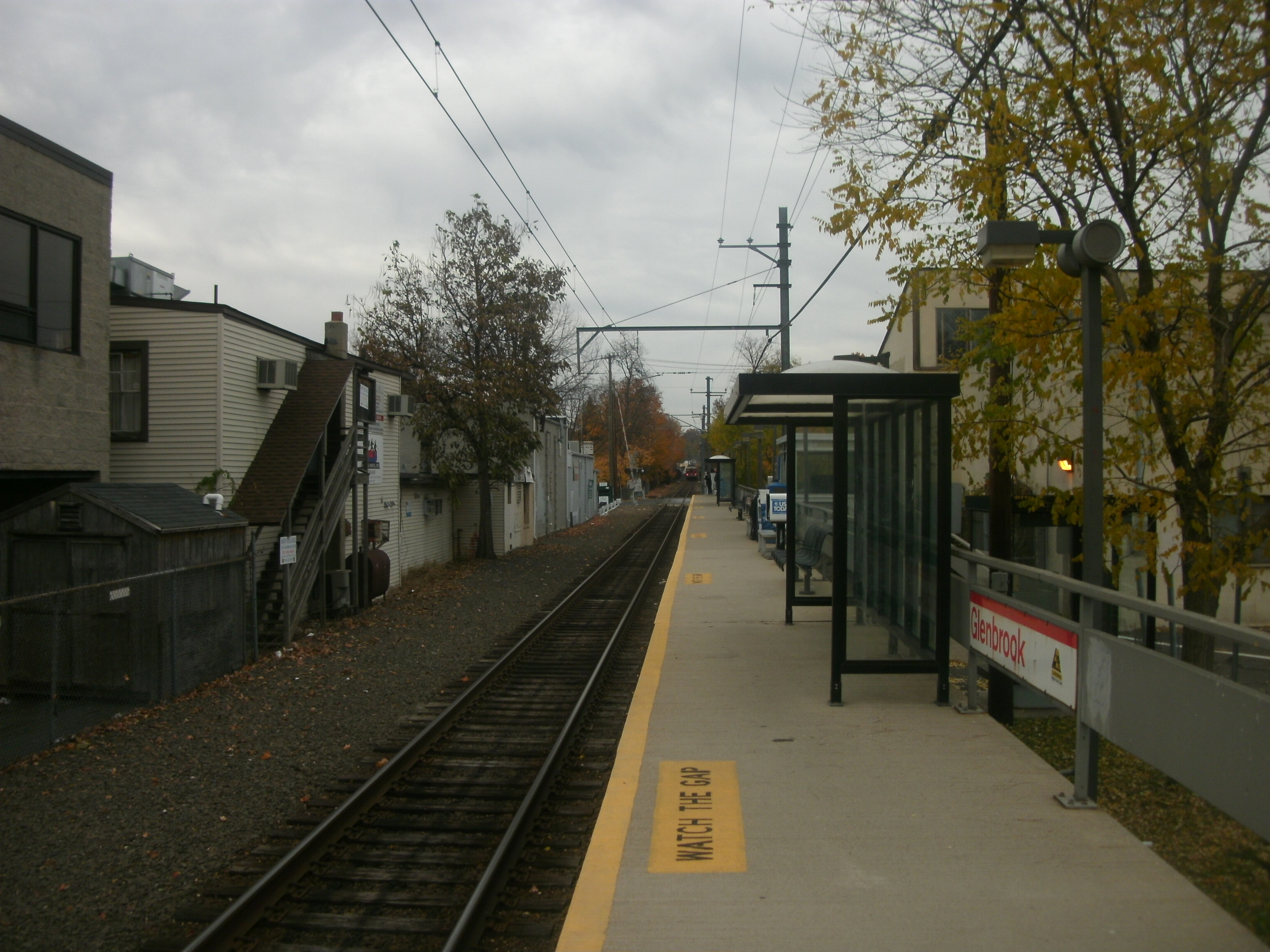
- The platform at Glenbrook station
- Interactive map of Glenbrook
- Country: United States
- State: Connecticut
- County: Fairfield County
- City: Stamford

Area
  - Total: 1.7 sq mi (4.4 km^{2})

Population
  - Estimate (2007): 15,400

Glenbrook is a neighborhood of the city of Stamford, Connecticut. Spanning an area of about 1.7 square miles (4.4 km^{2}), about 15,400 people live in Glenbrook as of 2007. Glenbrook is located on the eastern side of the city, east of Downtown, north of the East Side and the Cove sections and south of the Springdale section. To the west is Downtown Stamford and to the northwest is Belltown. To the east is Darien.

Glenbrook's income levels are roughly in line with Stamford's as a whole, and single-family homes are prominent, making up 65% of Glenbrook's housing stock according to a 2007 New York Times article, although condos and co-ops make up about another 25%. The neighborhood's residential architecture prominently features a number of late 19th century and early 20th century architectural styles, such as Greek revival, Craftsman, Colonial Revival, Queen Anne style, Cape Cod, Victorians, and ranches. Some public housing developments are in the southern end of the neighborhood.

There are several retail sections, including the Glenbrook Center shopping plaza, as well as an industrial park. The neighborhood also has several churches. The Julia A. Stark School and Dolan Middle School, both part of Stamford Public Schools, are in Glenbrook.

Glenbrook retains a distinct identity, as "many residents see themselves as living not in a bustling city, but in a separate small town", according to a New York Times article about the community.

== History ==
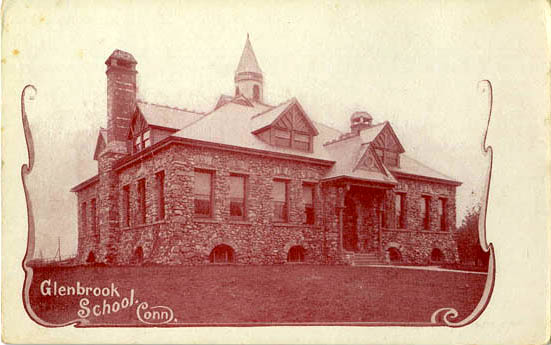
Glenbrook Community Center (formerly Glenbrook School, from a pre-1907 postcard)

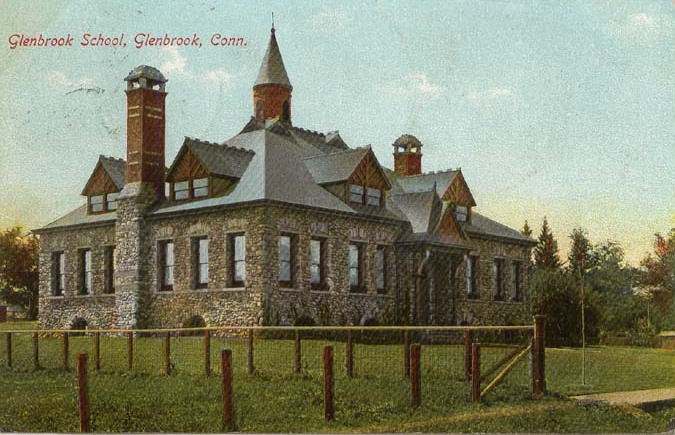
Another view of the Glenbrook School (1911 postcard)

In 1856, English pharmacist Charles Henry Phillips, best known for his invention of milk of magnesia, built a wax and camphor factory in present-day Glenbrook, along the banks of the Noroton River. The factory, located at 666 Glenbrook Road, would be sold to Sterling Drug, remain operational until 1975 or 1976.

The initial ascent of modern-day Glenbrook began in 1866, when the construction of a railroad from Stamford's town center to nearby New Canaan fueled minor land speculation. In October 1866, J.M.B. Whitton, a Philadelphia resident, purchased a 19-acre (7.7 ha) tract of land in the area, which was then known as New Hope, to divide into plots to resell to prospective residents. This land included the old Dixon Homestead. The New Canaan railroad was built five years later, passing through the center of Whitton's land. Whitton laid out streets, including Cottage Avenue, Union Street, and Railroad Avenue. In the years following Whitton's original 1866 purchase, a number of other businessmen purchase large tracts of land in the area to divide into individual residential plots.

In the 1870s, New Hope residents began increasingly referring to the area as "Glen-Brook" or "Glenbrook". By 1874, the area began being officially referred to as "Glenbrook" in official land deeds.

Former U.S. President and Civil War General Ulysses S. Grant sometimes visited Glenbrook after he left the White House in 1877. He often visited to play poker with Ferdinand Ward, a business partner of his who owned a home at Strawberry Hill Avenue and Holbrook Drive. When Grant found out that Ward was cheating clients, he stopped visiting. The firm failed in 1884 and Grant went bankrupt. The gatehouse of Ward's estate remains, but the other buildings are gone.

By the 1880s, the area began seeing non-residential uses, such as schoolhouses and churches.

In 1892, the fast-growing city of Stamford proposed a new city government which would include Glenbrook within its boundaries. Some residents were strongly opposed to this, and hired an attorney to prevent the annexation into Stamford.

Until the 1960s Stamford's now large neighborhoods, like Glenbrook, were often looked on as individual, unofficial towns, and residents would write their mailing addresses using the name "Glenbrook, Conn." instead of "Stamford, Conn."

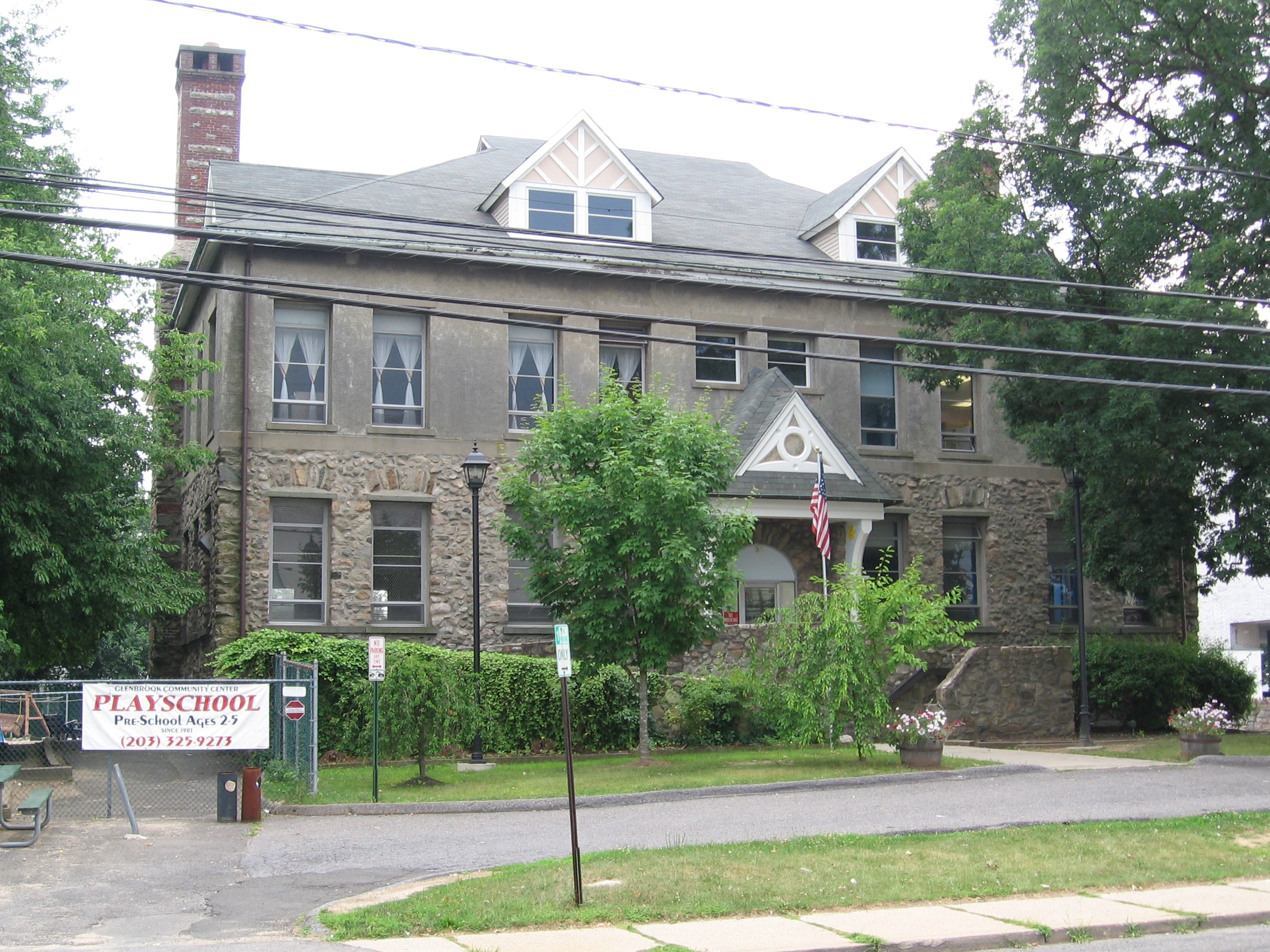
The Glenbrook Community Center building, 2007

In the 1950s, the train station was moved from a spot near the Courtland Avenue overpass (on the New Haven Line) to its present location a bit to the northwest on the New Canaan Branch. In the 2000s, city officials considered building a second train station in the area, possibly at the original Glenbrook station site.

Prior to 2020, the neighborhood was served by the Glenbrook Community Center, a local community center. In 2022, Mayor Caroline Simmons proposed converting the disused building into affordable housing, although the plan was ultimately scrapped. As of November 2022, the building remains vacant.

== Boundaries of the neighborhood ==
As a neighborhood with no formal administrative status, Glenbrook has no formal boundaries, and often overlaps with of nearby neighborhoods. The Stamford city government lumps Glenbrook in with the adjacent neighborhood of Belltown in its neighborhood statistical areas.

An article about Glenbrook in The New York Times Real Estate section in 2007 provided a map showing these boundaries of the community: the eastern boundary runs along the Noroton River (the boundary with Darien), southwest to Hamilton Avenue, then north on Glenbrook Road, west on Arlington Road, north on Underhill Street, west on Hillside Road, north on Strawberry Hill Avenue, east on Pine Hill Avenue; north on Elmbrook Drive (perhaps on both sides of that street), then north on both sides of Deleo Drive, southeast on Toms Road, north on Hope Street and then on Viaduct Road to the Darien border.

Closer to Interstate 95, some residents consider themselves in the East Side neighborhood.

== Demographics ==
Glenbrook has a number of prominent ethnic European-American communities. The neighborhood has a large population of Italian Americans, Irish-Americans, German Americans, Polish Americans, and Ukrainian Americans. Glenbrook also has a sizable Hispanic community, mirroring Stamford as a whole.

Economically, Glenbrook experiences an income level roughly in line with that of Stamford as a whole. A 2019 publication by the city government reported that the "Glenbrook-Belltown" neighborhood had a per capita income of $47,661, slightly below Stamford's total, but above Connecticut's. The Census Bureau's 2021 5-year American Community Survey estimated that the 06906 ZIP Code, which encompasses much of Glenbrook, had a median household income of $95,341, slightly below Stamford's total of $99,791.

== Government ==
The Stamford Fire Department's Fire Station #6, as well as the New Hope (Glenbrook) Fire Company, serve the neighborhood. Glenbrook has its own post office, located on Hope Street. Stamford High School is located on the western edge of Glenbrook.

== Culture ==
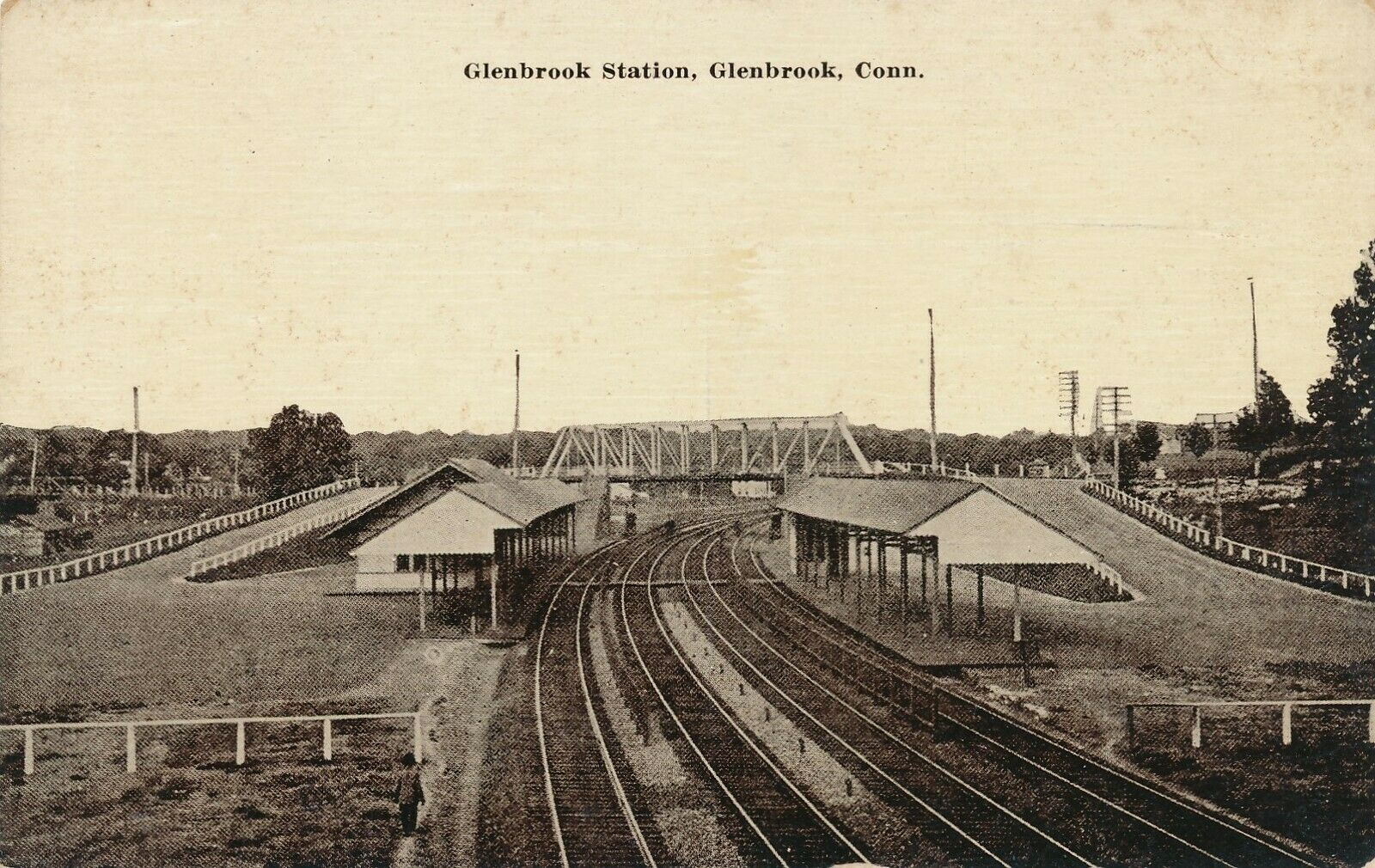
Railroad station, from a 1912 postcard

Since 2000, the Glenbrook Neighborhood Association has held an annual block party popular in the neighborhood. The association raised money in 2006 for a small park on Hope Street.

Glenbrook serves as a focal point for Stamford's Ukrainian American community. St Vladimir's Cathedral on Wenzel Terrace is the headquarters for the Ukrainian Catholic Eparchy of Stamford, a diocese of Ukrainian Rite Roman Catholics that extends across New England and New York state. The neighborhood is also home to a School of Ukrainian Studies and the Ukrainian Museum and Library of Stamford.

AmeriCares, an international charity, has its headquarters in the neighborhood.

United House Wrecking was a notable furniture store in Glenbrook prior to its 2021 closing. A 1989 New York Times article described the store as "a bizarre emporium of kitsch containing acres of architectural remnants, brick, used plumbing fixtures, antiques, garden statuary and some outrageous items of decor".

== Transportation ==
Glenbrook is located off of Interstate 95, and has its own exit (Exit 9).

The neighborhood is home to Glenbrook station, along the New Canaan Branch off the New Haven Line.

== In popular culture ==
Night Scene from College Road Trip being filmed in Glenbrook, August 2007

In August 2007, scenes for College Road Trip, a Disney film released in 2008, were shot on location in one of the Queen Anne style homes of Glenbrook.

== See also ==
- East Side
- Springdale
- Stamford
- Taylor-Reed Corporation
