= East Side of Stamford =

Area of Stamford in Connecticut, US

East Side
- Neighborhood
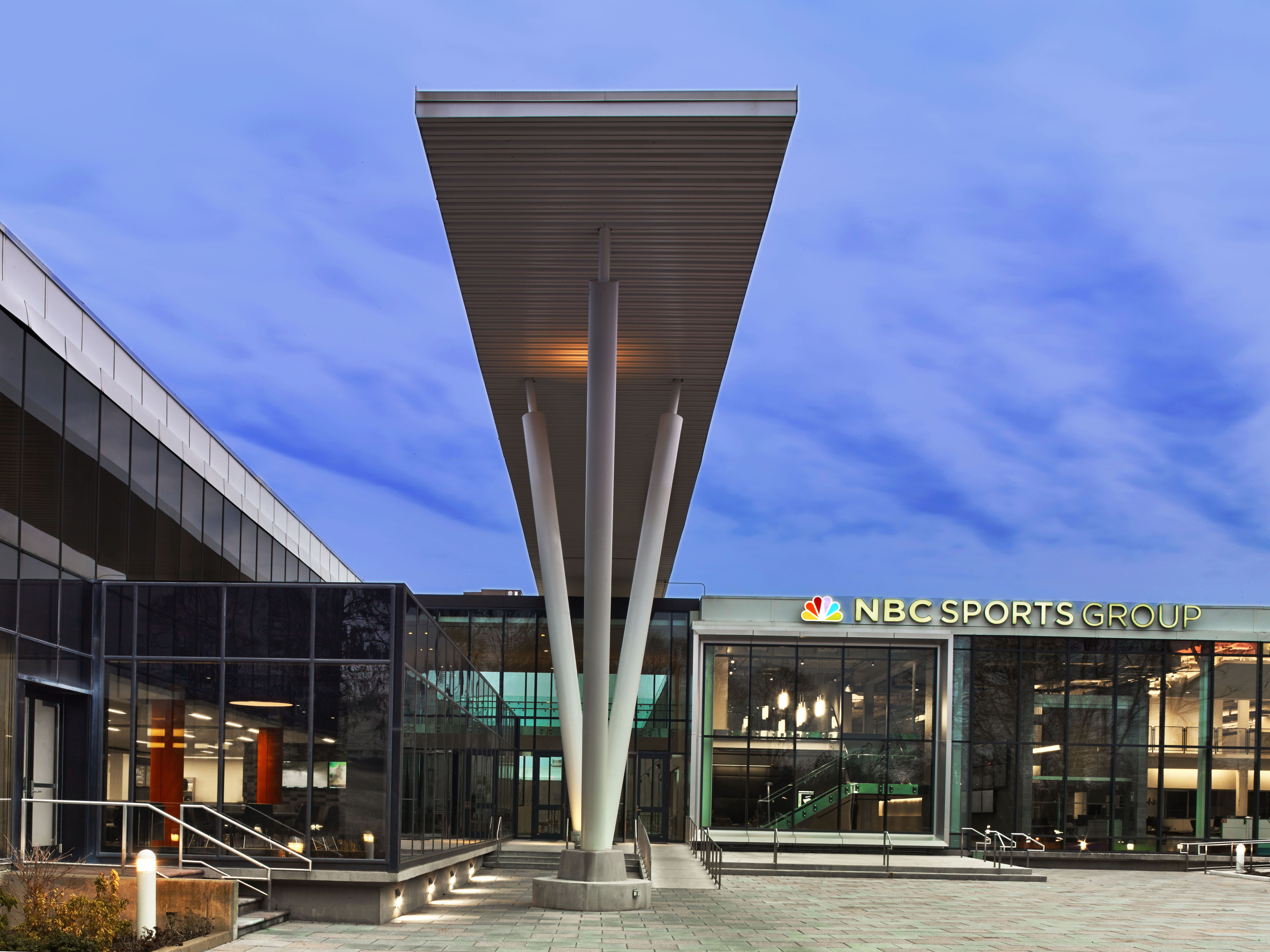
- The headquarters of NBC Sports

- Location within Connecticut
- Coordinates: 41.0561°N 73.5213°W

Area
  - Total: 2.2 km^{2} (0.84 sq mi)

Population (2015-2019)
  - Total: 8,181
  - Density: 3,800/km^{2} (9,700/sq mi)

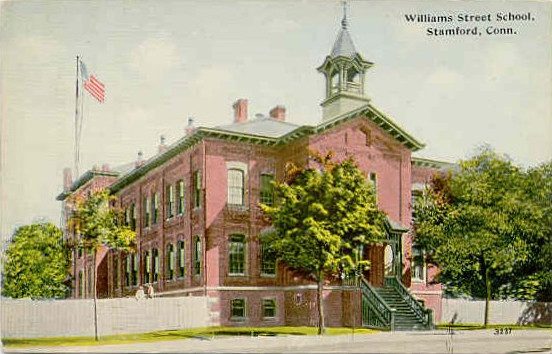
William Street School, about 1913

The East Side of Stamford is a neighborhood in the city of Stamford, Connecticut. Per the city government's definition, the East Side lies directly to the East of Downtown, southeast of Glenbrook, north of The Cove, and to the west of Darien. The East Side serves as the headquarters for a number of corporations, such as World Wrestling Entertainment and NBC Sports, and hosts corporate offices for a number of large multinationals, such as that of Deloitte at 695 East Main Street. A branch of the Hospital for Special Surgery is located in the East Side, on Blachley Road. Interstate 95 runs through the neighborhood, as does a segment of the Post Road.

== History ==
Little more than 100 years ago there was, by comparison to today, almost no development between Elm Street and the Noroton River. However, the East Side – bounded by Glenbrook Road and Hamilton Avenue to the North; Cove Road to the South; Weed Avenue to the East; and Grove and Elm Streets to the West – are easily identifiable on turn of the century maps.

Prior to the construction of Interstate 95 in the 1960s, the Post Road (known locally as East Main Street, also now labeled as Route 1), which runs through the East Side, served as the most important roadway in Connecticut.

When the Stamford city government revised its master plan for development in 1999-2002 the East Side was considered together with the Cove as one neighborhood. The East Side Partnership was founded in 2002 to support community development. The organization is composed of area residents, business owners and community advisors with a common goal of representing the interests of the East Side and to improve the quality of life for residents, business owners, property owners, professionals and visitors.

From 2000 to 2005, population growth in the area a half mile around the intersection of East Main Street and Lockwood Avenue was almost 4 percent, nearly twice the growth rate of the rest of the city, according to a 2005 preliminary report by AMS Consulting of Bridgeport, a company working on a development plan for the area. The report found the neighborhood has strong potential for economic development, with high traffic counts and easy access to Interstate 95.

== Geography ==
The East Side lies directly to the east of Downtown Stamford, southeast of Glenbrook, north of The Cove, and to the West of the town of Darien.

== Demographics ==
Per the city government, the East Side had a population of 8,181 per a 2015-2019 estimate. The neighborhood's median age is 36.0, compared to 36.9 for the entirety of Stamford; 21.3% of the East Side's population is less than 18 years old, compared to 20.5% for Stamford; 12.9% of the East Side's population is 65 years old or older, compared to 14.4% for Stamford.

34.1% of the East Side is non-Hispanic white, 11.9% is non-Hispanic black, 4.8% is non-Hispanic Asian, 2.9% is non-Hispanic multiracial, and 46.2% is Hispanic.

The unemployment rate in the East Side is 5.9%, the per capita income is $34,946, 32.7%f residents age 25 and older have earned a bachelor's degree or higher, and 43.0% of households spend 30% or more of their income on housing.

15.0% of households self-identify as having limited English proficiency.

68.1% of workers drive alone to work.

== Economy ==
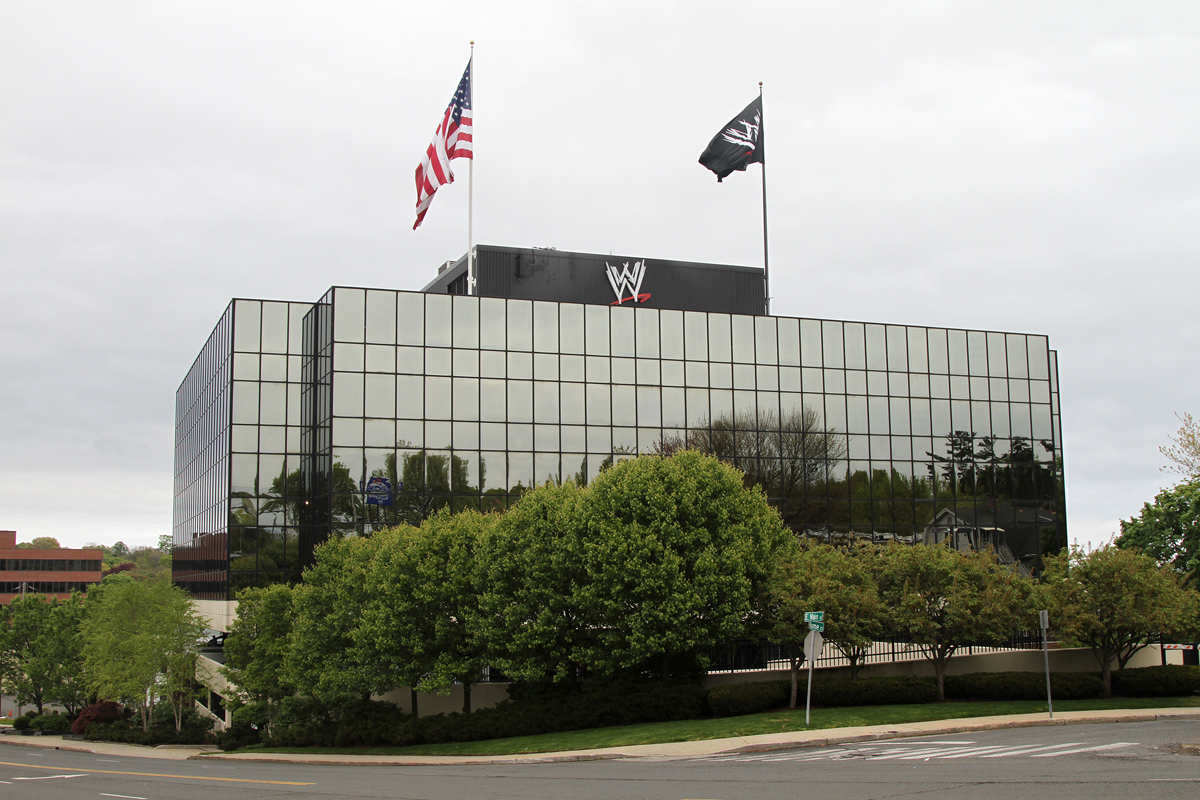
The headquarters of World Wrestling Entertainment

Major corporate entities headquartered in the East Side include World Wrestling Entertainment and NBC Sports. A regional office of Deloitte is located at 695 East Main Street. A branch of the Hospital for Special Surgery is located in the East Side, in a complex along on Blachley Road shared by NBC Sports and Chelsea Piers, a large local gym.

== Churches ==
The neighborhood has two Roman Catholic Churches — St. Mary (which has the largest capacity of any Roman Catholic Church in Fairfield County) and St. Benedict - Our Lady of Montserrat Parish.

== Emergency services ==
The Stamford Fire Rescue Department's Fire Station # 4 serves the neighborhood.

== Transportation ==
Interstate 95 bisects the East Side, running along an east-west axis. The Post Road (labelled locally as East Main Street, and Route 1) also runs through the neighborhood, parallel to Interstate 95.
