= Rayward–Shepherd House =

Rayward–Shepherd House (Tirranna)
- Location within Connecticut

General information
- Type: House
- Architectural style: Modern architecture; Usonian
- Location: New Canaan, Connecticut
- Coordinates: 41.134525°N 73.512400°W
- Completed: 1955

Design and construction
- Architect: Frank Lloyd Wright

The Rayward–Shepherd House, also known as Tirranna and as the John L. Rayward House, is a home in New Canaan, Connecticut originally built in 1955 to a design of renowned architect Frank Lloyd Wright. Commissioned by Joyce and John Rayward, the home was expanded to a design of Wright's successor firm, Taliesin Associated Architects by subsequent owner Herman R. Shepherd after his purchase in 1964.

== Description ==
"Tirranna" is an Aboriginal Australian word meaning "running waters," an apt name for a home located on a pond just off the Noroton River featuring elaborate land and water-scaping. The largely semicircular home is built of standard concrete block, timber, and glass, with poured Colorundum flooring and extensive Philippine mahogany trim. Its living/dining wing overlooks a pool which steps down to a pond and extensive landscaped gardens, designed by Frank Okamura, landscape architect for the Brooklyn Botanic Garden. Charles Middeleer, a notable local landscape architect, also contributed to the landscape design. The house originally featured a bomb shelter which has since been converted into a wine cellar.

The home includes a 1958 extension featuring an observatory above the master bedroom dressing room, as well as a playhouse for the Raywards' daughters, Victoria and Jennifer (1957), which echoes the semicircular form of the main house.

The property was purchased by Herman R. Shepherd in 1964. According to the writer William Allin Storrer Shepherd's actions repairing the "poor work" that Storrer attributes to John Rayward's "constant pursuit of the lowest bid" salvaged the house.(Storrer, 411)

Shepherd also engaged Wright's successor firm, Taliesin Associated Architects (TAA), to design a "major extension beyond the work room...." which "leads to a greenhouse with servant and guest quarters, shop and extra carport". Later work by TAA "brought about the enclosure of the space between original bedroom wing and added master bedroom wing, gaining an atrium and informal living room.... Even later, a circular deck was added above the main pool." (Storrer, 411) Shepherd also commissioned Taliesin to design a tree house for his 12-year-old son Benjamin. It was built in 1967 and was the only known Taliesin designed tree house.

The home was purchased in the late 1990s by businessman Ted Stanley and his wife Vada. After Stanley's death, the 15-acre property was put on the market in January 2017 for US$8,000,000 by his heirs. The house sold in March 2018 for a reported US$4.8 million.

It was again put on the market for US$8 million in 2023 and was sold for US$6 million in January 2024.

== See also ==
- List of Frank Lloyd Wright works
