= Richard H. Goodwin =

American botanist and conservationist (1910–2007)

Richard Hale Goodwin (December 14, 1910 – July 6, 2007) was an American botanist and conservationist. He taught at the University of Rochester before joining the faculty at Connecticut College, where he was professor and director of the arboretum. He was a founding member of The Nature Conservancy and served twice as its president.

== Early life ==
Richard "Dick" Goodwin was born on December 14, 1910, in Brookline, Massachusetts, to Harry and Mary Goodwin. He entered Harvard University in 1929 and received his undergraduate degree in biology in 1933. He went on to receive a master's and doctorate degree from Harvard with a concentration in botany. His graduate research focused on the role of plant hormones in the leaf development of goldenrods. At Harvard, he studied under Ralph Wetmore, Merritt Lyndon Fernald, Kenneth Thiman, Irving Bailey, and E. C. Jeffrey. He married Esther Bemis in 1936 and they traveled together to East Africa and the Belgian Congo in 1937 after he received his degree.

== Career ==
From 1937 to 1938, Goodwin was a Fellow of the American-Scandinavian Foundation and a guest investigator in the plant physiology laboratory at the University of Copenhagen, researching plant growth hormones.

When Goodwin returned to the United States in 1938, he joined the faculty of the University of Rochester as an instructor in botany. In addition to teaching and research, Goodwin managed the university herbarium for six years.

Goodwin joined Connecticut College in 1944 as a professor of botany and director of the Connecticut College Arboretum, replacing George Avery. As Director of the Arboretum, Goodwin spearheaded the acquisition of land that grew the Arboretum from 90 to 420 acres by 1975. Goodwin hired William Niering in 1953 to teach in the botany department and to supervise ecological research in the Arboretum. In 1969, Goodwin helped create an early Environmental Studies program known as Human Ecology. This program, one of the first of its kind at an undergraduate level in the nation, brought together the study of science and public policy. He headed this interdepartmental major from 1969-1976. Goodwin was awarded the Connecticut College Medal in 1984 and in 1999, the Center for Conservation Biology and Environmental Studies at Connecticut College was renamed the Goodwin-Niering Center for the Environment to honor his work.

Goodwin died on July 6, 2007, in East Lyme, Connecticut, at the age of 96.

== Nature Conservancy ==
Goodwin was a founding member of the Nature Conservancy. He held the position of president twice from 1956 to 1958 and again from 1964 to 1966.
