= Jiffy Pop =

Popcorn brand

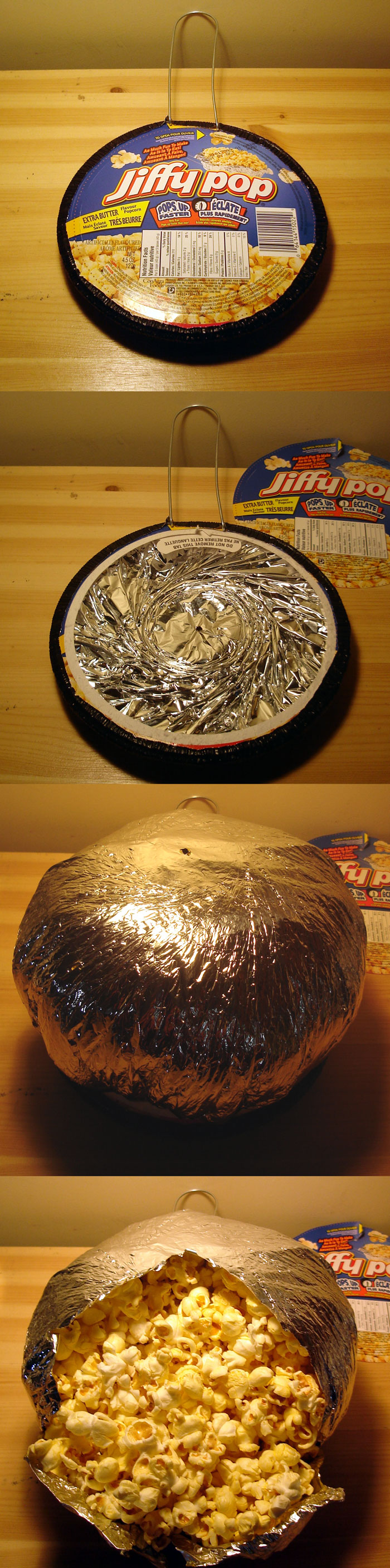
Jiffy Pop Popcorn. Top to bottom: uncooked with paper outer covering in place, uncooked with foil inner covering exposed, cooked with foil intact, cooked with foil opened.

Jiffy Pop is a popcorn brand owned by Conagra Brands. The product consists of popcorn kernels, oil, and flavoring agents contained within a foil-covered, disposable aluminum pan. Once the paper outer covering is removed, the pan is held by an attached handle over a heat source such as a stove burner or campfire and gently agitated, causing the kernels to pop and push outward against the foil. The pan is then removed from the heat, the foil is torn open, and the popcorn is served.

Jiffy Pop is one of the few brands that continues to sell popcorn in pre-packaged pans ready for cooking.

== History ==
Frederick C. Mennen of LaPorte, Indiana, a chemist, inventor and industrialist, is credited with developing the product in 1958. Mennen began marketing Jiffy Pop in 1959.

American Home Products purchased Jiffy Pop from Mennen that same year. There, Alvin Golub, a pharmacologist, perfected the product, and within one year it reached the national U.S. market. In 1976, the stage magician Harry Blackstone Jr. was endorsing what the television-commercial jingle called "the magic treat — as much fun to make as it is to eat".

Jiffy Pop was based on a similar product designed five years before by Benjamin Coleman of Berkley, Michigan, and marketed by the Taylor-Reed Corporation as E-Z Pop. In the early 1960s, Taylor-Reed sued Mennen Food Products for patent infringement. The district court ruled for the plaintiff, finding Jiffy Pop and E-Z Pop equivalent products, but the case was overturned on appeal.

American Home Products spun off its food division, and renamed it International Home Foods, in 1996. In 2000, ConAgra purchased International Home Foods.

Original Jiffy Pop packages used a plain, bright aluminum pan. This was eventually replaced by an aluminum pan with a black treatment on the outside to improve heat transfer. Also, although at one time a "Natural" flavor and a Jiffy Pop Microwave Popcorn version was manufactured, Jiffy Pop is today offered in only one stovetop version, Butter Flavor Popcorn.

== Advertising ==
Jiffy Pop has run television commercials dating back at least to 1967. In one commercial, a genie appears and gives two children Jiffy Pop to eat. The slogan was repeated several times to highlight the fact that Jiffy Pop is "as much fun to make as it is to eat".

== In popular culture ==
It is featured in the opening iconic scene featuring Drew Barrymore of 1996 American satirical horror film Scream and its parody Scary Movie featuring Drew Barrymore and Carmen Electra respectively.

== See also ==
- List of popcorn brands
