= Connecticut College Arboretum =

Arboretum and botanical gardens in Connecticut, US

Coordinates: 41.38°N 72.11°W

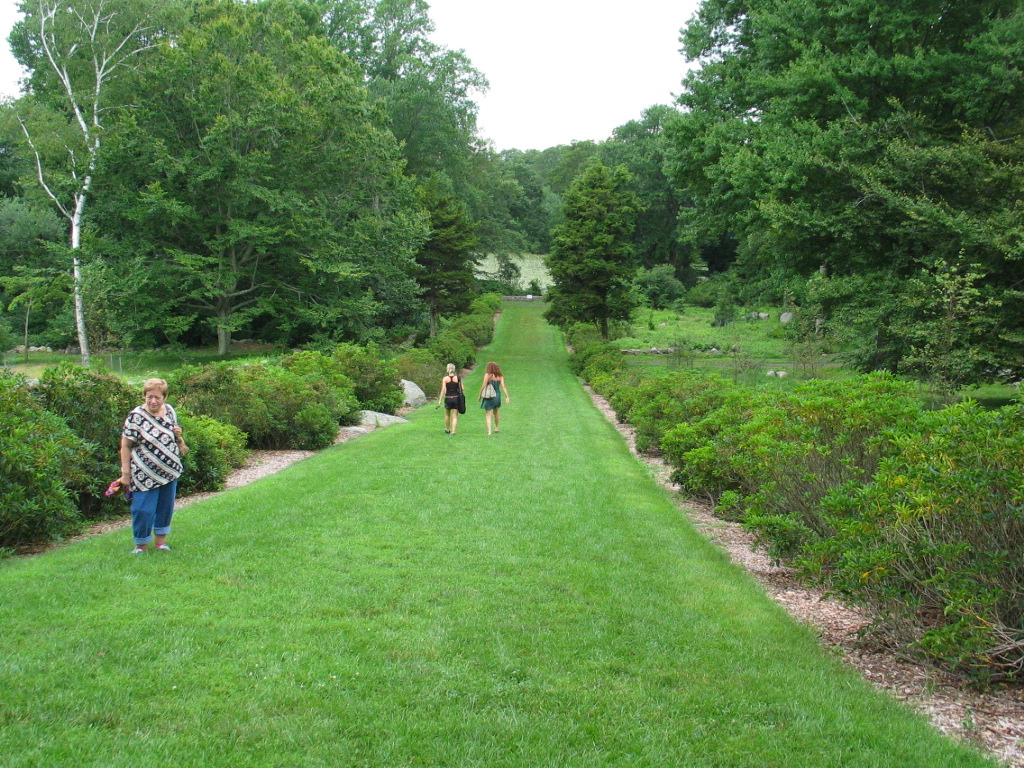
- The "grass ramp" from the entrance to the lily pond.
- Interactive map of Connecticut College Arboretum
- Website: www.conncoll.edu/the-arboretum

The Connecticut College Arboretum is a 300 ha (750 acres) arboretum and botanical gardens, founded in 1931, and located on the campus of Connecticut College and in the towns of New London and Waterford, Connecticut, United States.

== Collections ==
Arboretum collections are: the Native Plant Collection, the Caroline Black Garden, the Connecticut College Campus, and the Greenhouse. The underlying bedrock of granite, schist and gneiss was scoured by glaciers about 26,000 years ago. The resulting glacial till has produced a brown soil of stony fine sandy loam texture. The dominant soil association on well-drained hills is Charlton-Chatfield complex. Hollis series occurs where the soil is less than 50 cm thick. A localized silt deposit in the southern area is mapped as Narragansett series. Poorly drained soils include Ridgebury, Leicester and peaty Timakwa series.

The Native Plant Collection of 8 ha (20 acres) was established in 1931, and displays trees and shrubs native to eastern North America and hardy in New London. It contains 288 taxa, including trees, shrubs, and woody vines indigenous to the forested region of Eastern North America, such as shadbush, dogwood, azaleas, mountain laurel, giant rhododendron, sourwood, sweet pepperbush, and evergreens and conifers. Of particular interest are:

- The Lincoln and Lillian Dauby Gries Conifer Collection (est. 1988), featuring 1.2 ha (3 acres) of conifers: firs, spruces, hemlocks, junipers, pines, etc., and a variety of native shrubs.
- The Nancy Moss Fine Native Azalea Garden (est. 1978), featuring 15 species and natural hybrid Azaleas (Rhododendron spp.).
- The Josephine Hooker Shain Mountain Laurel Garden (est. 1985), featuring cultivars of mountain laurel (Kalmia latifolia), many of which are the work of Dr. Richard Jaynes.
- The Edgerton and Stengel Wildflower Garden (est. 1956), featuring 0.8 ha (2 acres) of ferns and wildflowers such as trillium (Trillium spp.), cardinal flower (Lobelia cardinalis), and Turtlehead (Chelone spp.). The garden is named for state representative Edna Edgerton and arboretum horticulturist John Stengel.

The Caroline Black Garden contains a mature collection of ornamental trees, shrubs, and grasses from across the world, including 187 different woody taxa such as azaleas, Crimson Queen Japanese maple, sourwood (Oxydendrum arboreum), Japanese stewartia, fragrant viburnum, weeping cherry, and many other specimens.

The Connecticut College Campus currently has 223 taxa of trees and numerous shrubs, including the Franklin tree, Japanese Pagoda Tree, seven-son flower, and Chinese witch-hazel.

The 280 m^{2} (3,000 square foot) Greenhouse includes a tropical house, a cactus collection, and an experimentation area.

The College Arboretum is also host to the biannual Arbo-Fest. Local and student bands can be found performing next to the lilly pond for the college students. Arbo-Fest is held once in the fall and once in the spring.

== Directors ==
- George S. Avery (1931–1944)
- Richard H. Goodwin (1944–1965, 1968–1969)
- William Niering (1965–1968, 1969–1988)
- Glenn Dreyer (1988 – June 2018)
- Maggie Redfern (Interim Director, June 2018 to present)

== Gallery ==
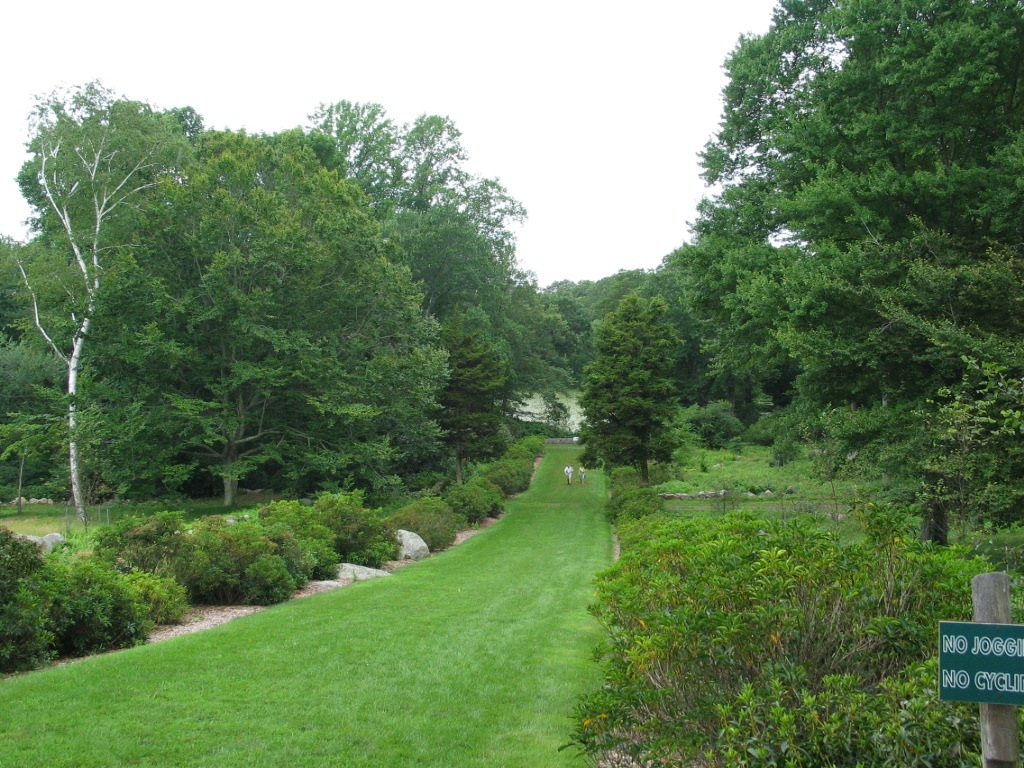
The entrance to the arboretum.

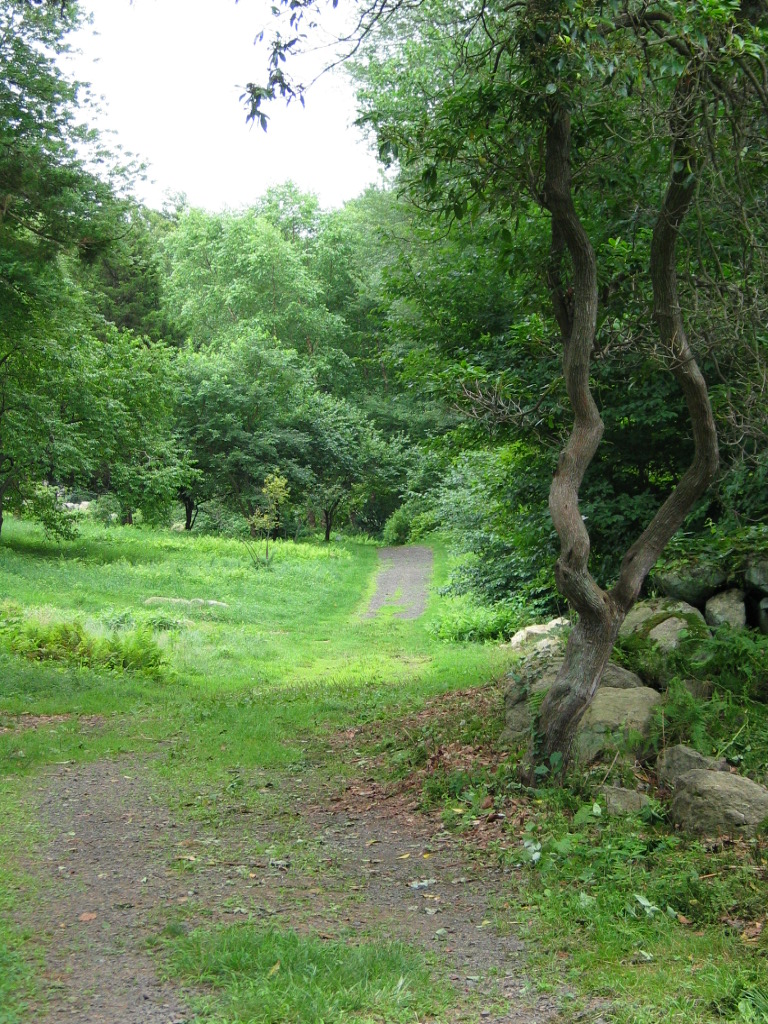
Among the green paths of the arboretum.

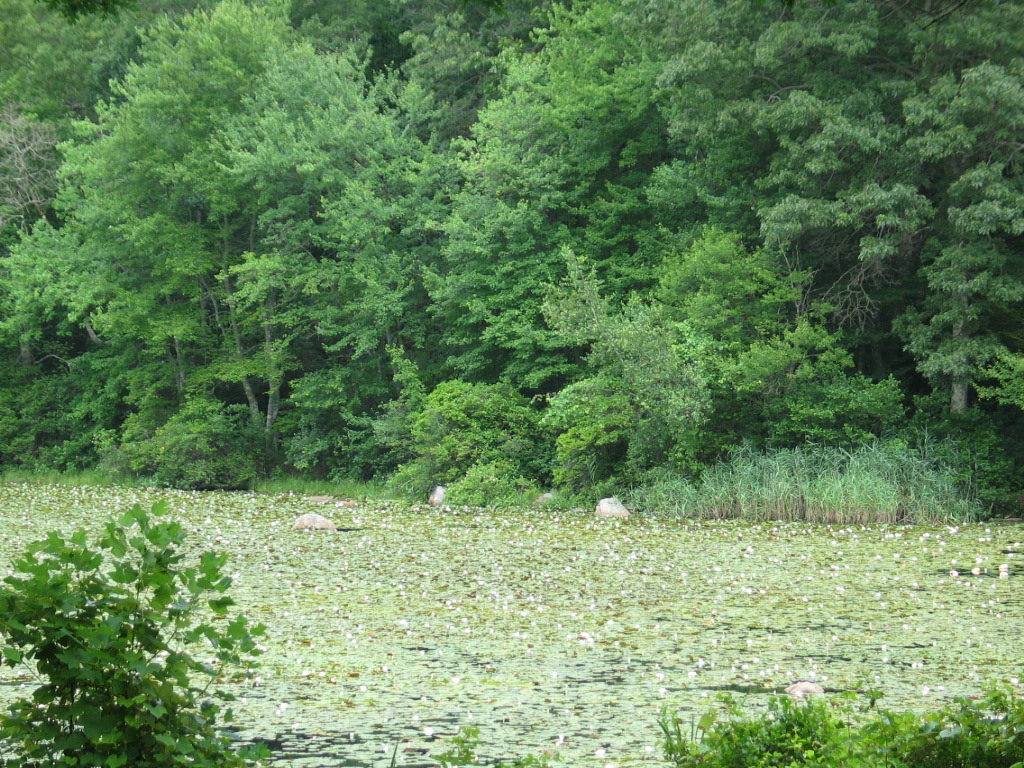
The lily pond surrounded by grass.

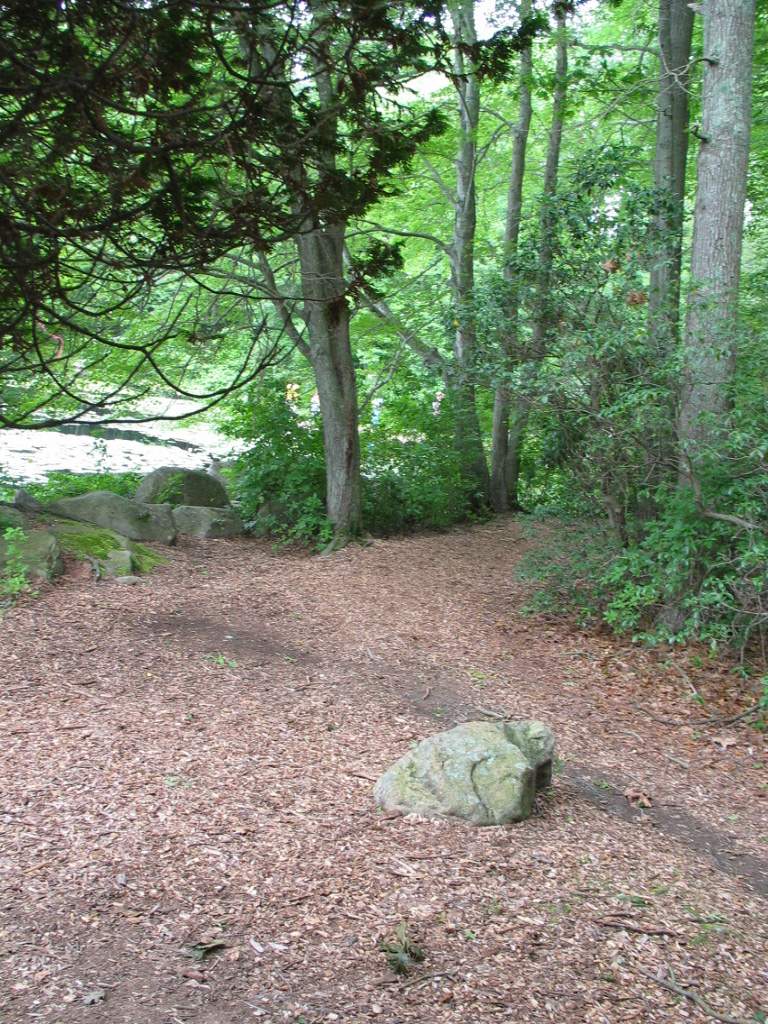
Another green corner of the arboretum.

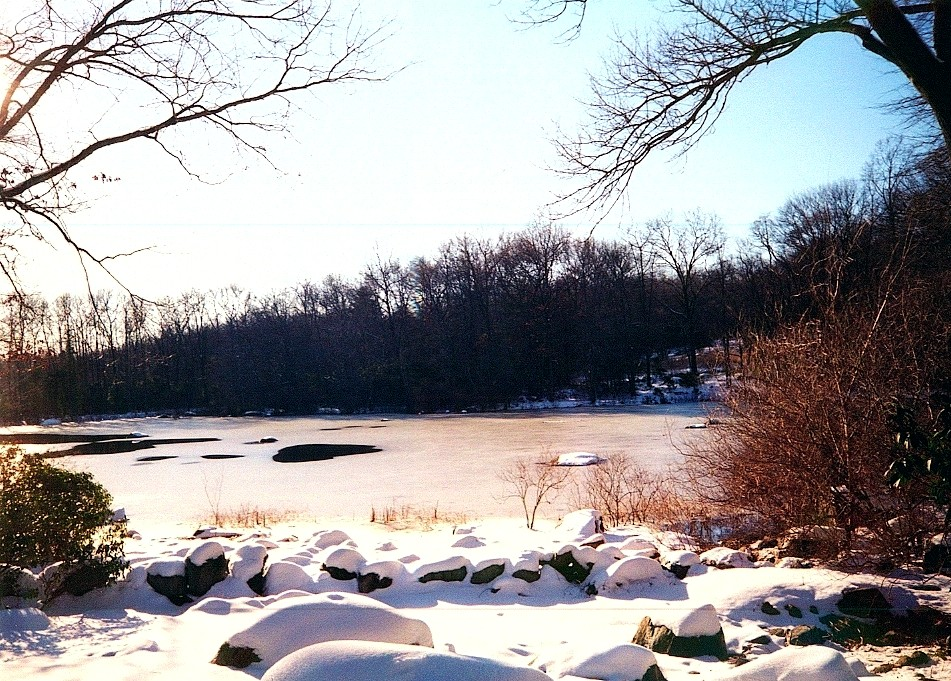
The arboretum lake in winter.

== See also ==
- List of botanical gardens in the United States
- Quaker Hill, Connecticut
