= James Murray (physician) =

Irish physician

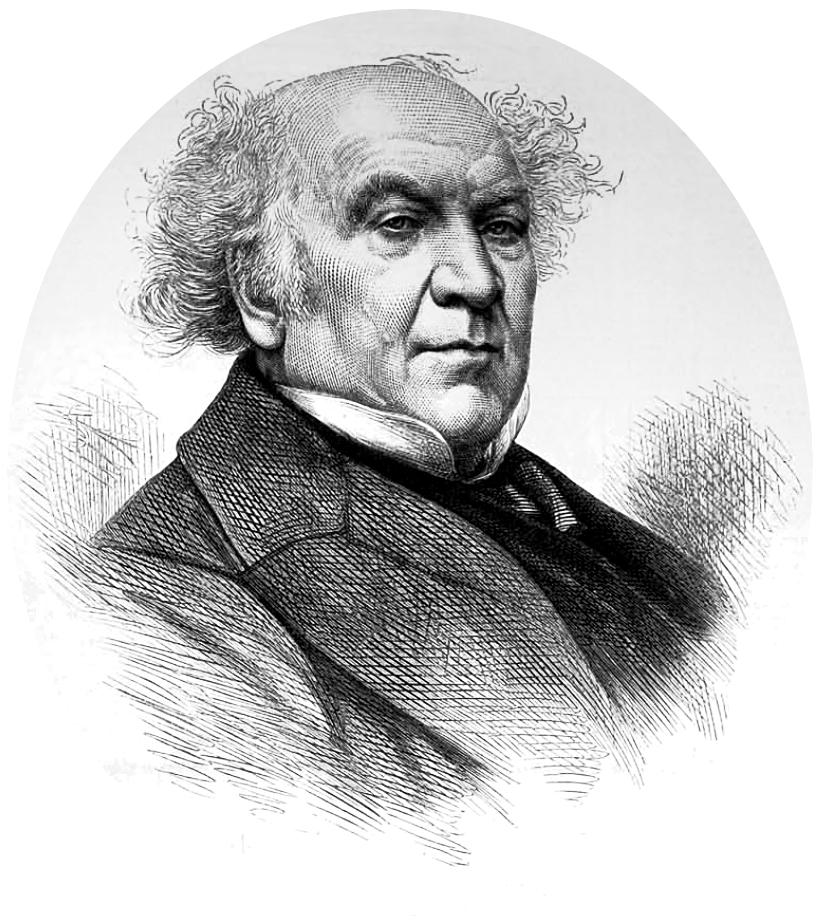
Sir James Murray

Sir James Murray (1788–1871) was an Irish physician, whose research into digestion led to his discovery of the stomach aid Milk of Magnesia in 1809. He later studied in electrotherapy and led the research into the causes of cholera and other epidemics as a result of exposure to natural electricity. He was the first physician to recommend the breathing in of iodine in water vapour for respiratory diseases.

Born in Derry, Murray became a licentiate in midwifery having studied at the Edinburgh College of Surgeons in 1807. He undertook studies in pharmaceuticals, an area in which he became competent. In 1809 he developed the foundations of fluid magnesia, which contained a base ingredient of magnesium sulfate. He modified it for it to act as an aid for "weak nerves", low fever, spasms, cholera, and diarrhoea. He named his recipe Fluid Magnesia, and set up the company Sir James Murray & Son to successfully market it.

Murray graduated from the University of Edinburgh as a Doctor of Medicine in 1829, and became the resident physician to Henry Paget, 1st Marquess of Anglesey, in 1831, a post Murray held until the 1840s. Murray was knighted in 1833 and received an honorary degree in medicine from Dublin University the following year. He was appointed as an inspector of anatomical schools in Ireland, and was a member of the central board of health, as well as the resident physician to the Netterville Dispensary and the Anglesey Lying-In Hospital, Dublin.

Murray died at his home in Dublin on 8 December 1871. He is the great-grandfather of the English actor Michael Hordern.

== Biography ==
=== Early life and education ===
Murray was born in Derry to Edward Murray and his wife, Belinda née Powell. James attended the Edinburgh College of Surgeons where he became a licentiate in midwifery in 1807. There, and after hearing lectures by the English chemist, physicist, and meteorologist, John Dalton, Murray undertook studies to establish the "exact proportions of heat, or electricity, naturally belonging to ... living atoms, in a state of health". After receiving his qualification, Murray was appointed the resident medical officer at a hospital in Belfast. His career flourished under the hospital's patron, George Chichester, 3rd Marquess of Donegall, who owned Belfast Castle.

=== Milk of Magnesia ===
In around 1809 Murray developed the foundations of fluid magnesia, which was widely promoted as a stomach aid. Its base ingredient, Magnesium sulfate, had long been known for its benefits in digestion and as an aid for constipation. Murray named his recipe Fluid Magnesia, and set up the company Sir James Murray & Son to successfully market it. Fluid Magnesia was later sold as a solution and recommended as a palatable laxative and as a remedy for acidity, indigestion, heartburn, and gout.

Along with this, Murray also developed a sweet-tasting mixture in the form of syrup which was designed to mix in with the fluid. This gave the mixture a pleasant aftertaste, which appealed to women and child patients. He also marketed Sir James Murray's Pure Fluid Camphor, a tonic which was used to aid weak nerves, low fever, spasms, cholera, and diarrhoea. Murray's innovations drew criticisms from contemporaries who thought that he had descended into commerce. Murray never patented his formula internationally, only protecting its rights in the British Empire and its colonies. This left him susceptible to imposters and he was forced to protect his business by litigation after his rights were infringed on several occasions. Because of its restriction to the British Empire, Murray's assistant, Dinnisford, became wealthy after he popularised the formula after Murray's death.

=== Superphosphate fertiliser ===
James Murray was also interested in the development of fertilizers for use in agriculture. Murray took out patents covering superphosphate fertiliser on 23 May 1842. On the same day John Bennet Lawes also took out a superphosphate patent. Murray was judged to have the priority patent as he had been working on superphosphate since 1808. Superphosphate is a soluble form of phosphate rock which makes phosphate available to plants.

=== Honours ===
Murray graduated as a Doctor of Medicine at the University of Edinburgh in 1829, and became the resident physician to the lord lieutenant of Ireland, Henry Paget, 1st Marquess of Anglesey, in 1831. Murray was knighted in 1833 by his employer, and received an honorary degree in medicine from Dublin University the following year. He was appointed as an inspector of anatomical schools in Ireland, and was a member of the central board of health.

=== Scandal ===
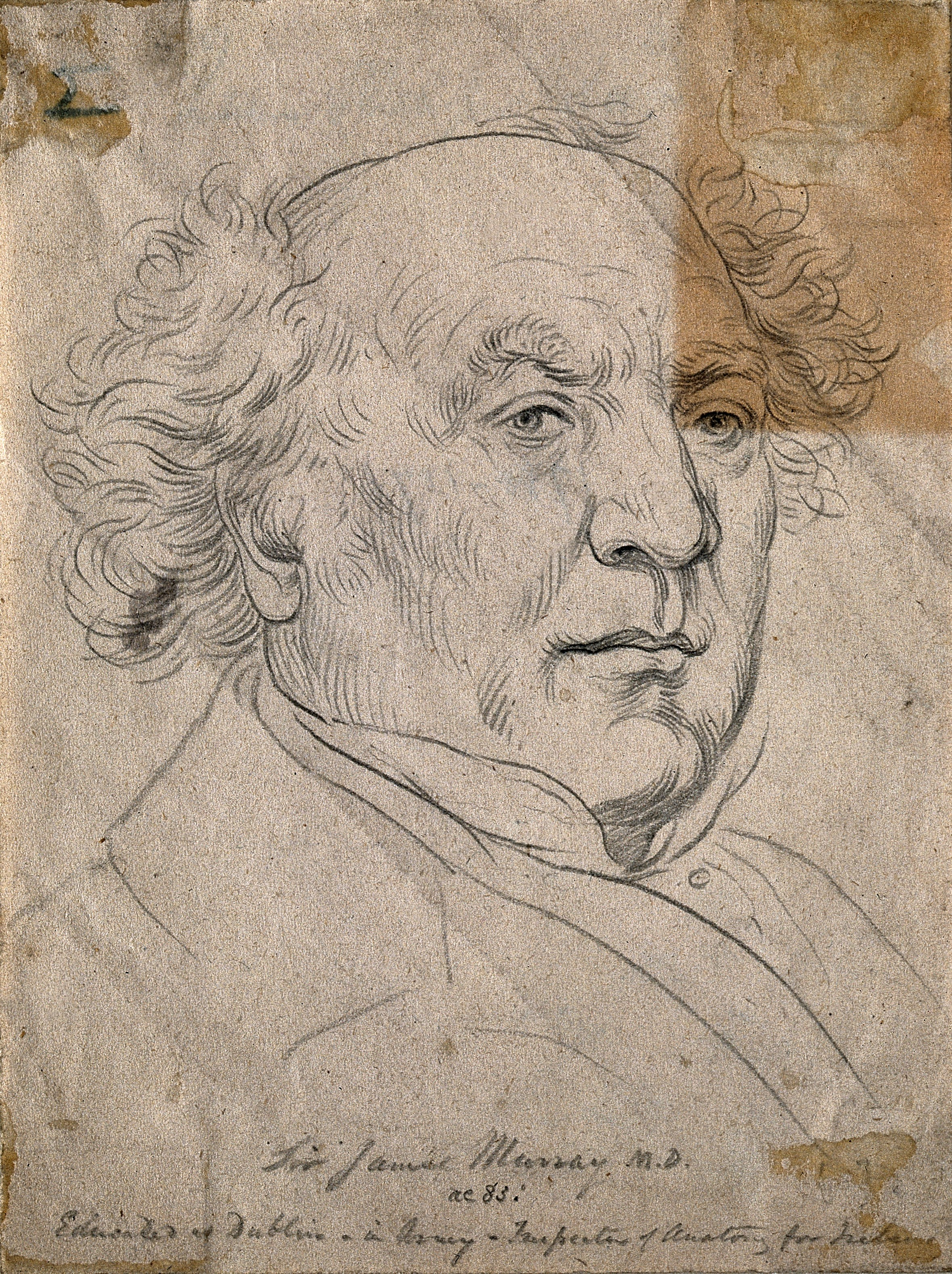
Pencil drawing from the Wellcome Collection

He travelled to Rome in 1844, where he undertook some studies into the causes of malaria. His research led to his view that the fever was caused by electro-galvanic currents and accumulations. He felt passionate towards his appointment as the resident physician to Anglesey, and subsequently to Anglesey's successors, George Phipps, 2nd Marquess of Normanby in 1835, and Viscount Ebrington in 1839. However, Murray's son, John, brought shame on his father by publishing a novel, entitled The Viceroy, which satirised "the worms and sycophants of Irish lord lieutenancy". The historian Richard Davenport-Hines, writing for the Dictionary of National Biography, noticed how the situation could have caused Murray much embarrassment and was probably the reason why, in 1841, the newly appointed Earl de Grey, George Robinson, 1st Marquess of Ripon, dispensed with Murray's services.

=== Studies in heat and electricity ===
Murray was the resident physician to the Netterville Dispensary and to the Anglesey Lying-In Hospital, Dublin. He was the first physician to recommend the breathing in of iodine in water vapour for respiratory diseases, and in 1829, he published his Dissertation on the influence of heat and humidity, with practical observations on the inhalation of iodine. This was reissued in 1837, with additions to his technique of tracheotomy operations.

His report analysed body temperatures in various diseases, and looked at the effects of heat and fluidity on medicines. It further suggested that dilution aided the effects of most medicines. However, it was the area of electrotherapy that Murray was most interested in; he (wrongly) attributed electricity to be the cause of cholera and other epidemics. He further opined that epidemics were a result of disturbances of natural electricity; either depletion or excess of electricity in the nervous system could derange the vital organs.

During the cholera epidemic of 1832, he lowered the atmospheric pressure on the external surface of sufferers' bodies using an air pump based on his own design. He also endorsed the medical use of atmospheric pressure in air baths. He reported his findings in various medical journals and publications.

=== Personal life ===
In 1809 Murray married Mary née Sharrock, with whom he had several children. When she died, he married again, this time to Mary née Allen in 1848; they had one daughter. Murray is the great-grandfather of the actor Michael Hordern. (Note: In his 1993 autobiography, A World Elsewhere, Hordern gives Sir James Murray as being his grandfather. The dates suggest otherwise; Hordern's actual grandfather was Edward Francis Murray (1818–1882) who was the son of Sir James and Mary Sharrock. In 1873 Edward fathered Margeret Emily Murray, Hordern's mother.)

Murray died at his home in Dublin on 8 December 1871 and was later buried at Glasnevin Cemetery, Dublin.

== Notes and references ==
Notes

== Sources ==
- Hordern, Michael (1993). A World Elsewhere. London: Michael O'Mara Books Ltd. ISBN 978-1-85479-188-7.
- Murray, James (2015). Electricity : As a Cause of Cholera, or Other Epidemics, and the Relation of Galvanism to the Action of Remedies. North Carolina: Forgotten Books. ISBN 978-133053-460-1.
- O'Donoghue, David James (1894). "Murray, James (1788-1871)" . In Lee, Sidney (ed.). Dictionary of National Biography. Vol. 39. London: Smith, Elder & Co.
