= Taylor-Reed Corporation =

- Industry: Food processing
- Founded: 1939
- Defunct: 1980
- Headquarters: Stamford, Connecticut; Mamaroneck, New York
- Products: Food

The Taylor-Reed Corporation was an American food manufacturer and packager that operated from 1939 to approximately 1977. It was founded by two Yale classmates (class of 1933), Malcolm P. Taylor (1911-2000) and Charles M. D. Reed (1911-2008), who had worked together on the campus humor magazine The Yale Record. Initially headquartered near Taylor's home in Mamaroneck, New York, the company soon moved operations a few miles away to Crescent Street in Glenbrook, Connecticut, a light-industrial and residential section of Stamford in Fairfield County, Connecticut.

Taylor-Reed specialized in a handful of consumer snack products, notably Cocoa Marsh which they called a "milk amplifier" or "milk booster" and E-Z Pop popcorn. It also manufactured Q-T Instant cake frosting and a variety of bulk institutional foods.

== Cocoa Marsh ==
During its early years, Taylor-Reed's main line of business was packaging sugar and chocolate rations for the War Department. In the postwar years, the company's best-known product was Cocoa Marsh chocolate syrup, which advertised heavily on children's programming in the New York City television market during the 1950s and 1960s. For many years the Taylor-Reed plant, with its Cocoa Marsh billboard ("Be strong as a lion!") was a familiar landmark by the Glenbrook station on the New Haven Railroad.

The company would on occasion issue jars of Cocoa Marsh with a toy surprise hidden in a double top. The regular metal jar cover had an additional white top cover approx. 3/4" tall attached with a white plastic strip. The toy surprise was located in this top cover. Other jars came with the pump cover - which could be re-used on a "refill" jar or the jar with the toy, also a re-fill jar.

After partners Taylor and Reed retired from day-to-day business (about 1970) the company gradually ceased operations as a food manufacturer and began to rent out and finally sell its premises. The factory's main driveway off Crescent Street is now officially designated Taylor Reed Place.

== E-Z Pop Patent Infringement Case ==
E-Z Pop commercial from the 1950s

In 1963 E-Z Pop figured in a landmark patent-infringement case, with Taylor-Reed as the plaintiff and Mennen Food Products, manufacturer of Jiffy Pop, as the defendant. Taylor-Reed had acquired the patent rights to E-Z Pop popcorn in 1954. The U.S. Court of Appeals, Seventh Circuit, struck down a lower-court ruling that Jiffy Pop's packaging, in particular its expanding-foil pouch, was equivalent to E-Z Pop's. The Appellate Court found that Jiffy Pop's aluminum foil was compressed in a spiral arrangement and this was a significant improvement on E-Z Pop's "button" compression.
