= The Cove, Stamford, Connecticut =

Neighborhood in Stamford, Connecticut, US

Coordinates: 41.0489°N 73.509°W

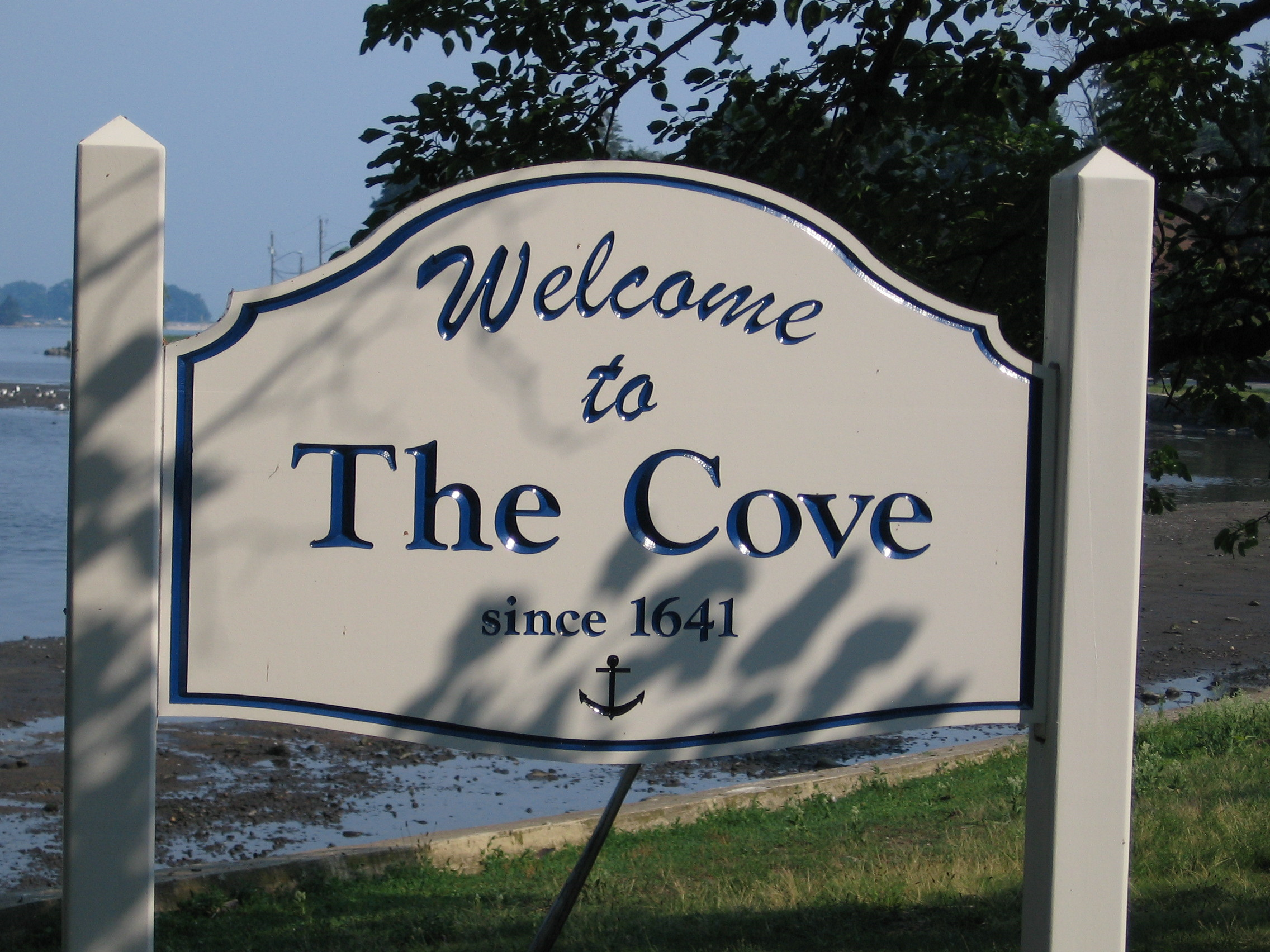
Welcome sign on Weed Avenue, just south of East Main Street ("Since 1641")

The Cove is a neighborhood in the southeast corner of Stamford, Connecticut. It is an area of mostly modest homes with some very expensive homes along the shore.

== History ==
The Cove area was one of the first sections of Stamford to be cleared and divided among settlers. The neighborhood, which then made up most of what was called East Fields, was apportioned to various settlers between 1641 and 1665.

Conservative author and journalist William F. Buckley Jr. was a decades-long resident at Wallack's Point, a small gated community on the shoreline. His son, the author and magazine editor Christopher Buckley, grew up there. Businessman and U.S. Representative Schuyler Merritt, for whom the Merritt Parkway is named, lived on an estate on Noroton Hill.

== Geography ==
There is no defined boundary between the Cove and neighboring sections of Stamford, although it does not extend farther north than East Main Street, while Glenbrook does not extend south of it. It is bordered by the East Side to the north and northeast and by Shippan to the south and southwest. Long Island Sound lies to the south.

The neighborhood is closely approximated by census tract 219, which is roughly bounded on the west by Seaside Avenue and the eastern edge of Cummings Park, and on the east by the Darien town line. The tract extends as far north as Interstate 95, but does not extend past Shippan Avenue north of Cove Road.

== Transportation ==
The neighborhood is atop and on the eastern and southern slopes of Noroton Hill, which also extends north across Interstate 95 and U.S. Route 1; the latter route, which runs along East Main Street (also known as the Boston Post Road) runs across the ridge, while Interstate 95 cuts across it.

The New Haven Line of the Metro-North Railroad was built around the north side of the Cove. The neighborhood is served by two stations, Stamford and Noroton Heights.
