= George S. Avery Jr. =

American horticulturalist (1903–1994)

- Born: August 3, 1903; Benton Harbor, Michigan
- Died: August 6, 1994 (aged 91); New London, Connecticut
- Education: Tulane University; Dartmouth College; University of Wisconsin
- Scientific career
- Fields: Plant physiology
- Workplaces: Brooklyn Botanic Garden; Connecticut College

George Sherman Avery Jr. (August 3, 1903 – August 6, 1994) was an American botanist, expert on plant physiology, and prominent horticulturalist.

== Biography ==
Avery obtained his undergraduate degree at Tulane University, and pursued his master's degree from Dartmouth College. He earned his Ph.D. in plant physiology from the University of Wisconsin.

In 1931, Avery was brought on as professor of botany at Connecticut College. He was also director of the Connecticut College Arboretum. Avery left Connecticut to head the Brooklyn Botanic Garden (BBG) in 1944. Under his direction, the BBG underwent several expansion projects as it acquired more land. In 1945, Avery established the Plants & Gardens journal.

While at the BBG, Avery took an interest in bonsai horticulture. In 1948, he hired Frank Okamura to help him take care of several bonsai housed at the garden, which were gifted by Ernest F. Coe in 1925. Avery began to work on a handbook for the care on bonsai with the help of horticulturalist Kanichiro Yashiroda, entitled Handbook on Dwarfed Potted Trees - The Bonsai of Japan. It was first published in 1953.

Avery served as president of the Botanical Society of America in 1957. He left the BBG in 1969.

== Awards ==
- American Horticultural Society's Professional Award (1970)
- Scott Arboretum's Arthur Hoyt Scott Medal and Award (1974)
