= Frank Okamura =

Japanese-born American horticulturist (1911-2006)

- Born: May 5, 1911; Hiroshima, Japan
- Died: January 9, 2006 (aged 94); Manhattan, New York
- Known for: Bonsai
- Scientific career
- Fields: Horticulture
- Workplaces: Brooklyn Botanic Garden

Frank Masao Okamura (May 5, 1911 – January 9, 2006) was a Japanese-born American horticulturalist who helped popularize the cultivation of bonsai in America.

== Biography ==
Born in Hiroshima, Okamura emigrated to California at the age of 13. He lost his small gardening business when in 1942, Okamura, his wife, and his two daughters were interned at Manzanar War Relocation Center as a result of Executive Order 9066. After the war, the Okamuras relocated to New York City. Okamura found work at the Brooklyn Botanic Garden in 1947. He was brought on to help restore the vandalized Japanese garden and to look after their ailing bonsai collection.

George Avery, also of the Brooklyn Botanic Garden, noticed an influx of bonsai trees returning from the war with American soldiers. He enlisted the help of Okamura to develop a lesson plan for the care of bonsai. Okamura began lecturing nationwide, teaching over 6,000 students over three decades. He was considered one of three major teachers of bonsai in America.

Under his direction, the bonsai collection of the Brooklyn Botanic Garden grew from 11 plants to over 1,000. He retired from the Garden in 1981.

His daughter, Mihoko, was the secretary of D. T. Suzuki.

== Awards ==
Okamura was awarded the Order of the Sacred Treasure with Silver Rays in 1981 by Emperor Hirohito.

== Gallery ==
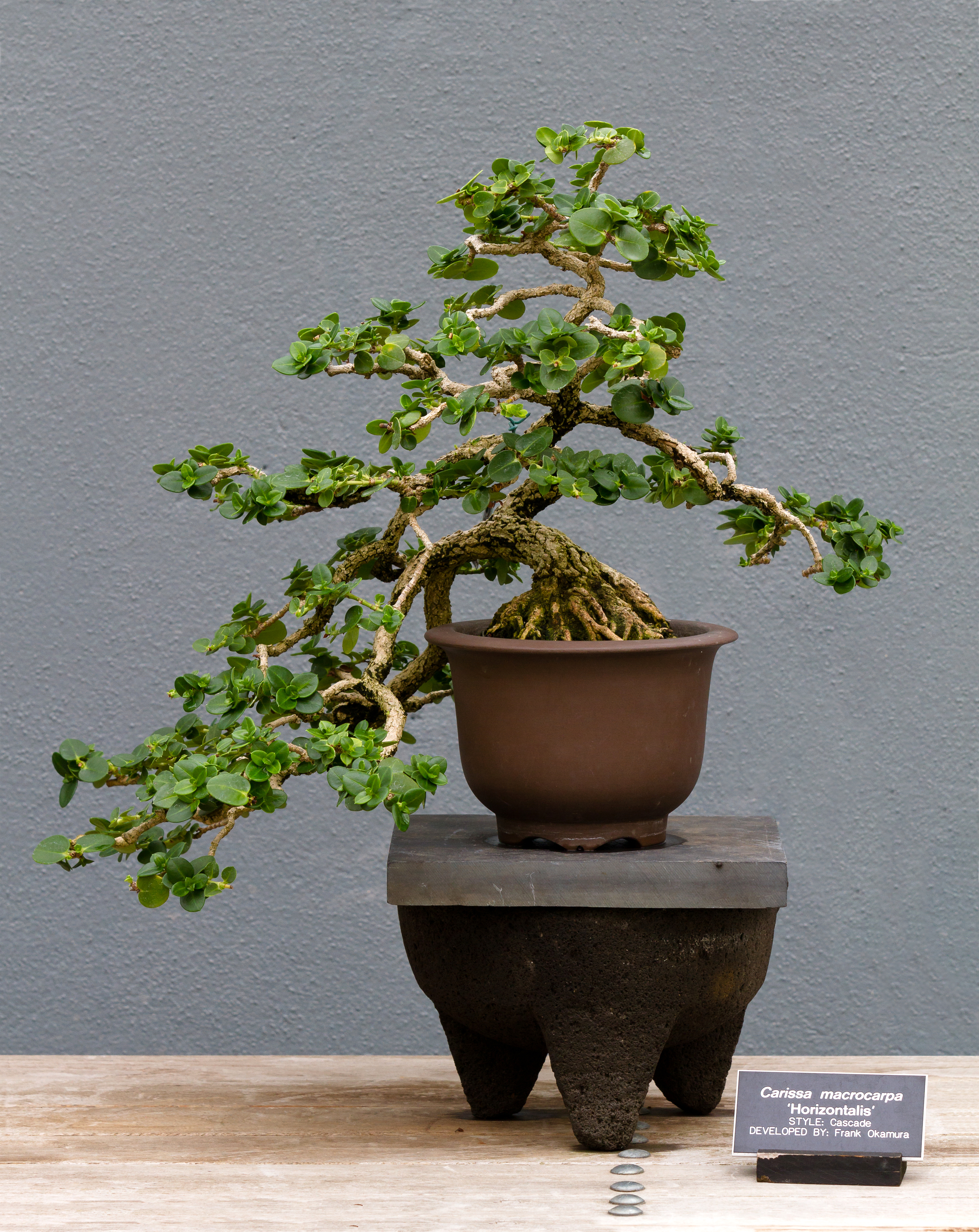
Carissa macrocarpa bonsai developed by Frank Okamura

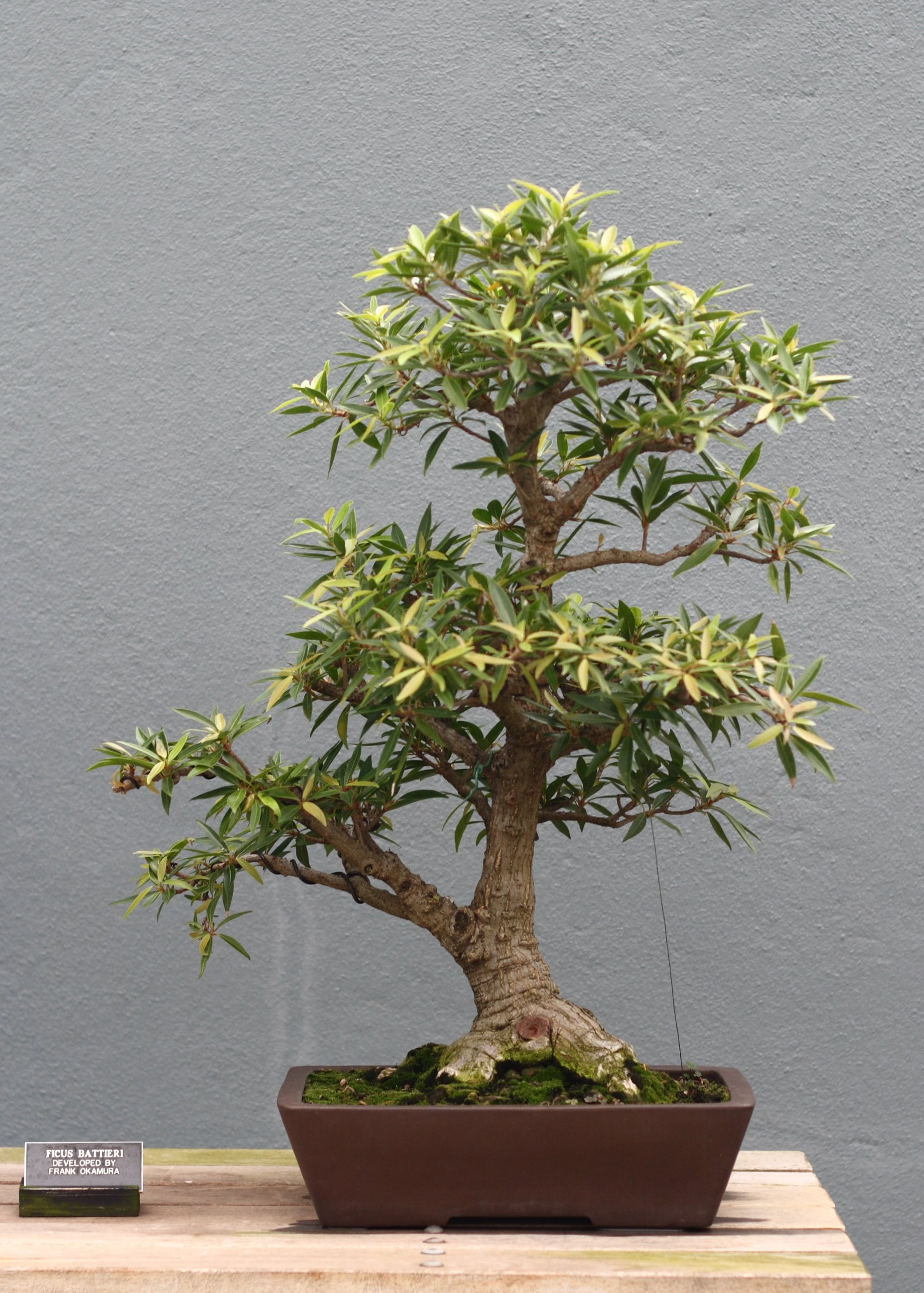
Ficus battieri bonsai developed by Frank Okamura

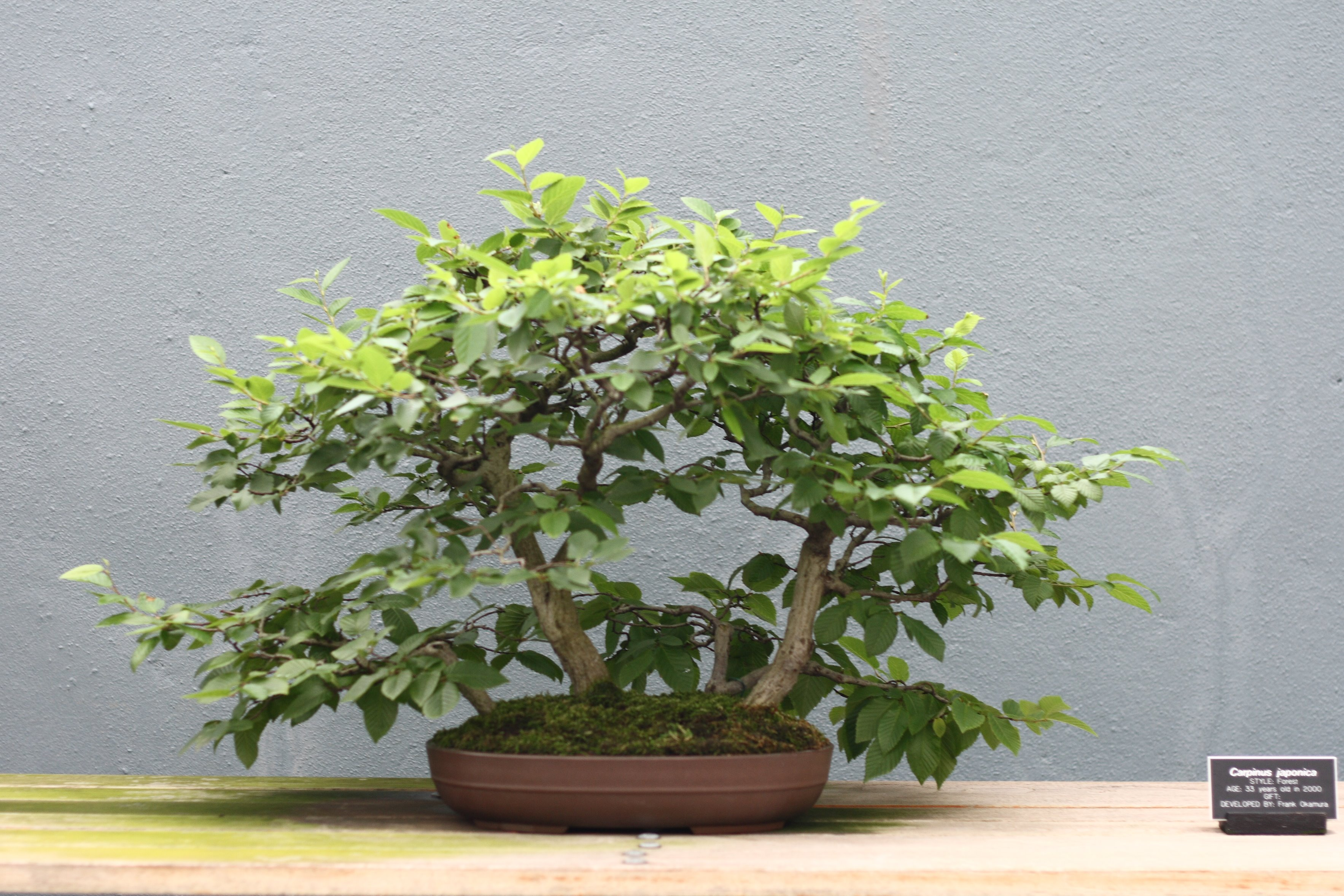
Carpinus japonica bonsai developed by Frank Okamura
