= William Niering =

American botanist (1924–1999)

William Albert Niering (1924 – August 30, 1999) was an American botanist and wetlands expert who was the Lucretia L. Allyn Professor of Botany at Connecticut College and director of the Connecticut College Arboretum.

== Early life and education ==
Niering was born in Scotrun, Pennsylvania, to George and Emma Everitt Niering. He attended Pennsylvania State University in 1942. His education was interrupted by World War II, when he served in the army from 1942 to 1945; his active service took place in the South Pacific and he attained the rank of staff sergeant. After the war, he returned to Penn State. There, he received his undergraduate degree in biology in 1948 and his master's degree in botany in 1950. He received his PhD in plant ecology from Rutgers University in 1952.

== Career ==
Niering joined the Connecticut College Botany Department in the fall of 1952.

At Connecticut College, Niering served as the director of the Connecticut College Arboretum from 1965 to 1968, and then from 1969 to 1988. In 1988, he became the Research Director for the Arboretum which he served for eleven years. He was acting President of Connecticut College from August 15 to December 15, 1992. He was a popular teacher and he established long-term vegetation research projects, providing opportunities for students to conduct field work and analyze change in the natural landscape over time. He helped found the Environmental Model Committee in the 1970s, a group of staff, students and faculty that help organize and encourage sustainability efforts at Connecticut College. He was an early proponent of sustainability on campus, helping to institute the first campus-wide recycling program.

His research spanned a variety of ecosystems, from Connecticut's shores and inlands to the islands of the South Pacific to the flora of the Southwest. He was an internationally recognized expert on the ecology of wetlands and tidal marshes. His work contributed to the scientific community's knowledge of the importance that wetlands serve in the environment. His work was instrumental in helping to pass the Connecticut Tidal Wetlands Act (1969) which prevented the loss of wetlands to dredge and filling activities. He also worked on ecological restoration efforts on wetlands in Connecticut and Long Island. He was an authority on vegetation management through controlled burns and herbicide application, which he researched and practiced at the Arboretum. From 1974 to 1977, Niering was a member of the advisory group, North Atlantic Regional Advisory Committee. He contributed to policy statements on urban parks as well as contributed to the planning process of the National Park Service. His scientific contributions spanned over many projects throughout his duration on the Regional Advisory Committee. One study in particular focused on the Pine Barrens of New Jersey. In 1978 Congress designated the Pine Barrens as the Pinelands National Preserve; this would not have been possible without the scientific knowledge of William Niering. In February 1980, the United States Department of the Interior awarded Niering the title of Honorary Park Ranger. This title came equipped with all the privileges and benefits of being a Park Ranger.

Niering was the editor of the scientific journal Restoration Ecology from its beginning in 1993 until his death.

== Death ==
William Niering died suddenly on August 30, 1999, at the age of 75. He had just addressed the incoming class of students at Connecticut College when he collapsed. On December 4, 2000, the Goshen Cove Natural Area Preserve in Waterford was renamed the William A. Niering Nature Preserve to honor his life and work.
