= Charles Henry Phillips =

English pharmacist and inventor of Phillips' Milk of Magnesia

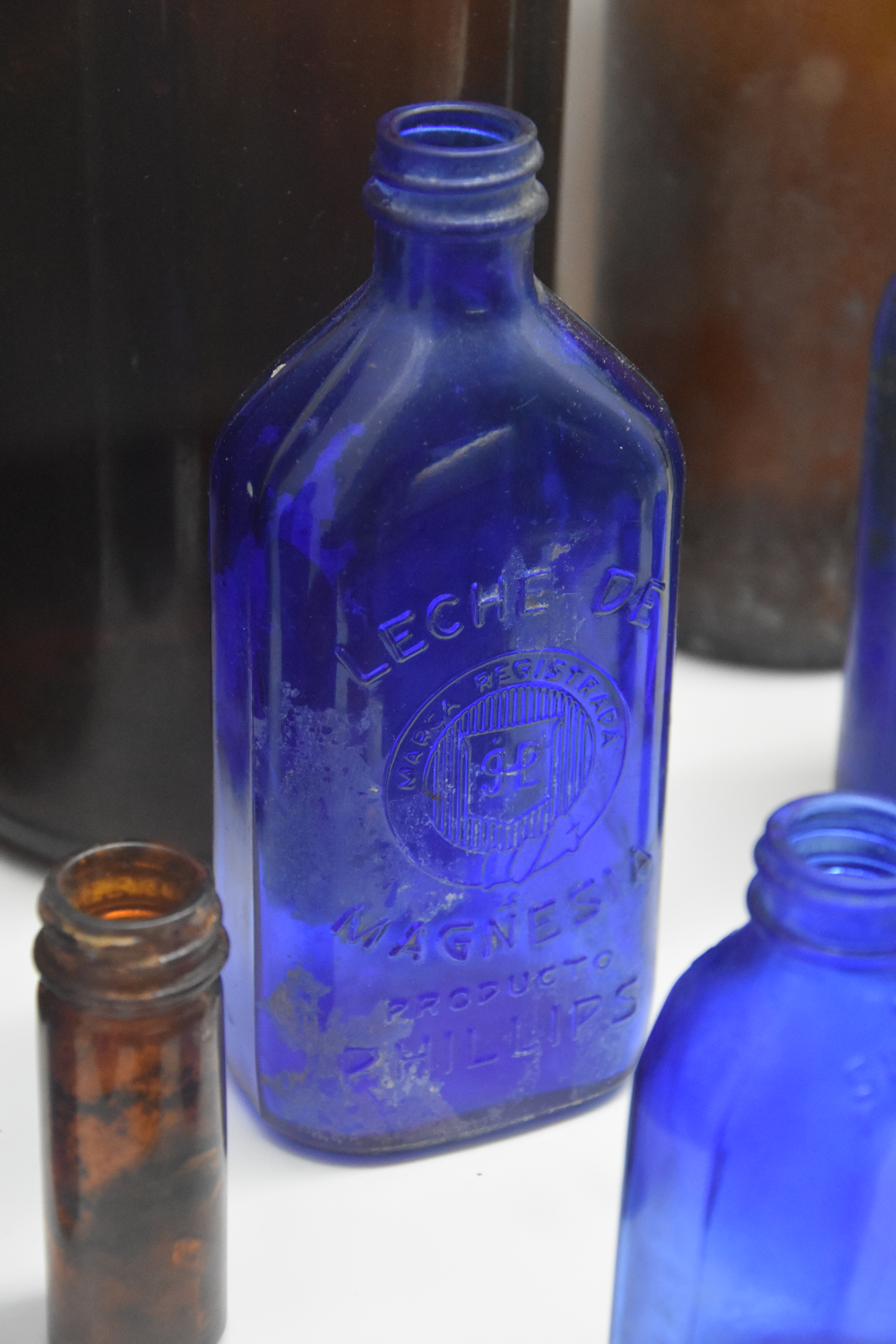
Bottle used for Phillips' Leche de Magnesia (Milk of Magnesia) in the Amber Museum, Santo Domingo, Dominican Republic

Charles Henry Phillips (1822–1888) was an English pharmacist, known for his invention Phillips' Milk of Magnesia.

== Early days ==
He moved from England to an estate at 666 Glenbrook Rd. in Glenbrook, a section of Stamford, Connecticut and established the Phillips Camphor and Wax Company there.

== The antacid concept ==
In Stamford he concocted and received a patent in 1873 for hydrate of magnesia mixed with water which he called "Milk of Magnesia".

== Final days, achievements and legacy ==
Phillips produced milk of magnesia and other pharmaceuticals at his Glenbrook firm, which incorporated in 1885 as the Charles H. Phillips Company. After Phillips' death of apoplexy in New York on 29 October 1888, his four sons ran the corporation until 1923, when it was acquired by Sterling Drug, Inc. Phillips' Milk of Magnesia is still manufactured today. The final blue bottle was filled in 1976, when production at the Glenbrook plant was phased out. Sterling, and its Phillips' Milk of Magnesia, was purchased by Bayer in 1994.
