= Magnesium hydroxide =

Inorganic compound of formula Mg(OH)_{2}

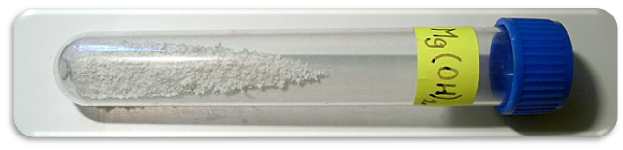
- Magnesium hydroxide

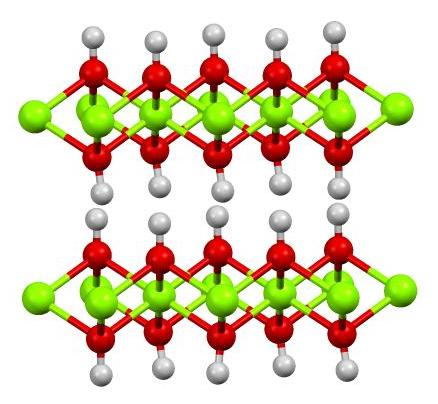
- Magnesium hydroxide

Names
- IUPAC name Magnesium hydroxide
- Other names: Magnesium dihydroxide; Milk of magnesia

Identifiers
CAS Number	1309-42-8
3D model (JSmol)	Interactive image
ChEBI	CHEBI:6637
ChEMBL	ChEMBL1200718
ChemSpider	14107
DrugBank	DB09104
ECHA InfoCard	100.013.792
EC Number	215-170-3
E number	E528 (acidity regulators, ...)
Gmelin Reference	485572
KEGG	C07876
PubChem CID	14791
RTECS number	OM3570000
UNII	NBZ3QY004S
CompTox Dashboard (EPA)	DTXSID4049662
- InChI: InChI=1S/Mg.2H2O/h;2*1H2/q+2;;/p-2 Key: VTHJTEIRLNZDEV-UHFFFAOYSA-L; InChI=1/Mg.2H2O/h;2*1H2/q+2;;/p-2 Key: VTHJTEIRLNZDEV-NUQVWONBAW
- SMILES: [Mg+2].[OH-].[OH-]

Properties
Chemical formula	Mg(OH)_{2}
Molar mass	58.3197 g/mol
Appearance	White solid
Odor	Odorless
Density	2.3446 g/cm^{3}
Melting point	350 °C (662 °F; 623 K) decomposes
Solubility in water	0.00064 g/100 mL (25 °C); 0.004 g/100 mL (100 °C)
Solubility product (K_{sp})	5.61×10^{−12}
Magnetic susceptibility (χ)	−22.1×10^{−6} cm^{3}/mol
Refractive index (n_{D})	1.559

Structure
Crystal structure	Hexagonal, hP3
Space group	P3̅m1 No. 164
Lattice constant	a = 0.312 nm, c = 0.473 nm

Thermochemistry
Heat capacity (C)	77.03 J/mol·K
Std molar entropy (S^{⦵}_{298})	64 J·mol^{−1}·K^{−1}
Std enthalpy of formation (Δ_{f}H^{⦵}_{298})	−924.7 kJ·mol^{−1}
Gibbs free energy (Δ_{f}G^{⦵})	−833.7 kJ/mol

Pharmacology
ATC code	A02AA04 (WHO) G04BX01 (WHO)

Hazards
- GHS labelling
Pictograms	(GHS07: Exclamation mark)
Signal word	Warning
Hazard statements	H315, H319, H335
Precautionary statements	P261, P280, P304+P340, P305+P351+P338, P405, P501
NFPA 704 (fire diamond)	1 0 0
Flash point	Non-flammable
- Lethal dose or concentration (LD, LC)
LD_{50} (median dose)	8500 mg/kg (rat, oral)
Safety data sheet (SDS)	External MSDS

Related compounds
Other anions	Magnesium oxide
Other cations	Beryllium hydroxide; Calcium hydroxide; Strontium hydroxide; Barium hydroxide
- Except where otherwise noted, data are given for materials in their standard state (at 25 °C [77 °F], 100 kPa). verify (what is ?) Infobox references

Magnesium hydroxide is an inorganic compound with the chemical formula Mg(OH)_{2}. It occurs in nature as the mineral brucite. It is a white solid with low solubility in water (K_{sp} = 5.61×10^{−12}). Magnesium hydroxide is a common component of antacids, such as milk of magnesia.

== Preparation ==
Treating the solution of different soluble magnesium salts with alkaline water induces the precipitation of the solid hydroxide Mg(OH)_{2}:

Mg^{2+} + 2 OH^{−} → Mg(OH)_{2}

As Mg^{2+} is the second most abundant cation present in seawater after Na^{+}, it can be economically extracted directly from seawater by alkalinisation as described above. On an industrial scale, Mg(OH)_{2} is produced by treating seawater with lime (Ca(OH)_{2}). A volume of 600 m^{3} (160,000 US gal) of seawater gives about 1 tonne (2,200 lb) of Mg(OH)_{2}. Ca(OH)_{2} (K_{sp} = 5.02×10^{−6}) is far more soluble than Mg(OH)_{2} (K_{sp} = 5.61×10^{−12}) and dramatically increases the pH value of seawater from 8.2 to 12.5. The less soluble Mg(OH)_{2} precipitates because of the common ion effect due to the OH^{−} added by the dissolution of Ca(OH)_{2}:

Mg^{2+} + Ca(OH)_{2} → Mg(OH)_{2} + Ca^{2+}

For seawater brines, precipitating agents other than Ca(OH)_{2} can be utilized, each with their own nuances:

- Use of Ca(OH)_{2} can yield CaSO_{4} or CaCO_{3}, which reduces the final purity of Mg(OH)_{2}.
- NH_{4}OH can produce explosive nitrogen trichloride when the brine is used for chlorine production.
- NaOH as the precipitating agent has longer settling times and is difficult to filter.

It has been demonstrated that sodium hydroxide, NaOH, is the better precipitating agent compared to Ca(OH)_{2} and NH_{4}OH due to higher recovery and purity rates, and the settling and filtration time can be improved at low temperatures and higher concentration of precipitates. Methods involving the use of precipitating agents are typically batch processes.

It is also possible to obtain Mg(OH)_{2} from seawater using electrolysis chambers separated with a cation exchange membrane. This process is continuous, lower-cost, and produces oxygen gas, hydrogen gas, sulfuric acid (if Na_{2}SO_{4} is used; NaCl can alternatively be used to yield HCl), and Mg(OH)_{2} of 98% or higher purity. It is crucial to deaerate the seawater to mitigate co-precipitation of calcium precipitates.

== Uses ==
=== Precursor to MgO ===
Most Mg(OH)_{2} that is produced industrially, as well as the small amount that is mined, is converted to fused magnesia (MgO). Magnesia is valuable because it is both a poor electrical conductor and an excellent thermal conductor.

=== Medical ===
Only a small amount of the magnesium from magnesium hydroxide is usually absorbed by the intestine (unless one is deficient in magnesium). However, magnesium is mainly excreted by the kidneys; so long-term, daily consumption of milk of magnesia by someone suffering from kidney failure could lead in theory to hypermagnesemia. Unabsorbed magnesium is excreted in feces; absorbed magnesium is rapidly excreted in urine.

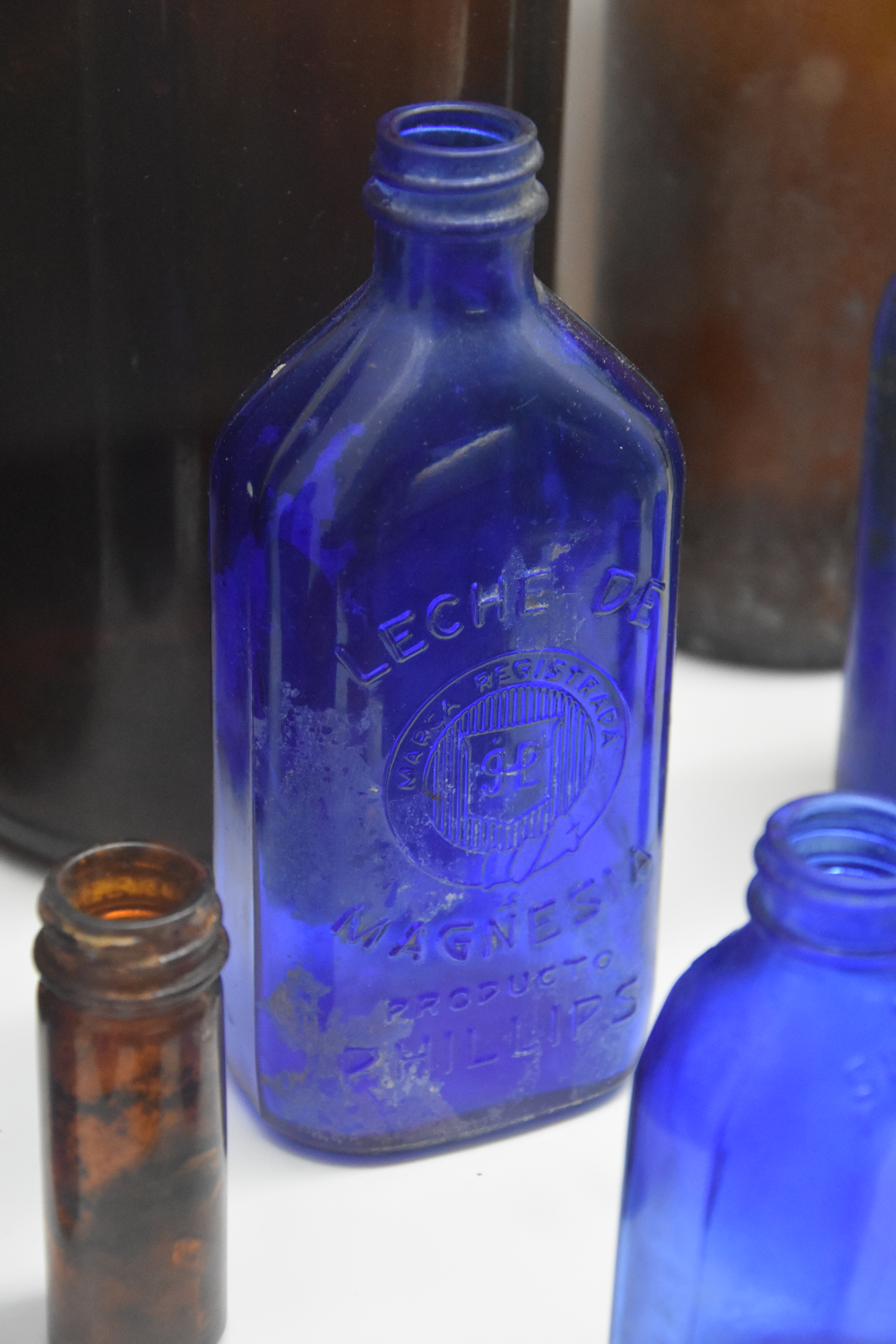
Bottle used for Phillips' Leche de Magnesia (Milk of Magnesia) in the Amber Museum, Santo Domingo, Dominican Republic

==== Applications ====
===== Antacid =====
As an antacid, magnesium hydroxide is dosed at approximately 0.5–1.5 g in adults and works by simple neutralization, in which the hydroxide ions from the Mg(OH)_{2} combine with acidic H^{+} ions (or hydronium ions) produced in the form of hydrochloric acid by parietal cells in the stomach, to produce water.

===== Laxative =====
As a laxative, magnesium hydroxide is dosed at 5–10 grams (0.18–0.35 oz), and works in a number of ways. First, Mg^{2+} is poorly absorbed from the intestinal tract, so it draws water from the surrounding tissue by osmosis. Not only does this increase in water content to soften the feces, it also increases the volume of feces in the intestine (intraluminal volume) which naturally stimulates intestinal motility. Furthermore, Mg^{2+} ions cause the release of cholecystokinin (CCK), which results in intraluminal accumulation of water and electrolytes, and increased intestinal motility. Some sources claim that the hydroxide ions themselves do not play a significant role in the laxative effects of milk of magnesia, as alkaline solutions (i.e., solutions of hydroxide ions) are not strongly laxative, and non-alkaline Mg^{2+} solutions, like MgSO_{4}, are equally strong laxatives, mole for mole.

==== History of milk of magnesia ====
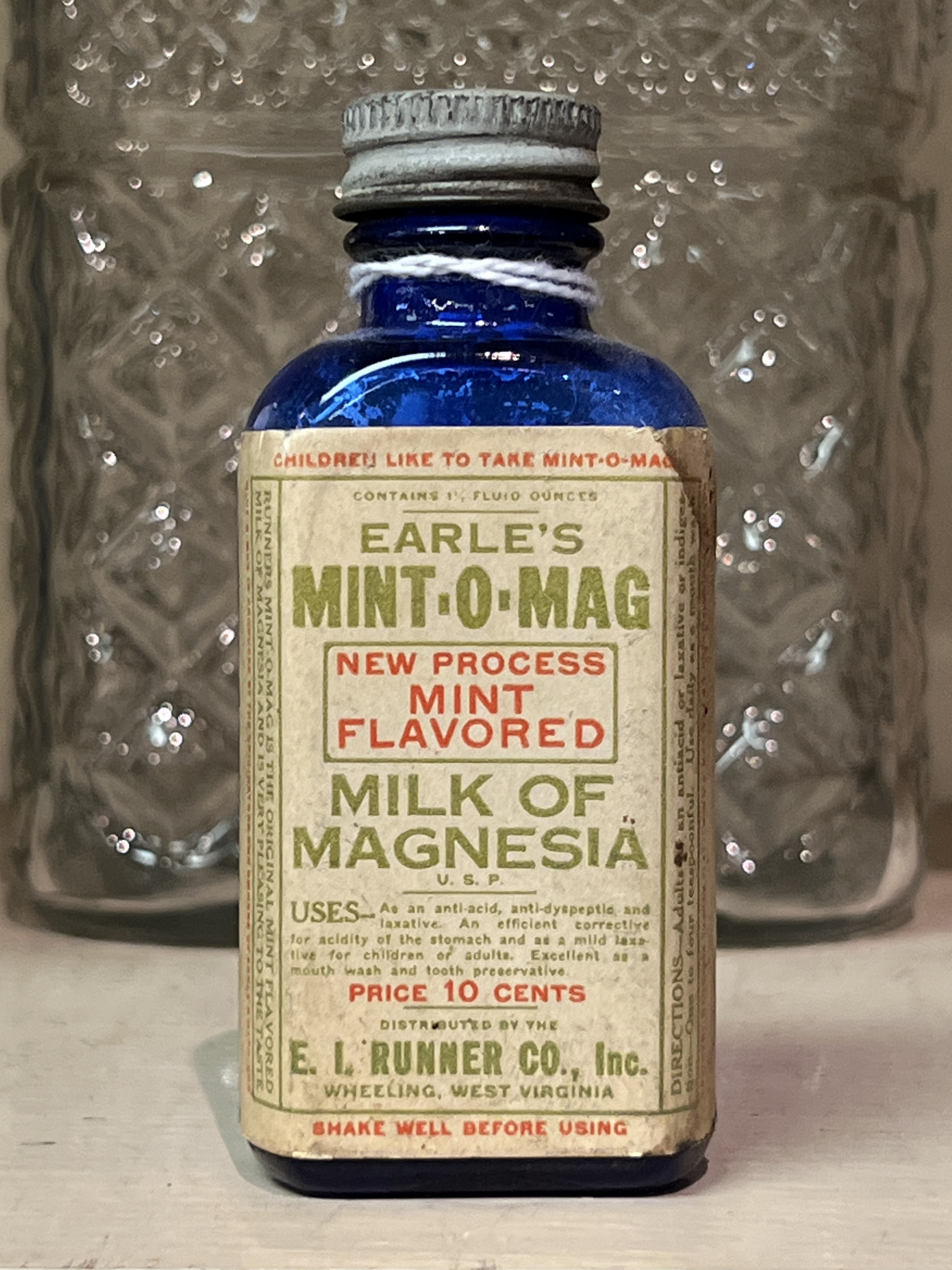
Vintage bottle for milk of magnesia

On May 4, 1818, American inventor Koen Burrows received a patent (No. X2952) for magnesium hydroxide. In 1829, Sir James Murray used a "condensed solution of fluid magnesia" preparation of his own design to treat the Lord Lieutenant of Ireland, the Marquess of Anglesey, for stomach pain. This was so successful (advertised in Australia and approved by the Royal College of Surgeons in 1838) that he was appointed resident physician to Anglesey and two subsequent Lords Lieutenant, and knighted. His fluid magnesia product was patented two years after his death, in 1873.

The term milk of magnesia was first used by Charles Henry Phillips in 1872 for a suspension of magnesium hydroxide formulated at about 8% w/v. It was sold under the brand name Phillips' Milk of Magnesia for medicinal usage.

USPTO registrations show that the terms "Milk of Magnesia" and "Phillips' Milk of Magnesia" have both been assigned to Bayer since 1995. In the UK, the non-brand (generic) name of "Milk of Magnesia" and "Phillips' Milk of Magnesia" is "Cream of Magnesia" (Magnesium Hydroxide Mixture, BP).

=== As food additive ===
It is added directly to human food, and is affirmed as generally recognized as safe by the US Food and Drug Administration. It is known as E number E528.

Magnesium hydroxide is marketed for medical use in the form of chewable tablets, capsules, powders, and as liquid suspensions, which are sometimes flavored. These products are sold as antacids to neutralize stomach acid and relieve indigestion and heartburn.

It is also a laxative used to alleviate constipation. As a laxative, the osmotic force of the magnesia acts to draw fluids from the body. High doses can lead to diarrhea and can deplete the body's supply of potassium, sometimes leading to muscle cramps. Some magnesium hydroxide products sold for antacid use (such as Maalox) are formulated to minimize unwanted laxative effects through the inclusion of aluminum hydroxide, which inhibits the contractions of smooth muscle cells in the gastrointestinal tract, thereby counterbalancing the contractions induced by the osmotic effects of the magnesium hydroxide.

=== Other niche uses ===
Magnesium hydroxide is also a component of antiperspirant.

==== Waste water treatment ====
Magnesium hydroxide powder is used industrially to neutralize acidic wastewaters. It is also a component of the Biorock method of building artificial reefs. The main advantage of Mg(OH)_{2} over Ca(OH)_{2}, is to impose a lower pH better compatible with that of seawater and sea life: pH 10.5 for Mg(OH)_{2} in place of pH 12.5 with Ca(OH)_{2}.

==== Fire retardant ====
Natural magnesium hydroxide (brucite) is used commercially as a fire retardant. Most industrially used magnesium hydroxide is produced synthetically. Like aluminum hydroxide, solid magnesium hydroxide has smoke suppressing and flame retardant properties. This property is attributable to the endothermic decomposition it undergoes at 332 °C (630 °F):

Mg(OH)_{2} → MgO + H_{2}O

The heat absorbed by the reaction retards the fire by delaying ignition of the associated substance. The water released dilutes combustible gases. Common uses of magnesium hydroxide as a flame retardant include additives to cable insulation, insulation plastics, roofing, and various flame retardant coatings.

== Mineralogy ==
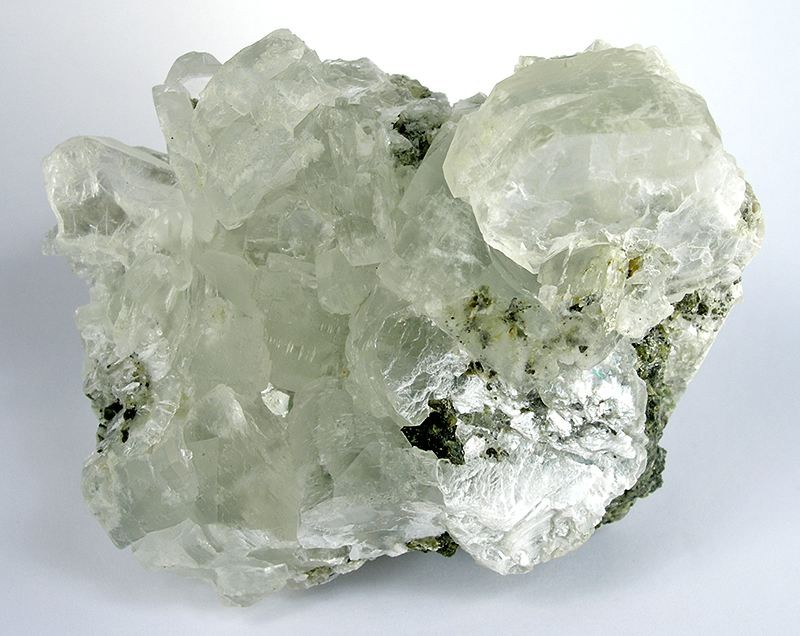
Brucite crystals (mineral form of Mg(OH)_{2}) from the Sverdlovsk Region, Urals, Russia (size: 10.5 cm × 7.8 cm × 7.4 cm or 4.1 in × 3.1 in × 2.9 in)

Brucite, the mineral form of Mg(OH)_{2} commonly found in nature also occurs in the 1:2:1 clay minerals amongst others, in chlorite, in which it occupies the interlayer position usually filled by monovalent and divalent cations such as Na^{+}, K^{+}, Mg^{2+} and Ca^{2+}. As a consequence, chlorite interlayers are cemented by brucite and cannot swell or shrink.

Brucite, in which some of the Mg^{2+} cations have been substituted by Al^{3+} cations, becomes positively charged and constitutes the main basis of layered double hydroxide (LDH). LDH minerals as hydrotalcite are powerful anion sorbents but are relatively rare in nature.

== Concrete degradation ==
Brucite may also crystallize in cement and concrete in contact with seawater. Indeed, the Mg^{2+} cation is the second-most-abundant cation in seawater, just behind Na^{+} and before Ca^{2+}.

When cement or concrete are exposed to Mg^{2+} and SO^{2−}_{4} ions simultaneously present in seawater, the precipitation of the poorly soluble brucite contributes to enhance the formation of gypsum in the sulfate attack:

MgSO_{4} + Ca(OH)_{2} + 2 H_{2}O → Mg(OH)_{2} + CaSO_{4} . 2H_{2}O

The precipitation of insoluble Mg(OH)_{2} helps to considerably drive the chemical equilibrium of the reaction to the right. It exacerbates the sulfate attack resulting in the formation of gypsum and ettringite (an expansive phase) responsible for the mechanical stress in the hardened cement paste. However, brucite, a phase with a small molar volume (24.63 cm^{3}/mol), may contribute to clogging the porous network in the hardened cement paste, hindering the diffusion of these harmful reactive species in the cement matrix. This can delay the decalcification of the C-S-H phase (the "glue" phase in the hardened cement paste responsible for the cohesion in concrete) and its transformation into an M-S-H phase.

Prolonged contact between seawater or Mg-rich brines and concrete may induce durability issues for regularly immersed concrete components or structures.

The exact mechanism of brucite degradation of hardened cement paste remains a matter of debate. If brucite had a high molar volume, it could be de facto considered a swelling phase (like ettringite, or highly hydrated minerals), but this does not appear to be the case. It is unclear if it causes expansion or not, and how. If it replaces another phase locally (topo chemical replacement), in cases where its molar volume is smaller than that of the phase it replaces, no expansion is expected; rather, a decrease in porosity is anticipated. However, if it crystallizes in a large number of tiny crystals growing between existing ones, even with a small molar volume, it could exert a considerable crystallization pressure in the cement matrix, resulting in tensile stress, expansion and cracking.

For the same reason, dolomite cannot be used as construction aggregate for making concrete. The reaction of magnesium carbonate with the free alkali hydroxides present in the cement porewater also leads to the formation of brucite, a mineral phase with a low molar volume, but often accompanied by other expansive reaction products (with a higher molar volume than brucite compensating for its shrinkage).

MgCO_{3} + 2 NaOH → Mg(OH)_{2} + Na_{2}CO_{3}

This reaction, one of the two prominent alkali–aggregate reaction (AAR), is also known as alkali–carbonate reaction.

== See also ==
- Portlandite – calcium hydroxide: Ca(OH)_{2}
