= Coffee bean storage =

Packaging and preservation of coffee beans

Coffee bean storage is a broad term describing the packaging and preservation of coffee beans throughout the process from harvesting to brewing. Although the term is applicable to many phases of this process, it is typically applied to ideal home storage for maximum consumer coffee enjoyment.

== Green coffee ==
After the cherries are put through the pulper and the seeds have been soaked, they are set out to sun-dry for a period of one week. The beans are periodically raked to ensure even drying. Once dried, the beans will form a thin, paper-like shell called parchment. Once formed, the parchment will increase the beans’ storage life considerably. When the beans are ready, the parchment is removed, and the beans are graded and sorted according to size, weight, and defects. The sorted beans are then stored in 60 or 70 kg sacks called sisal bags that help the beans retain moisture for a longer period of time. The storage time cannot exceed one year for the beans to be considered a current crop. If the green coffee remains in storage for longer than a year, it is considered an old crop and is less valuable because of its drier state.

== Roast coffee ==
Once a coffee bean is roasted, it is either packaged immediately for sale or ground and then packaged for sale. Packages used are typically either an airtight plastic container or vacuum-sealed wrapping, or a folded-over bag with a pressure relief valve. Each type of package has its own advantages. The airtight containers allow the maximum freshness of the bean and prolong its shelf life, whilst the valve allows excess carbon dioxide, and other gases to escape. The carbon dioxide, as much as 10 L/kg of coffee for dark-roasted coffee, is not released because it is harmful to the flavour—quite the contrary, it protects the beans against oxidation, but excess pressure could damage the container. Reported experience is that a few days of carbon dioxide release is needed between roasting and brewing for best results. There is also informed opinion that storage of freshly roasted beans in a can pressurised with nitrogen gas, with excess pressure buildup vented via a relief valve, provides optimal storage for extended periods while promoting a beneficial ageing effect related to the distribution of natural oils by the pressure.

== Home storage ==
Once bought, the method of storage used depends on the type of coffee purchased. Green beans store the best in cooled airtight containers, and can easily last in this state for a year without losing flavor. Roasted whole beans are best stored in airtight containers out of the light. The best material choices for the container are ceramic, or opaque glass. Plastic and metal may alter the flavor of the coffee bean. In addition, for the first week of storage, containers should be opened or vented by a relief valve to release the carbon dioxide gas that will be produced by the roasted beans to prevent the gas from changing the quality of the coffee. Whole bean roasted coffee stored in this manner will last for about two weeks. The advisability of freezing roasted beans is controversial. Those advocating freezing believe that the flavour can then last for one to two months. If beans are frozen, leaving them frozen until brewing best preserves the flavour of the coffee. Frozen beans will grind the same as unfrozen beans, but refreezing beans alters the quality of the coffee. Coffee grounds are stored in metal containers that are non-reactive airtight ceramic or glass containers, like roasted beans. Due to increased total surface area of coffee grounds, the grounds go stale in days, rather than weeks. In addition, freezing has no effect in increasing the storage life of coffee grounds.
