= Home roasting coffee =

Roasting coffee beans for personal consumption

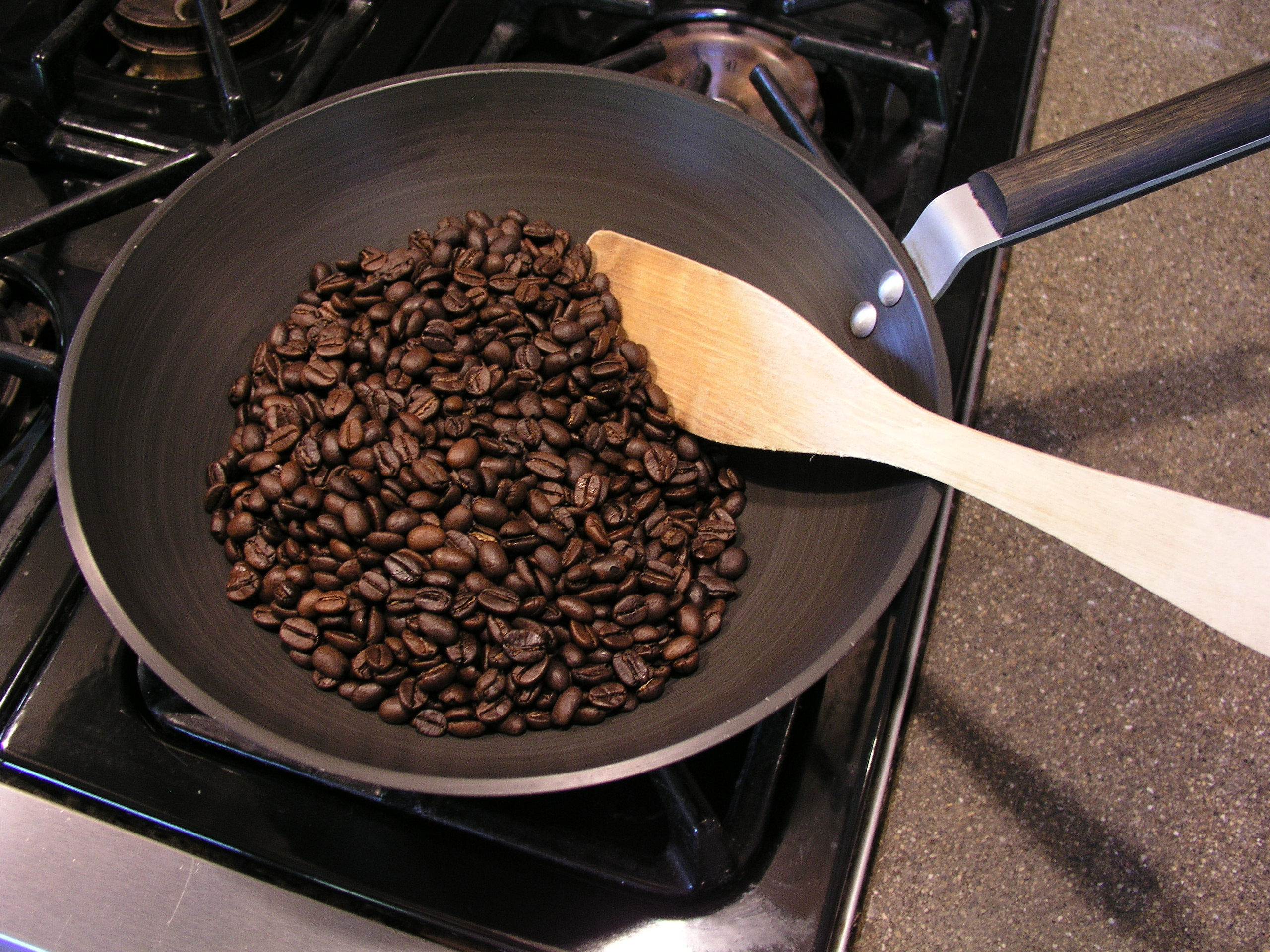
Roasting coffee beans in a wok on a kitchen stovetop

Home roasting is the process of roasting coffee from green coffee beans on a small scale for personal consumption. Home roasting of coffee has been practiced for centuries, using simple methods such as roasting in cast-iron skillets over a wood fire and hand-turning small steel drums on a kitchen stovetop.

Until the early 20th century, it was more common to roast coffee at home than to buy pre-roasted coffee. Following World War I, commercial coffee roasting became prevalent, and, combined with the distribution of instant coffee, home roasting decreased substantially.

In recent years, there has been a revival in home roasting. What was originally a necessity has now become a hobby. The attractions are four-fold: enjoying fresh, flavorful coffee; experimenting with various beans and roasting methods; perfecting the roasting process, and saving money. Other factors that have contributed to the renewed interest in home roasting coffee include coffee suppliers selling green coffee in small quantities and manufacturers making counter-top roasters.

== History ==
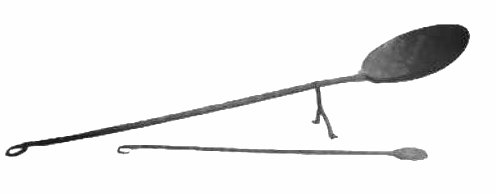
15th-century coffee roasting pan and stirring spoon from Baghdad

The first known implements specially made for roasting coffee beans for personal use were thin, circular, often perforated pans made from metal or porcelain, used in the 15th century in the Ottoman Empire and Greater Persia. This type of shallow, dished pan was equipped with a long handle so that it could be held over a brazier (a container of hot coals) until the coffee was roasted. The beans were stirred with a slender spoon. Only a small amount of beans could be heated at one time. The first cylinder roaster with a crank to keep the beans in motion appeared in Cairo around 1650. It was made of metal, most commonly tinned copper or cast iron, and was held over a brazier or open fire. French, Dutch and Italian variations of this design quickly appeared. These proved popular over the next century in Europe, England and the American colonies. English coffee merchant Humphrey Broadbent wrote in 1722 about his preference for this sort of cylindrical roaster. He emphasized that home roasting provided the capability of eliminating damaged berries from the batch before they are roasted, and also the security of knowing that duplicitous merchants were not adding poisonous lead powder to the roasted beans to increase their weight and thus their price. He wrote: "Most persons of distinction in Holland roast their own berries."

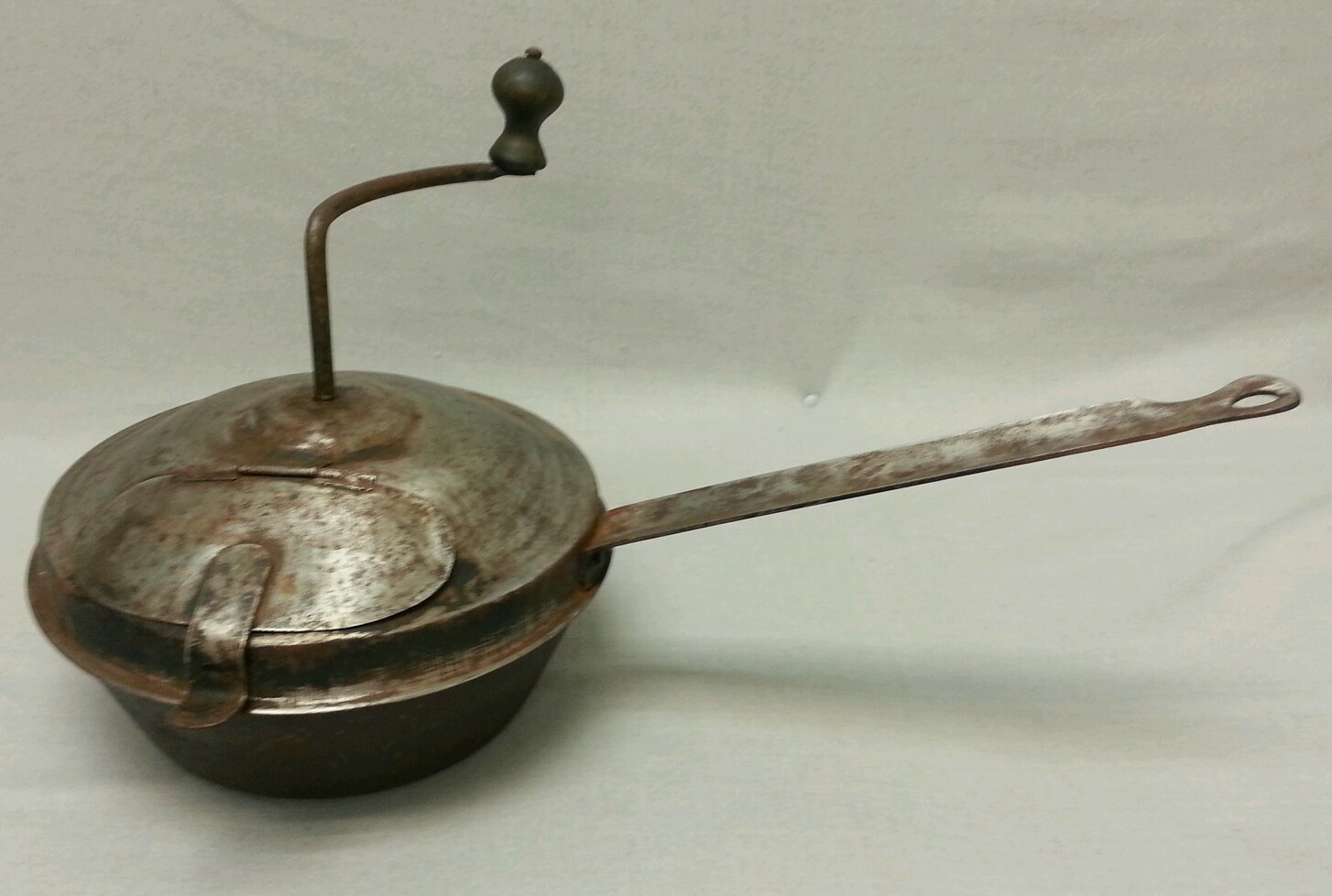
A hand-cranked wood stove top coffee roaster circa 1890–1910

In the 19th century, various patents were awarded in the U.S. and Europe for commercial roasters, to allow for large batches of coffee. Nevertheless, home roasting continued to be popular. A man working at a commercial roasting plant beginning in the 1850s in St. Louis, Missouri, said that "selling roasted coffee was up-hill work, as everyone roasted coffee in the kitchen oven." He said the arguments his company employed against home roasting included appeals to the economy of saving fuel and labor, the danger of burns and flaring tempers, and the possibility of ruined beans or bad-tasting beverage. Nevertheless, appliances catering to the home roaster were becoming popular; in 1849 a spherical coffee roaster was invented in Cincinnati, Ohio, for use on the top of a wood-fired kitchen stove, fitted into a burner opening. Inventor Jabez Burns, the nephew of Jabez Burns the religious scholar, noted that, with skill and experience, even the simplest implements such as a corn popper could be used in the home or camp to obtain evenly roasted coffee. He said in 1874 that "patent portable roasters are almost as numerous as rat traps or churns." Green beans were available at the local general store, or even through mail order; an early issue of the Sears catalog offered green coffee. For roasting, many people used such simple methods as a layer of beans on a metal sheet in the oven, or beans stirred in a cast-iron skillet over a fire. Despite the wide popularity of home roasting, Burns felt that it would soon disappear because of the great strides made in commercial roasting in the 1860s and 1870s, including the benefits of the economies of scale. The commercial roaster inventions patented by Burns revolutionized the U.S. roasting industry, much like the innovations of inventors in Emmerich am Rhein greatly advanced commercial coffee roasting in Germany. As well, the 1864 marketing breakthrough of the Arbuckle Brothers in Philadelphia, introducing the convenient one-pound (0.45 kg) paper bag of roasted coffee, brought success and imitators. From that time commercially roasted coffee grew in popularity until it gradually overtook home roasting during the 1900s in America. In 1903 and 1906 the first electric roasters were patented in the U.S. and Germany, respectively; these commercial devices eliminated the problem of smoke or fuel vapor imparting a bad taste to the coffee. In France, the home roaster did not yield to the commercial roaster until after the 1920s, especially in rural areas. Coffee was roasted to a dark color in small batches at home and by shopkeepers, using a variety of appliances including ones with a rotating cylinder of glass, sheet iron or wire mesh, and ones driven by hand, clockwork or electric motor. Because of the smoke and blowing chaff, country dwellers generally roasted outdoors.

Through the 1970s and 1980s, the Siemens Sirocco home roaster was made in West Germany and marketed globally. It was a small fluid-bed roaster made for the home enthusiast. The product was named after a commercial hot-air roasting process which itself was named after the hot Sahara winds called sirocco. In 1976, chemical engineer Michael Sivetz patented a competing hot air design for manufacture in the U.S.; this became popular as an economical alternative. Sivetz called for the home roaster to focus on the quality of the bean. From 1986 through 1999 there was a surge in the number of patents filed for home roasting appliances. In the 1980s and 1990s, specialty coffee houses began opening to cater to the connoisseur.In the 1990s, more electric home roasting equipment became available, including drum roasters, and variations on the fluid-bed roaster. By 2001, gourmet coffee aficionados were using the internet to purchase green estate-grown beans for delivery by mail.

== Advantages ==
Enjoying coffee made from freshly roasted beans is one of the major driving factors in the popularity of home roasting. Home roasting has the advantage of being able to roast smaller volumes of coffee to match consumption so that the roasted coffee is used before it goes stale. Depending on the bean's origin and the method of storage after roasting, generally whole bean coffee flavor is at its peak between seven and fourteen days after roasting, but some beans are best left even longer, up to 21 days. The flavor of ground coffee deteriorates even faster. Methods of extending freshness include refrigeration, freezing, vacuum packaging, and displacing oxygen in the container with an inert gas. Green coffee beans can be kept fresh for 1–3 years, depending upon storage conditions, and more particular home roasters reduce storage time to 8 or even 1.5 months.

Other advantages include the enjoyment of top quality coffee in areas where there are no good local roasters, and the benefit of lower price overall. Those who are roasting for economic reasons can purchase green beans in bulk at lower cost than roasted beans from retailers. Depending on the type of beans chosen, home roasters can save approximately 25–50%.

Home roasters have access to a wide selection of green coffee beans, and this is one of the attractions to the hobby. Home roasters can purchase small quantities of high quality beans from numerous importers and distributors. Some of the beans are rare or award-winning, while others are from coffee orchards known for their quality and unique flavor. It is common for home roasters to purchase beans that come from a specific country, region, orchard, and harvest year.

== Roasting ==
Home roasters can choose from various types of roasting equipment, each of which has certain attributes that can alter the flavor. A roasting profile describes the time the beans spend at each temperature during roasting including the final temperature prior to cooling. This greatly affects the flavor, aroma, and body of the coffee. Home roasters go to great lengths to control these roasting parameters including using computers or programmable controllers for process control and data logging. Manually controlled equipment makes precise and repeatable profile control more difficult, though an experienced roaster can produce very good results. One of the lures of the hobby is experimenting with the roasting profile to produce optimal tasting coffee, albeit subjective.

Coffee roasting produces chaff and smoke, and should be done in a well-ventilated area, which is often difficult to accomplish in a home environment. Coffee roasting outdoors is affected by changes in air temperature and speed, requiring adjustments to the roasting process to produce intended results.

== Equipment ==
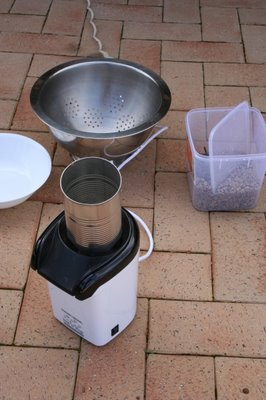
Home roasting outdoors with a modified popcorn maker

There are four common techniques for modern home roasting: in the oven, on the top of the stove, in a hot-air popper made for popcorn, and in a purpose-built electrical appliance.

Green coffee beans can be roasted in a convection oven provided that the beans are spread out in only one layer on a perforated baking tray with raised sides. Because they are not stirred, the beans at the perimeter of the tray get dark first. The oven area should be well ventilated because a lot of smoke will be generated. This method produces coffee beans with a variety of roast levels as it is almost impossible to achieve a consistent roast, however, some people like the resultant melange roast.

The beans may also be roasted on the stove top. One classic method is to use open-top cookware such as a cast-iron skillet, a frying pan, or a wok, the beans constantly stirred to obtain an even degree of roasting. Another option is to use a stove-top popcorn maker such as a "Whirley Pop" or similar device with an integral crank and internal agitator system to keep the beans in motion as they roast. Constant cranking or stirring is required, as is plenty of ventilation.

The hot-air popper is sometimes pressed into service as a coffee roaster, but such a light-duty appliance is not designed to withstand the longer heat cycle required by coffee beans. As a result, the hot-air popper used for coffee may fail from heat damage. This method of roasting produces somewhat less smoke than oven or stove-top but it still requires good ventilation. It also blows chaff off of the roasting beans, so cleaning up the scattered chaff is a consideration. If used indoors, the room may retain a smoky smell long afterward. Roasting outdoors is an option.

After using any of the above methods, the roasted beans must be manually cooled. A common method is to shake or toss them in a metal colander for a few minutes.

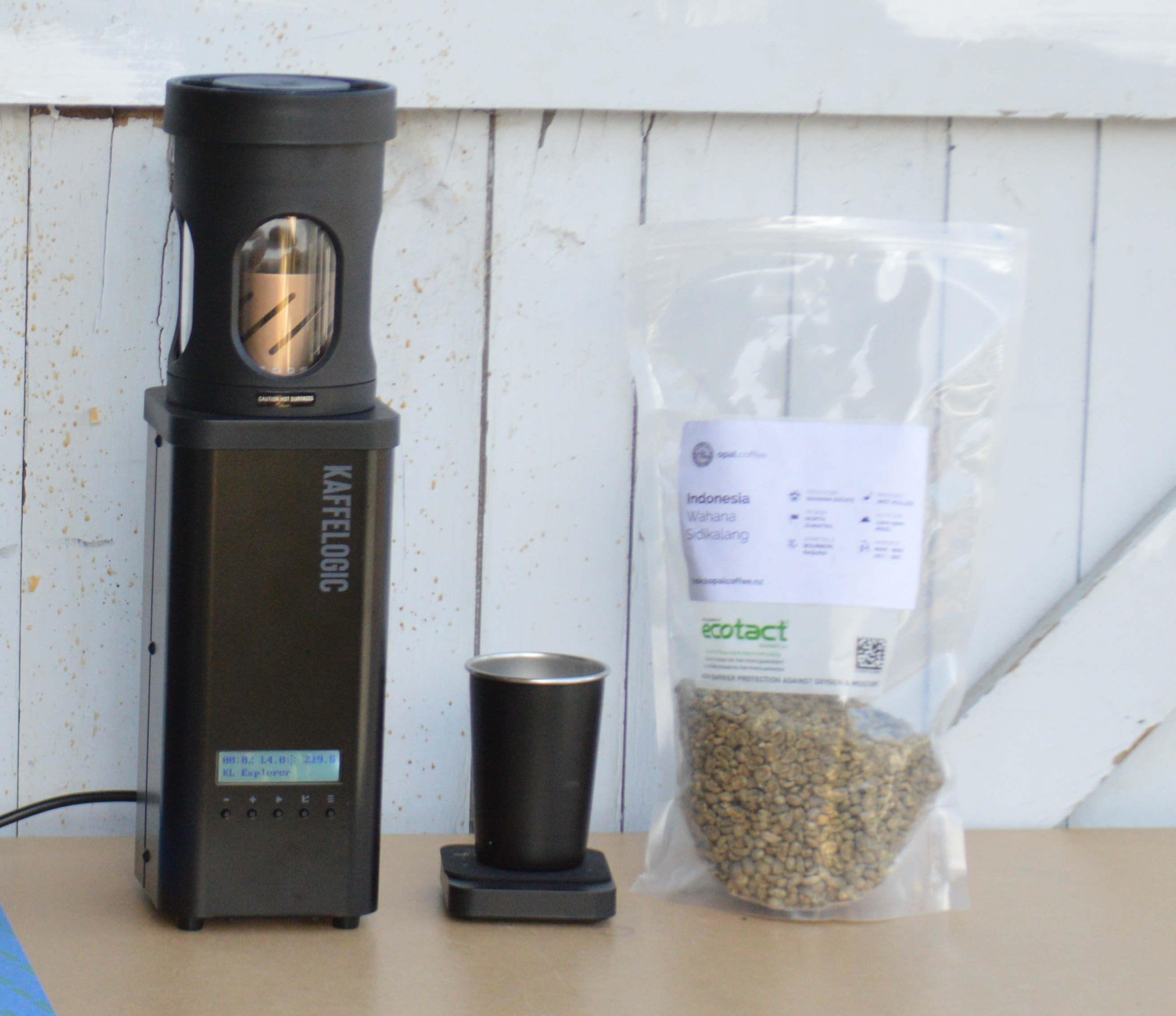
Kaffelogic Nano 7 Coffee Roaster

Specially designed electric coffee roasters have been available since the 1970s. These counter-top appliances automate the roasting process, including a cooling cycle at the end. Unlike hot-air poppers they are designed to withstand extended high temperature operation. Two main types exist: the fluid-bed or fluid-air roaster, and the drum roaster. The fluid-bed roaster heats the beans faster, retaining more of their desirable acidic flavor compounds. However, the resulting roasted bean is tougher, harder to grind, and less of it ends up as "mouth feel" or body in the coffee beverage. The drum roaster takes more time so the acidic compounds are less in evidence, having evaporated somewhat to yield a mellow-tasting beverage. The roasted bean is softer and easier to grind, and more of it contributes to the body of the beverage.

One drawback of the electric roasting appliances is their small capacity: 4 to 8 ounces (110 to 230 g) for fluid-bed, and somewhat more for drum roasters. They are also expensive. Another drawback is that most models emit smoke.

No matter what roasting method is used, the weather can affect the results, especially if roasting outdoors. Cold temperatures can extend the roasting time, adversely affecting the bean. In extreme cold the roaster may fail to reach proper temperature. Humidity is a lesser concern; it changes the roasting time and resulting quality.

Other unusual home roasting methods have been tried by inventive enthusiasts, such as various modifications of fluid-bed roasters and popcorn poppers, the use of a heat gun aimed into a metal bowl, a heat gun aimed into a bread machine, a modified rotisserie in a gas-fired barbecue grill, and many more.

== See also ==
- Dry roasting
