= Torrefacto =

Particular process of roasting coffee beans

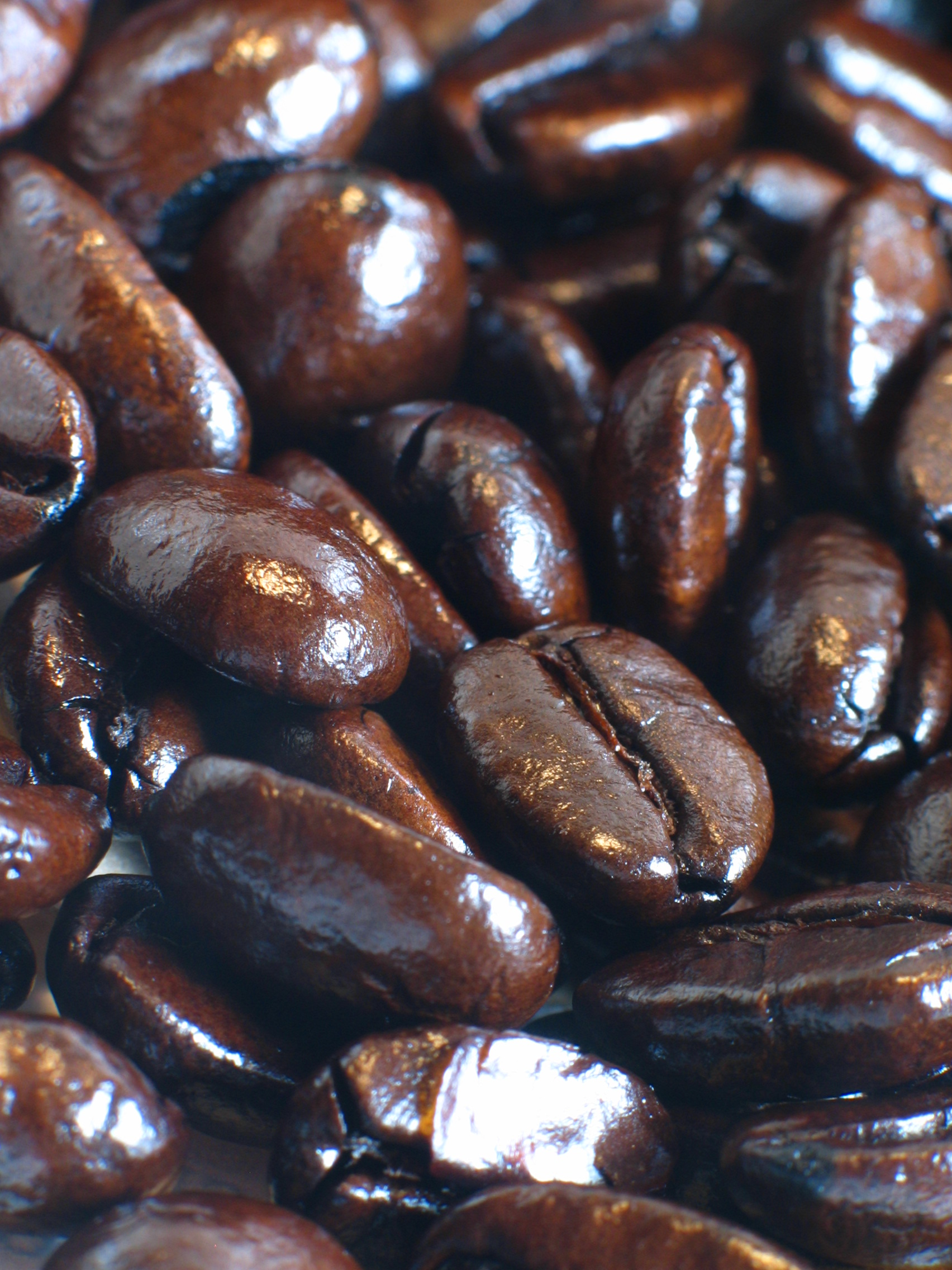
Torrefacto coffee beans (roasted with sugar)

Torrefacto refers to a particular process of roasting coffee beans, common in Spain, Paraguay, Portugal, Mexico, Costa Rica, Ecuador, Uruguay and Argentina. The process involves adding a certain amount of sugar during roasting in order to glaze the beans. By adding the additional sugar to the beans it increases the effects of the Maillard reaction during the roasting process, thus giving the beans more of that distinct flavor. The glazed beans are then mixed with normal roasted beans. While originally a cheap way of preserving the coffee beans in the 1920s, due to the common use of low-grade Robusta coffee the process was also used to hide negative aroma taste characteristics of the coffee.

The addition of sugar during the torrefacto roasting process increases the production of compounds with antioxidant properties. Both ground and brewed torrefacto coffee has higher antioxidant capacity than standard roasts, decreased pro-oxidant activities were also observed in a study. In addition, the espresso method of extraction yielded higher antioxidant activity than other brewing methods.
