= Popcorn maker =

Type of food preparation device

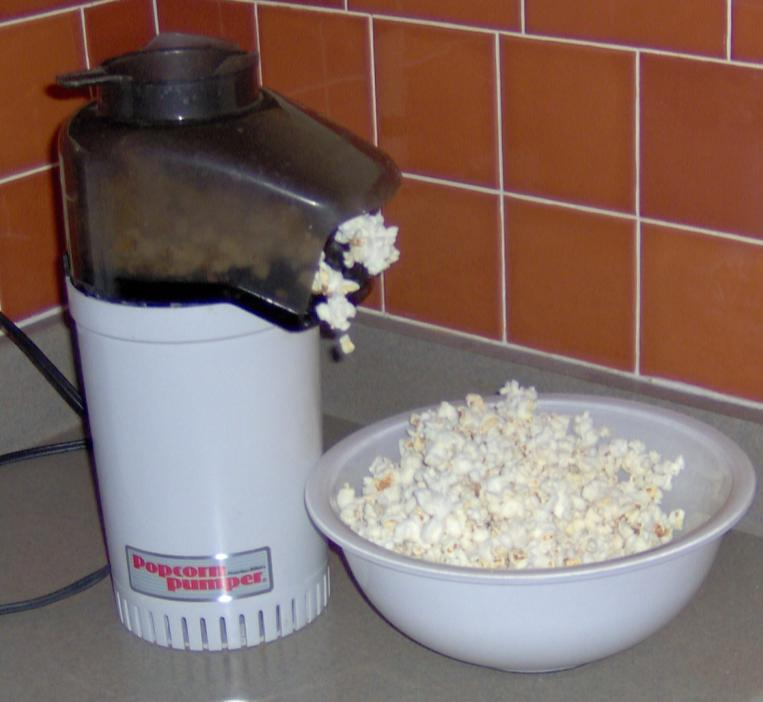
A hot-air home popcorn maker

A popcorn maker (also called a popcorn copper) is a machine used to make popcorn. Since ancient times, popcorn has been a popular snack food, produced through the explosive expansion of kernels of heated corn (maize). Charles Cretors invested in commercial large-scale popcorn machines in the late 19th century. Many types of small-scale home methods for popping corn also exist.

Commercial popcorn machines are commonly found in movie theaters and carnivals, producing popcorn in a pan of hot oil, so approximately 45% of the calories are derived from fat. Hot-air popcorn poppers for home use appeared in the late 1970s; these produce popcorn with only 5% of its calories derived from fat.

The majority of popcorn sold for home consumption is now packaged in a microwave popcorn bag for use in a microwave oven. As a result, the popularity of popcorn makers for home use has greatly decreased in the last few decades.

== History ==
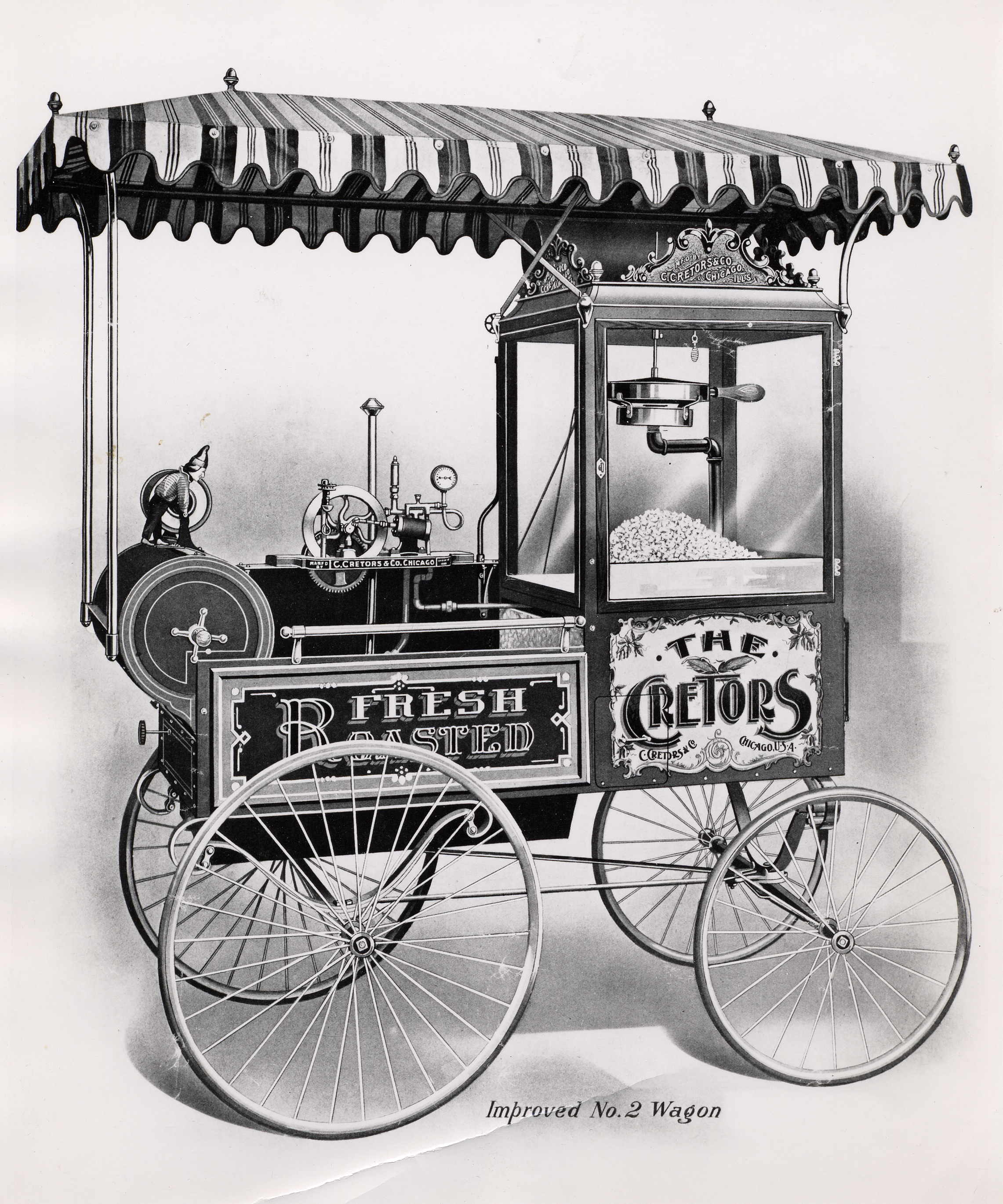
An early popcorn machine in a street cart, invented in the 1880s by Charles Cretors in Chicago

=== Popcorn wagon ===
Charles Cretors traveled the Midwest, settling in Fort Scott, Kansas, and then Decatur, Illinois. He worked in the painting and contracting business and later opened a bakery and eventually a confectionery shop. To broaden his offerings in the confectionery store, he bought a peanut roaster, which he redesigned to improve its operation. Driven by a small steam engine, it was the first automated peanut roaster. In 1885, he moved his family to Chicago to focus on selling his machine.

Cretors purchased a vendor's license and placed the machine on the sidewalk in front of his shop to test his peanut roaster and earn money. The date on the license, December 2, 1885, marks the inception of C. Cretors & Company. A traveling salesman, J.M. Savage, offered to sell the machine in his territory and became Cretors' first salesman. Cretors' machines, being automated, made operation more predictable; in addition, the novelty of the steam engine and the Tosty Rosty Man, a small mechanical clown that acted as a merchandiser, made the machines themselves attractive.

By 1893, Cretors had created a steam-powered machine that could roast 12 pounds of peanuts and 20 pounds of coffee, popcorn, and bake chestnuts. Since popcorn was becoming a popular choice for snack food, Cretors redesigned his machine to roast peanuts and pop popcorn simultaneously. It was the first automated machine that could pop popcorn uniformly in its own seasonings, guaranteeing a predictable product. Cretors applied for a patent on his automated peanut roaster and popcorn popper machine on August 10, 1891, and U.S. Patent 506,207 was granted on October 10, 1893.

Cretors took his new popcorn wagon and peanut roaster to the midway of Chicago's Columbian Exposition in 1893. They introduced the new corn product to the public in a newly designed machine that included a popcorn wagon.

=== Popcorn cannon ===
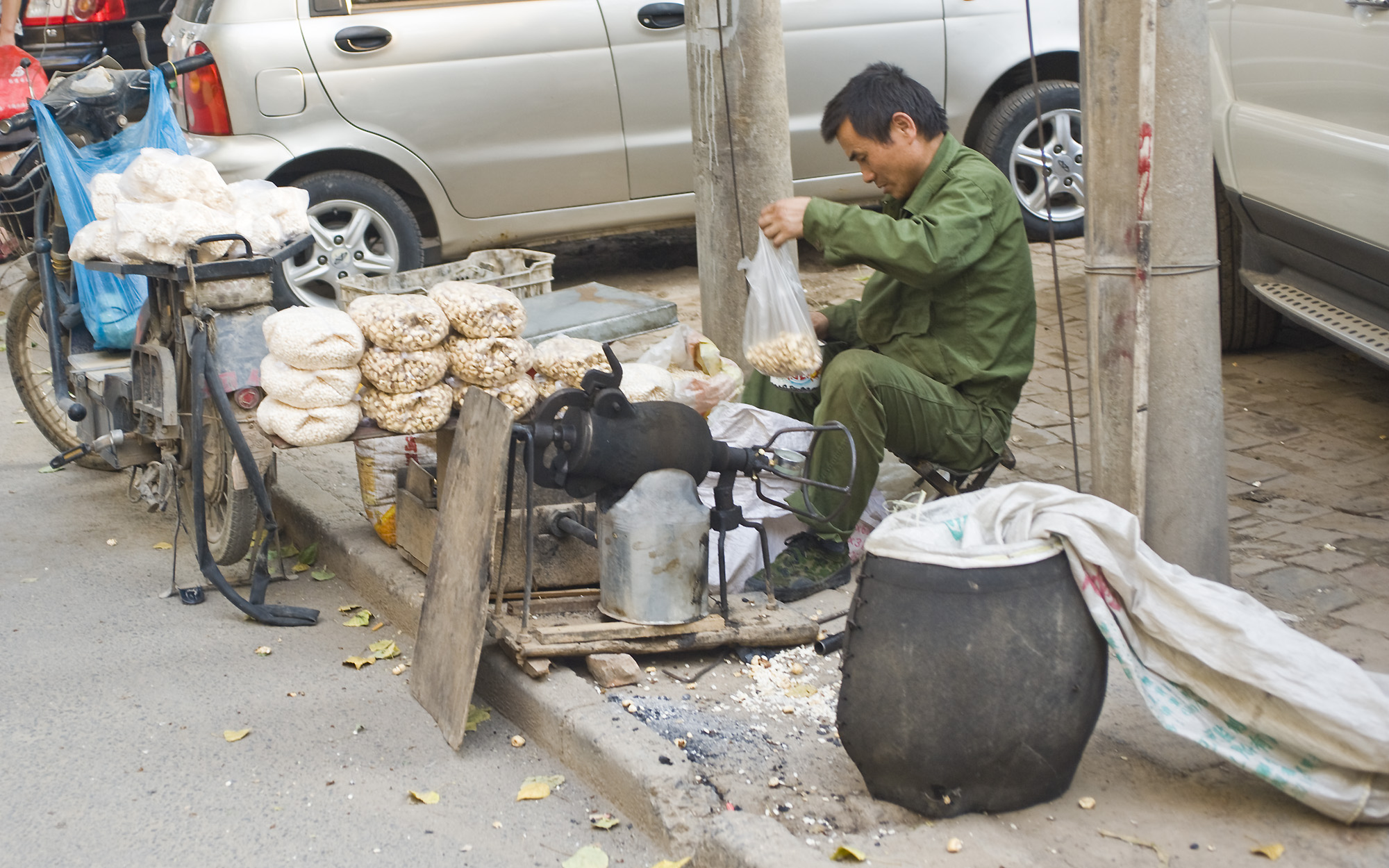
A popcorn "cannon" seen in Taiyuan, China

The popcorn cannon, also called the Chinese popcorn maker, is an antiquated way of making popcorn in Asia, especially in China during the late 20th century. The device is a teardrop-shaped container that can contain various grains and accumulates pressure when heated. After hitting the lever on its opening, air will immediately flow in and puff the grain inside, making the contents shoot out. Although the device was ubiquitously associated with China, including in popular media, the origin of the device is largely disputed and unverifiable.

According to University of Hong Kong researcher Xiaomeng Liu and Chinese media, the earliest form of popcorn cannon was invented by American botanist Alexander P. Anderson. Anderson experimented with heating corn starch using glass in 1901 and subsequently developed a device capable of puffing grain, which was then revealed by Anderson at the St. Louis World's Fair in 1904. Anderson used the invention to puff rice, which the Quaker Oats Company eventually bought to make puffed rice as breakfast cereal. Anderson's invention was designed for industrial use, thus making it unsuitable for street vendors. The technology was likely spread to other European countries around World War I to improve the longevity of food under difficult conditions. In the 1940s, Yoshimura Toshiko (吉村利子) heard German people were using old cannons to puff grain; thus, she designed a portable grain-puffing device called Pongashi ki (ポン菓子機) in 1944 to 1945.

However, her invention is unrelated to the Chinese popcorn cannon popularized in the late 20th century, which was observed in China in the 1930s and photographed by Scottish missionary couple Ian and Rachel Morrison in 1938, years before Yoshimura completed her invention. It's unknown how portable popcorn cannons were introduced to China in the 1930s, and the prevalence of such devices. Another photo in China showed the machine under inspection by an American officer in a military supply factory in Chongqing. As similar machines were introduced to South Korea by the United States in the 1950s, Xiaomeng Liu theorized that the portable popcorn cannon was likely invented in the United States and subsequently introduced to East Asian countries. However, there is no definitive proof available.

== Variants ==
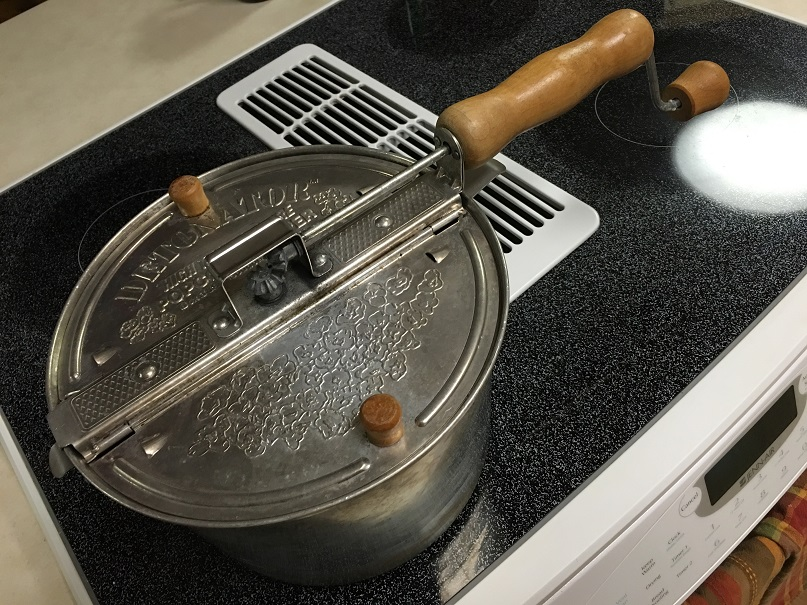
The Detonator stove-top popcorn popper

Some stovetop popcorn makers, such as The Detonator, Whirley Pop, Theater II, and Sweet & Easy, consist of a pot with a hand-cranked stirring blade. This prevents burning the kernels on the bottom and, under limited conditions, enables users to make sweetened popcorn by mixing sugar directly with the kernels before they pop. Other stovetop popcorn makers, such as the Atom Pop and the Apollo Popper, have a very small surface area at the bottom, which forces the popped kernels away from the heat without any agitation or stirring.

In 1978, Presto introduced the Popcorn Pumper, a popper for home use that used hot air blown up through the kernels. Cooking without oil reduces the calories and fat in the finished product. It was also faster and easier than pan fry popping.

Other home popcorn makers are also available and consist of an electrically heated circular tray with a motorized stirring arm, into which corn and oil can be placed, and a dome-shaped cover that often doubles as a serving bowl.

Around 1974, Pillsbury made microwave popcorn available for sale in vending machines; as microwave oven sales increased, the product was released to supermarkets. This reduced the need for a separate kitchen appliance, and more consumers now buy microwave popcorn bags than use home machines. To improve flavor, texture, and shelf life of pre-packaged microwave popcorn, companies started adding diacetyl, PFOA, and trans-fats to the packages, which has led to concern among health-conscious consumers.

== Gallery ==
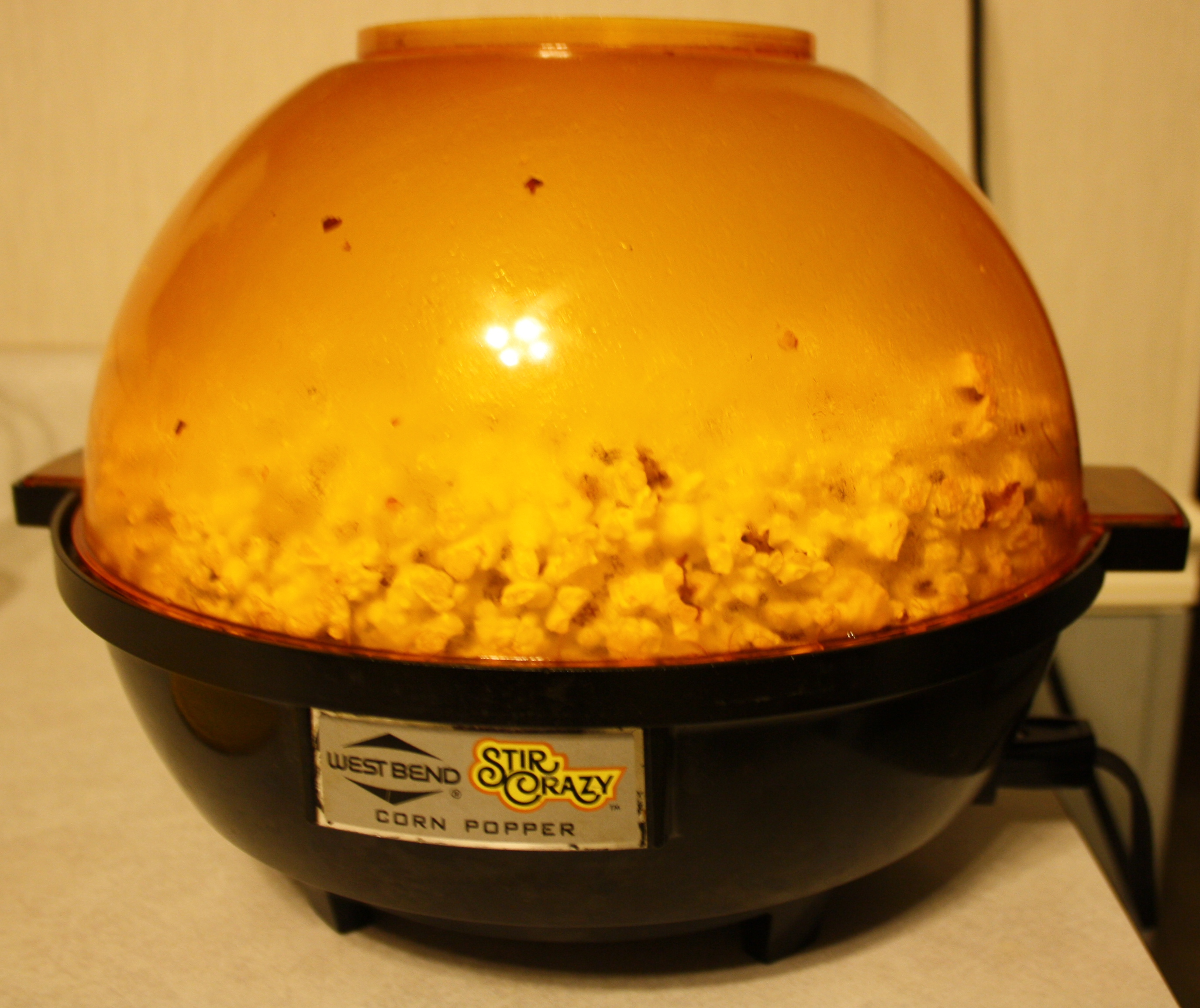
Stir Crazy popcorn popper

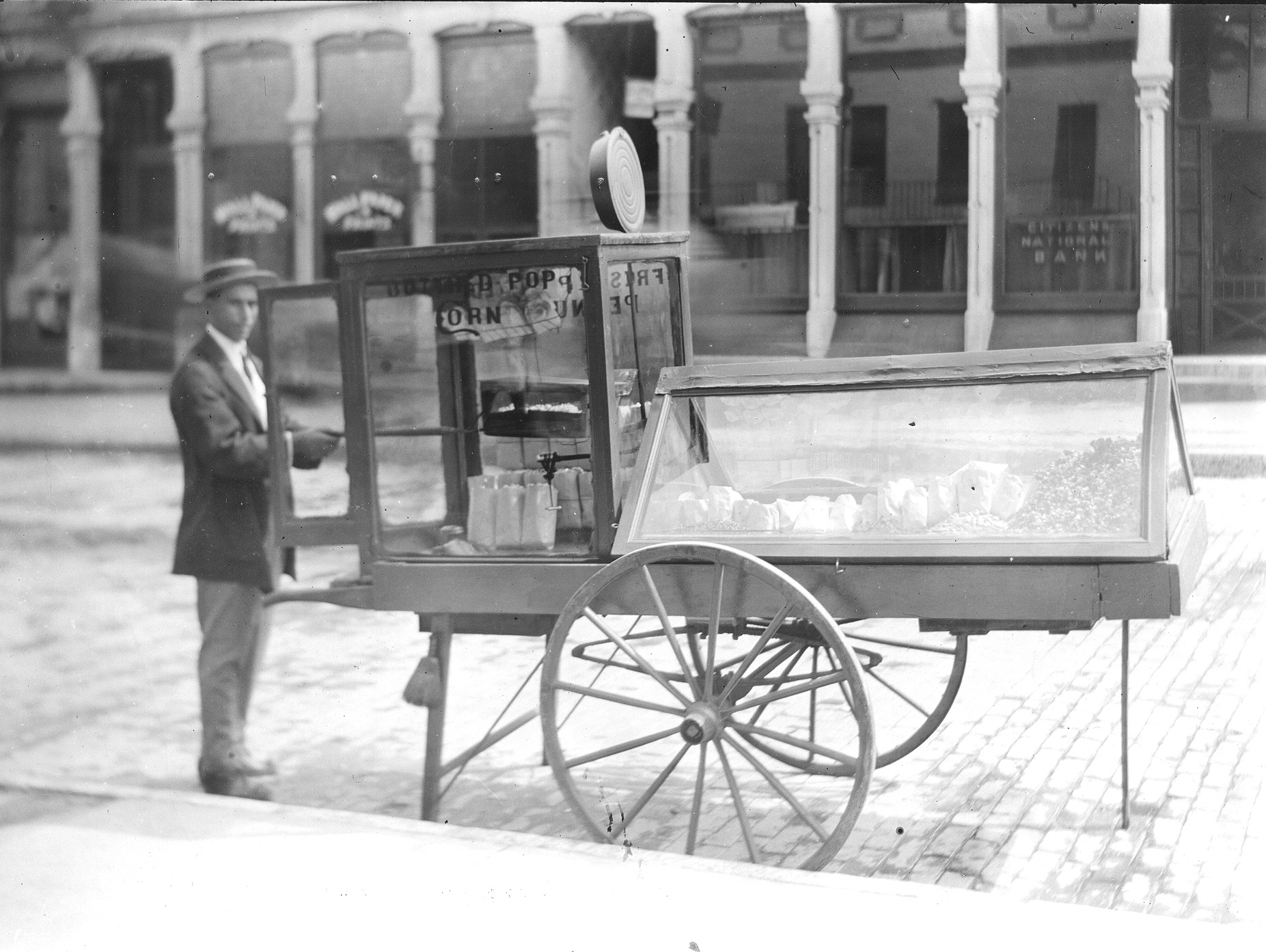
Popcorn vendor at Paris, Illinois, on August 3, 1912

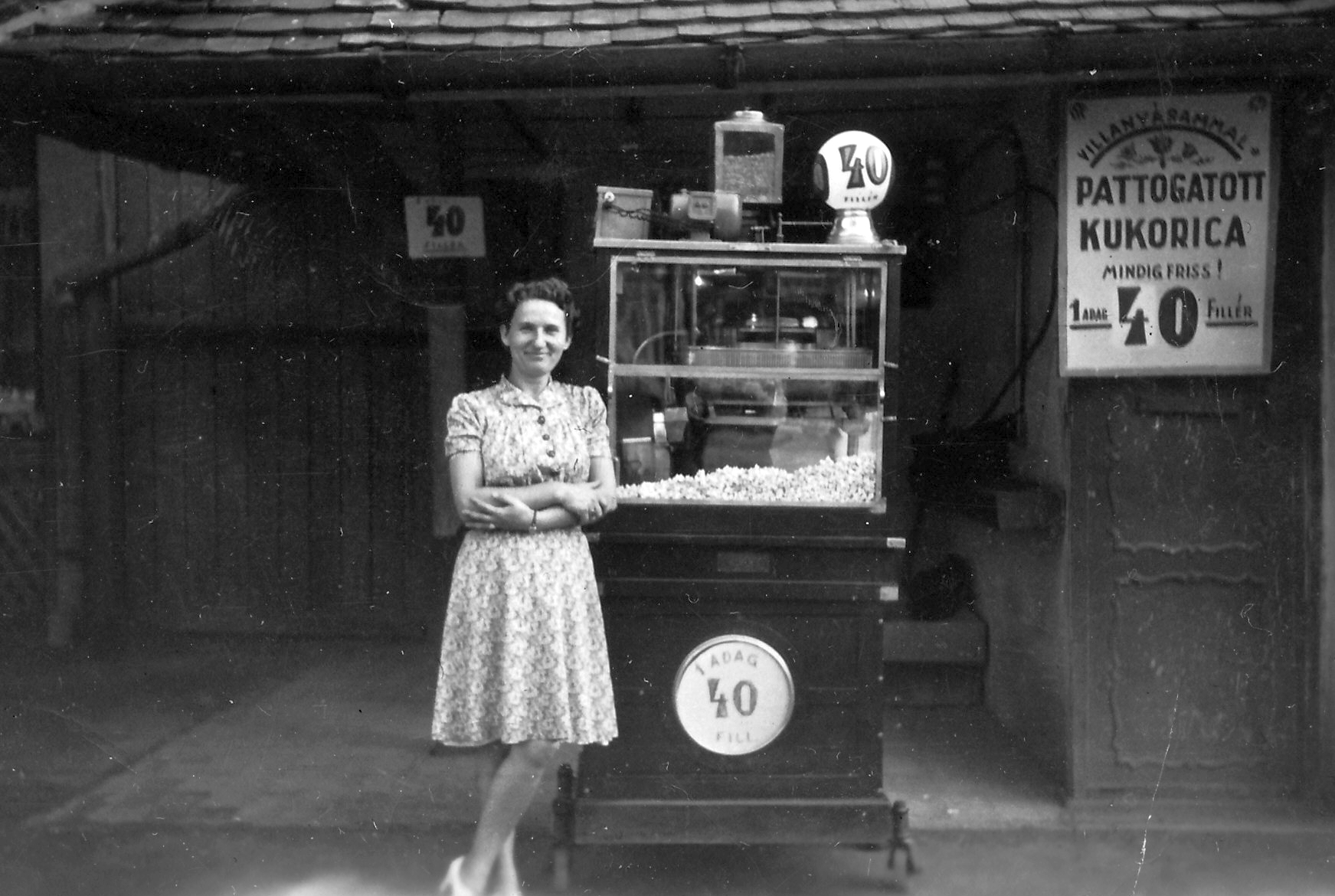
Commercial popcorn maker in the 1940s.

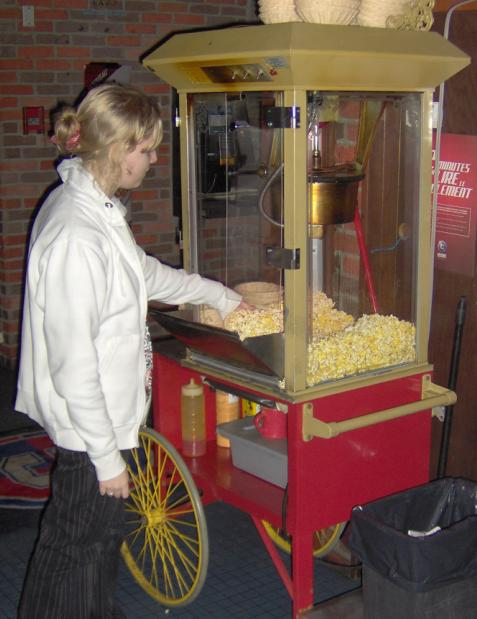
Modern vending cart

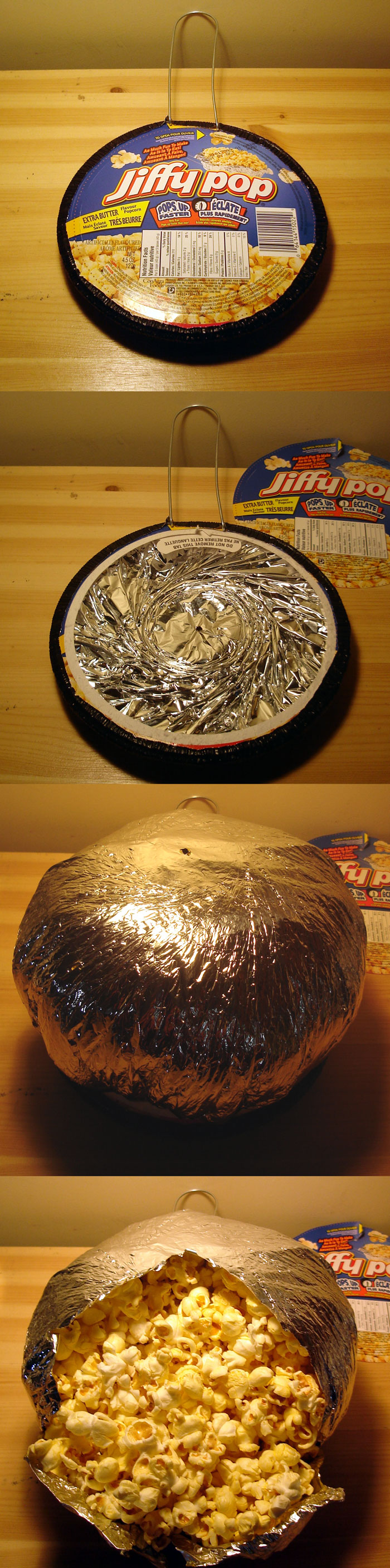
Jiffy Pop popcorn, single-use

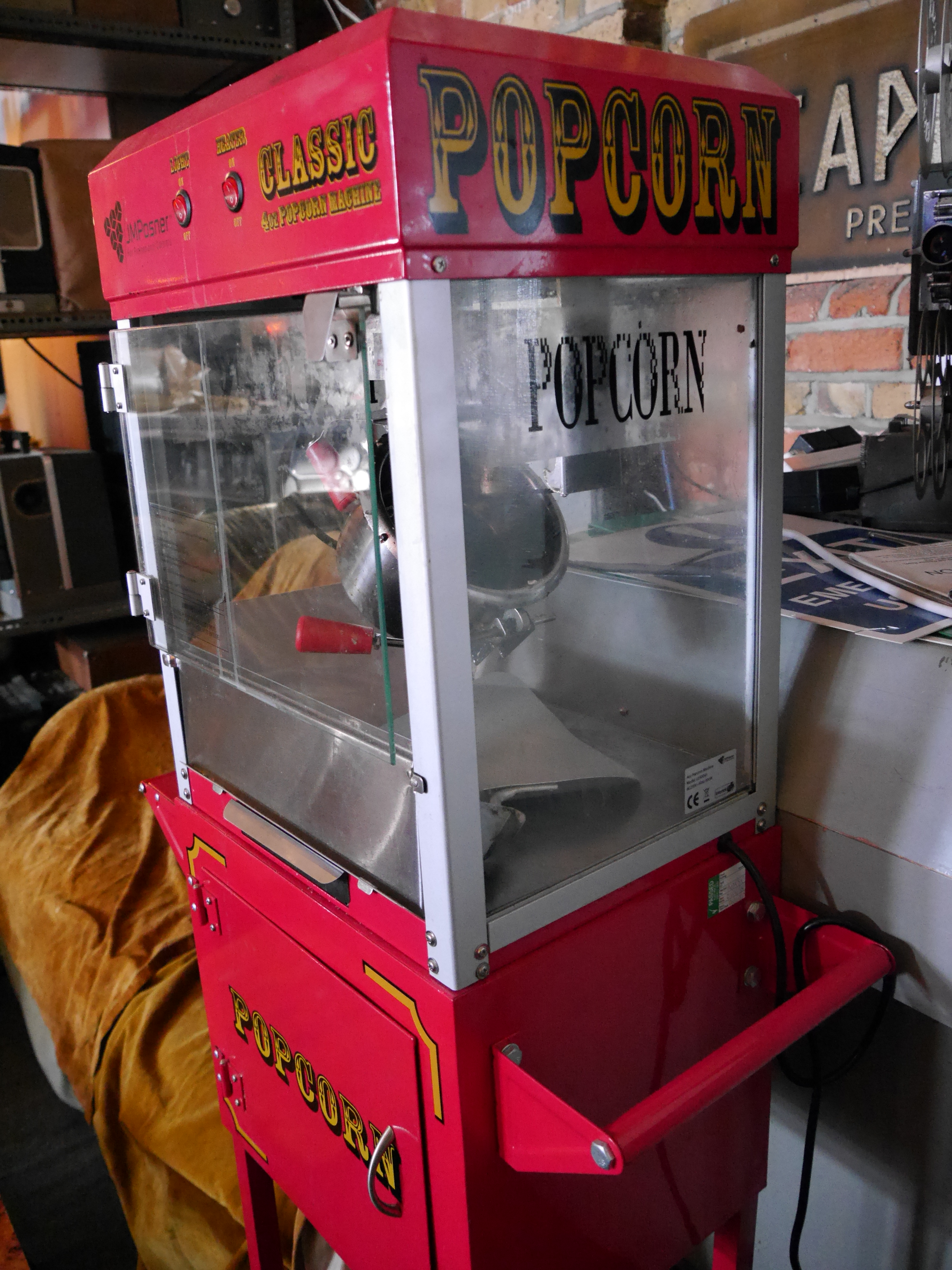
Old movie theater popcorn machine, Cinema Museum (London)

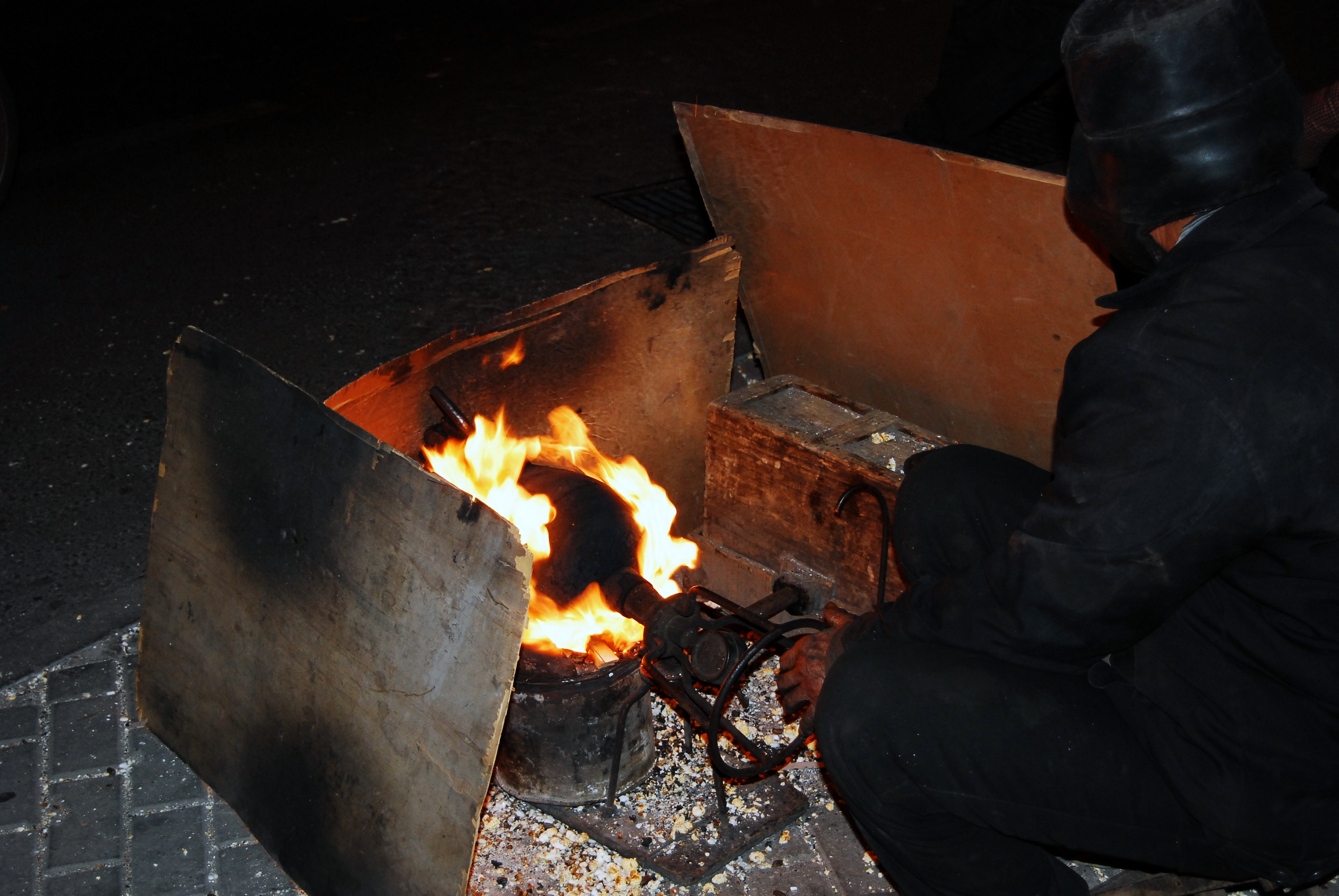
Making popcorn using the "popcorn cannon"

== See also ==
- National Presto Industries
- Jiffy Pop
- Home roasting coffee
