= Cretors =

American manufacturing company

C. Cretors & Co.
- Industry: Manufacturing, concessions, food processing equipment, popcorn, popcorn makers
- Founded: Chicago (1885)
- Founder: Charles Cretors
- Headquarters: Wood Dale, Illinois, United States
- Key people: Charles D. Cretors, CEO; Andrew Cretors, President
- Divisions: Echols, Flo-thru
- Website: http://www.cretors.com

C. Cretors & Company is an American manufacturing company, specializing in popcorn machines and other concessions equipment. It was established in 1885 with the invention of the first large-scale commercial popcorn machine to pop corn in oil. C. Cretors & Co. is in Wood Dale, Illinois and is still owned by the Cretors family.

== History ==
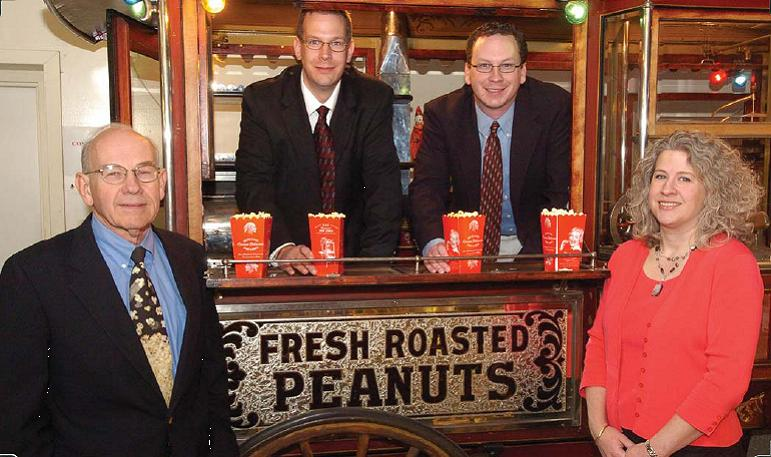
Charles D. Cretors, Bud Cretors, Andrew Cretors, and Beth Cretors

=== 1880s through 1890s ===
Charles Cretors (1852–1934) was originally from Lebanon, Ohio, but eventually made his way to Decatur, Illinois, where he opened a bakery and eventually a confectionery shop. He purchased a peanut roaster for his shop to broaden his product line to include freshly roasted peanuts. Not satisfied with the new machine, he redesigned it for better function. He moved to Chicago seeking success by selling his new machine. He purchased a vendor's license to test his machine in front of his shop. The license, dated December 2, 1885, marks the inception of C. Cretors & Co.

The new roaster was driven by a small steam engine, which automated the roasting process. By 1893, Cretors had created a steam powered machine that could roast peanuts as well as popcorn in oil. Cretors' machine design offered several advantages over the hand-operated process. Cretors’ machine became the first automated machine that could pop popcorn uniformly in its own seasonings. As a result, the product was uniform every time. Cretors applied for a patent on his automated peanut roaster and popcorn maker, which was granted in 1893.

A chance meeting happened between Cretors and J. M. Savage, a traveling salesman who purchased a bag of roasted peanuts. Savage was intrigued with the new peanut roaster and offered to sell it in his territory. Cretors agreed to the proposal, and hired his first salesman.

Charles Cretors took his new popcorn wagon to the Midway of Chicago's Columbian Exposition in 1893 and introduced the new corn product. After a trial period where Cretors gave away samples of his new popcorn product, people lined up to purchase bags of the hot, buttered popcorn. The smell of roasting peanuts and of hot buttered corn being popped in its seasoning before the buyers' attracted attention and sales.

=== 1900s through 1930s ===
By 1900, Cretors introduced the Special, the first large horse-drawn popcorn wagon. It was an immediate success. Three variations of this wagon were created. This was when electricity was becoming available. Cretors created the first popcorn machine with an electric motor. Thus, C. Cretors and Company holds one of the oldest active Underwriters Laboratories numbers (EA175) for electrically operated machinery. The electric poppers soon took to market and electricity became the choice of power, as steam power had a reputation for being complicated and dangerous.

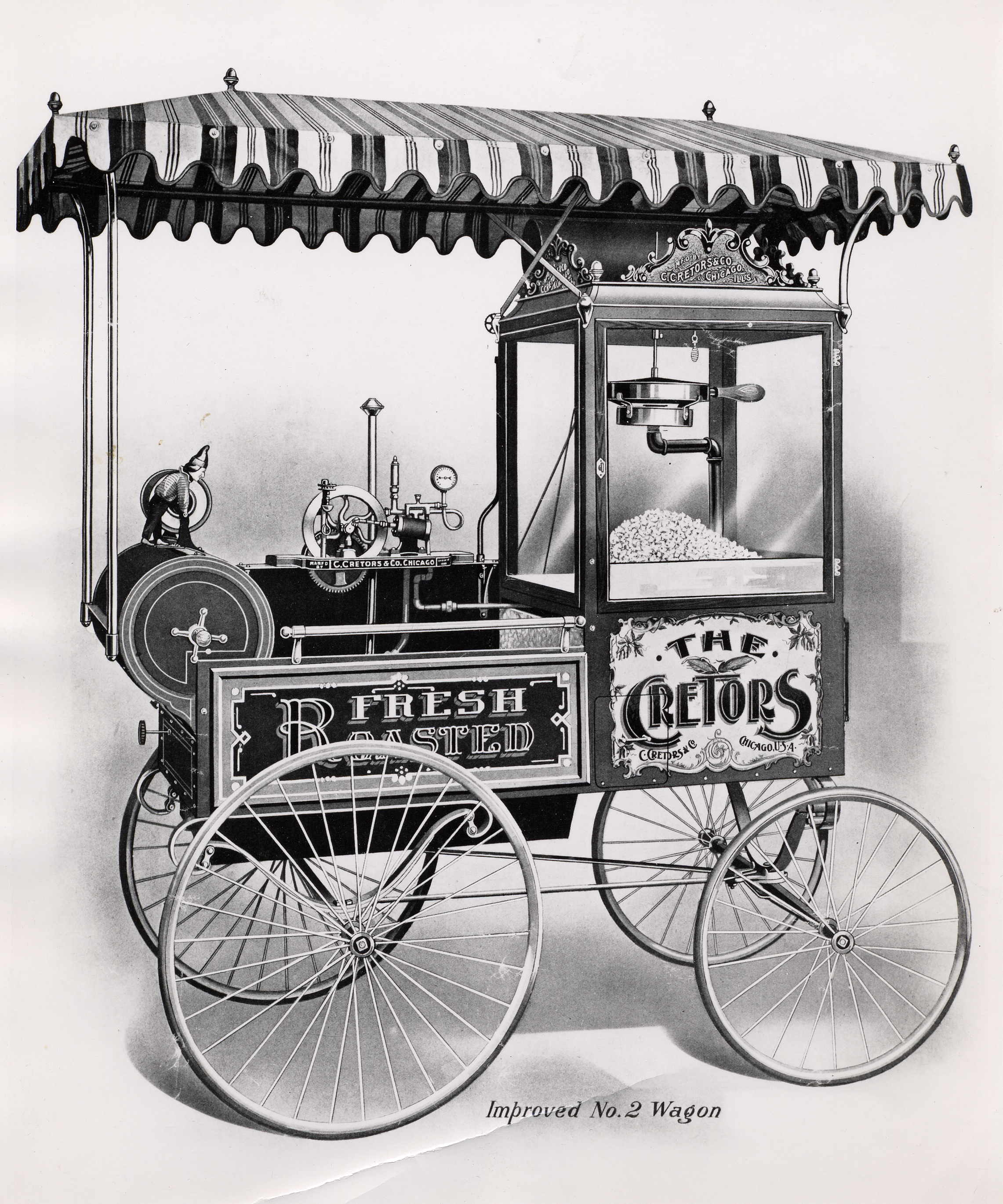
Lithograph of Cretors' "Improved No. 2 Wagon"

As movie theater attendance grew through the 1920s, Cretors began designing machines that could pop and hold more of the product. Popcorn continued to grow in popularity through the Great Depression due to its low cost.

=== During World War II ===
C. Cretors and Company adapted when faced with World War II. In 1941 the War Production Board issued L-65, stopping all non-war-related production. Cretors became a government supplier in the war effort. Cretors purchased new production equipment and produced aircraft oil line fittings and mechanical radio components, among other things. After the war, the company faced a shortage of materials. Cretors introduced the Super 60, a popcorn machine with an all walnut cabinet. Since then they have continued designing new poppers and features to meet the new needs of theaters, concession stands, and customers.

=== Further expansion ===
Cretors has continued to expand their product line to include other food service equipment including warming cabinets, expanded topping and dispensing systems, hot dog, nacho cheese, and caramelizing and nut roasting equipment.

== Product lines ==
- Small concessions poppers
- Large concessions poppers
- Display and Cornditioner cabinets
- Gourmet retail equipment
- Topping and dispensers
- Hot dog equipment
- Cotton candy
- Ice shavers

== In popular culture and the media ==
On July 7, 1988, the United States Postal Service issued a 16.7 cent postage stamp that featured an illustration of the Cretors 1902 Model of the No. 1 Wagon. It was issued as part of the transportation series. It was done to pay tribute to America's first snack and the machine that made it all possible.

Cretors has been featured on the Travel Channel's TV show Made in America, as well as Big, in which they manufactured the Guinness World Record's largest popcorn machine.
