= Dry roasting =

Food preparation method

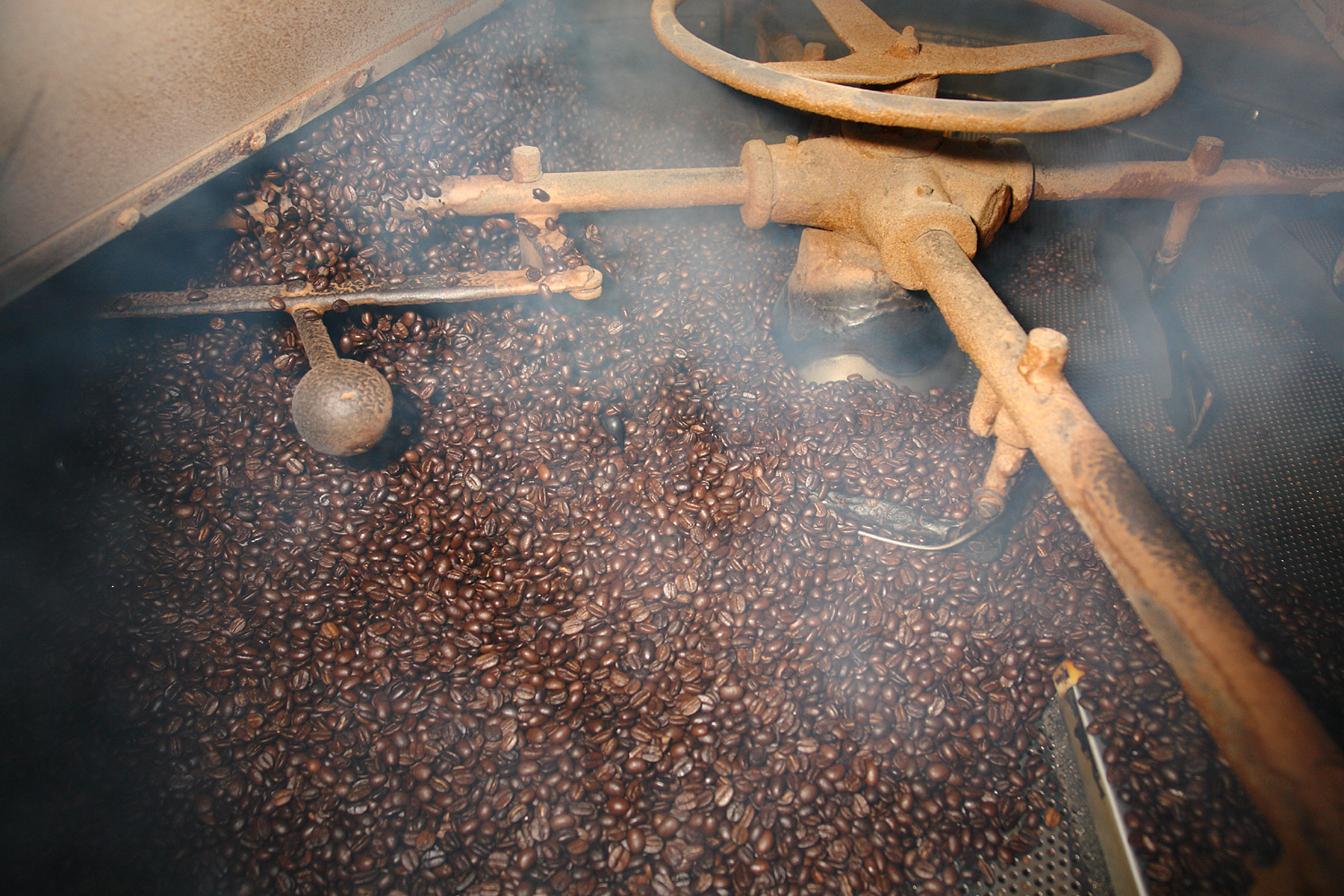
Coffee beans being roasted

Dry roasting is a process by which heat is applied to dry foodstuffs in a cooking vessel, without the use of oil or water as a carrier. Dry-roasted foods are stirred as they are roasted to ensure even heating. Unlike other dry heat methods, such as spit-roasting, dry roasting can be used with foods such as nuts and seeds, and with eaten insects such as house crickets.

Dry roasting can be done in a frying pan or wok (a common way to prepare spices in some cuisines), or in a specialized roaster (as is used for coffee beans or peanuts). Dry roasting changes the chemistry of proteins in the food, changing their flavor, and enhancing the scent and taste of some spices. Roasted spices are commonly prepared by adding various herbs, spices, and sugars to the frying pan and roasting until brown.

Common dry-roasted foods include peanut butter, which is made from peanuts that have been dry roasted; tea, which is made from tea leaves that have been dry-roasted (either immediately after picking or after fermentation); and coffee and chocolate, which are made from roasted coffee beans and roasted cocoa beans, respectively.

== See also ==
- Coffee roasting
