= Coffee roasting =

Process of heating green coffee beans

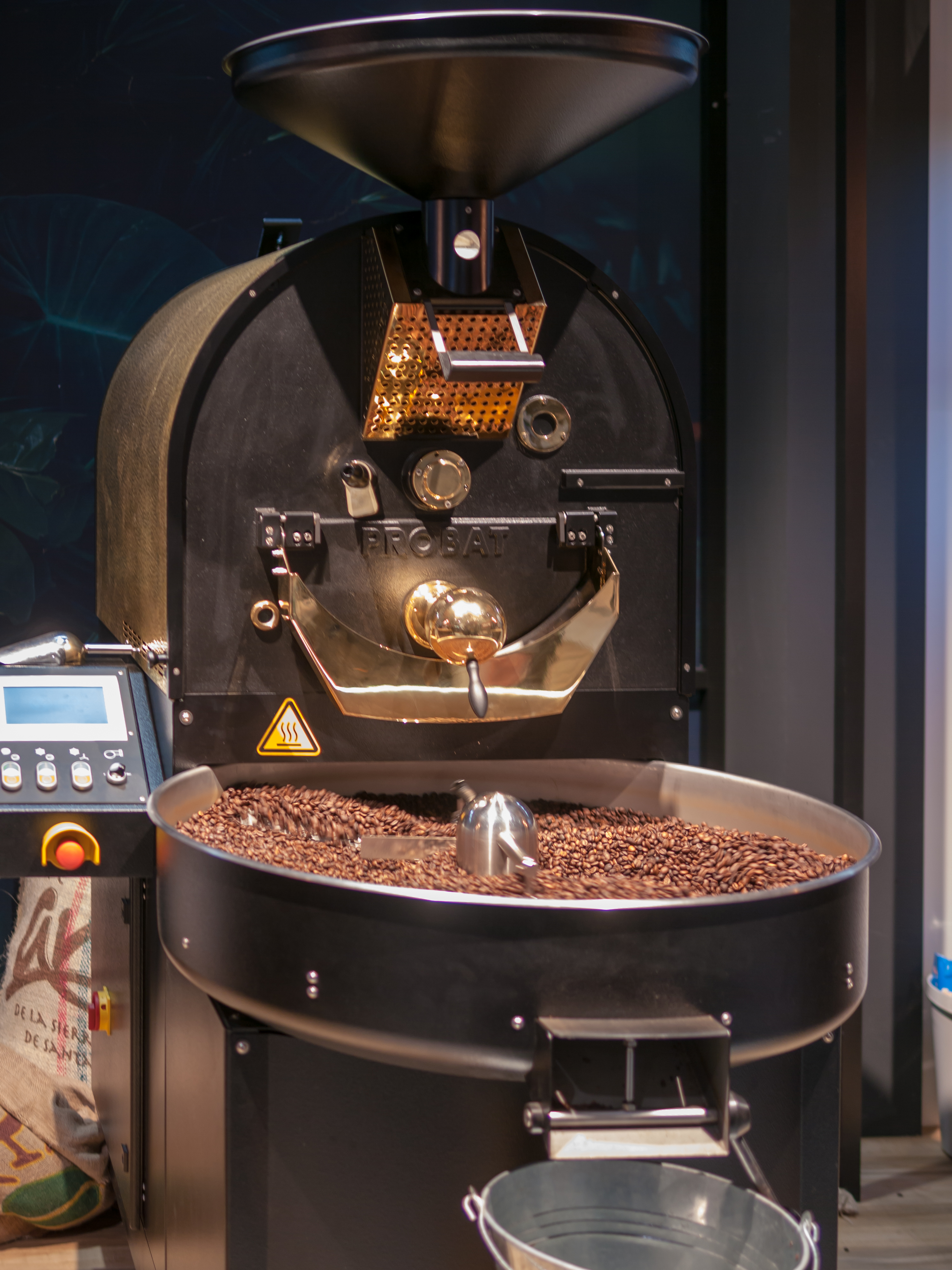
Professional coffee roasting machine

The sound of a coffee roaster

Roasted coffee beans are cooled and cleaned.

Roasting coffee transforms the chemical and physical properties of green coffee beans into roasted coffee products. The roasting process produces the characteristic flavor of coffee by causing the green coffee beans to change in taste. Unroasted beans contain similar if not higher levels of acids, protein, sugars, and caffeine as those that have been roasted, but lack the taste of roasted coffee beans due to the Maillard and other chemical reactions which occur during roasting.

Coffee tends to be roasted close to where it will be consumed, as green coffee is more stable than roasted beans. The vast majority of coffee is roasted commercially on a large scale, but small-scale commercial roasting has grown significantly with the trend toward "single-origin" coffees served at specialty shops. Some coffee drinkers roast coffee at home as a hobby in order to both experiment with the flavor profile of the beans and to ensure the freshest possible roasted coffee.

== History ==
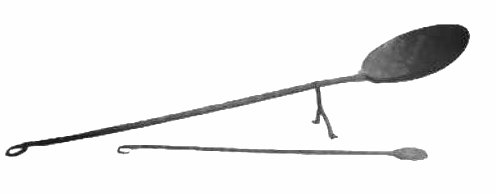
15th-century coffee roasting pan and stirring spoon from Baghdad

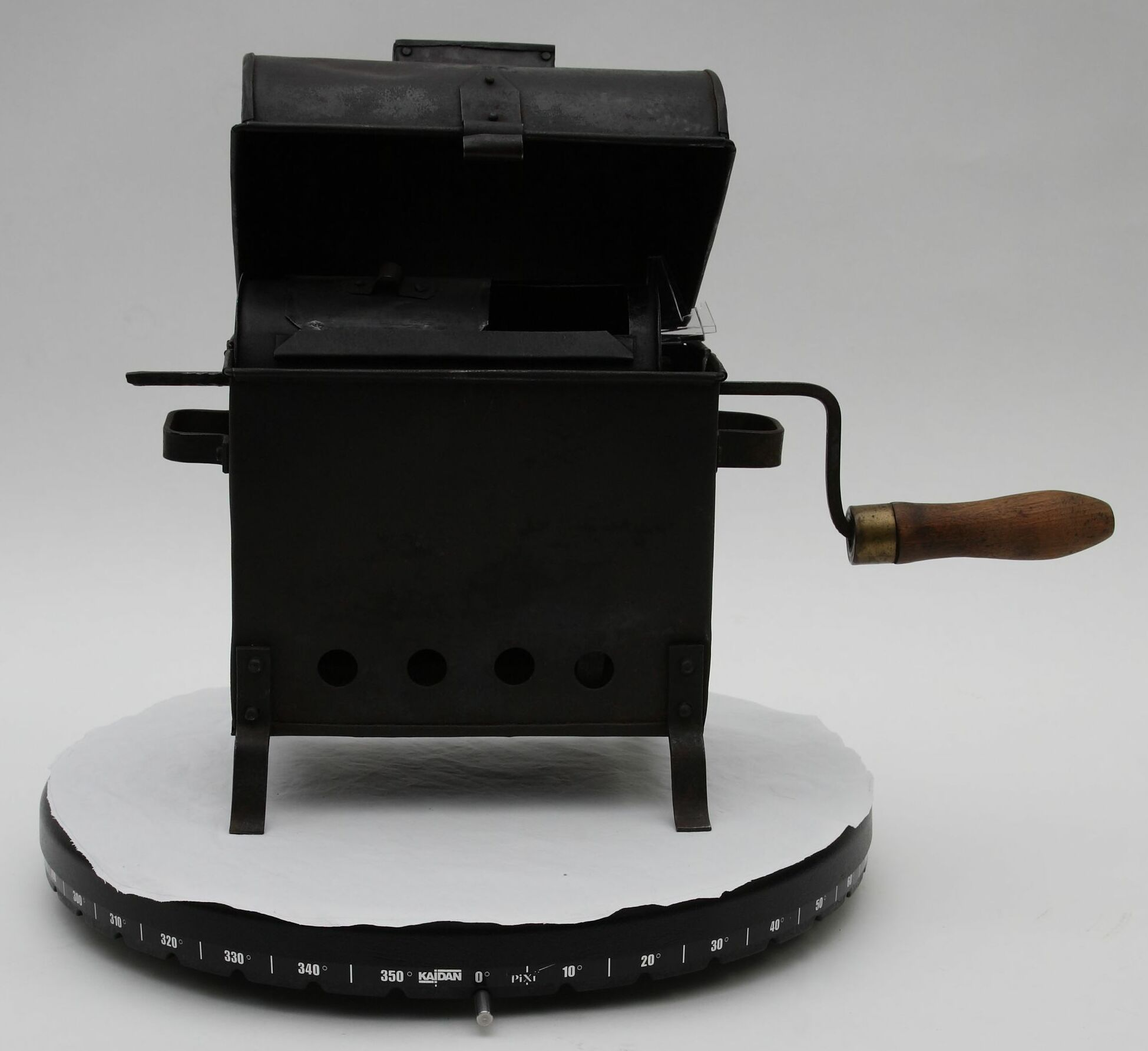
Free standing tin coffee roaster

Historical sources indicate that coffee beans were already being deliberately roasted as part of beverage preparation in Yemen by the 15th century, where Arab communities developed roasting and boiling techniques that distinguished coffee from earlier raw or food-based uses of the plant.

The earliest surviving roasting implements were thin, circular, often perforated pans made from metal or porcelain, used in the 15th century in the Ottoman Empire and Greater Persia. This type of shallow, dished pan was equipped with a long handle so that it could be held over a brazier (a container of hot coals) until the coffee was roasted. The beans were stirred with a slender spoon. Only a small amount of beans could be heated at one time. The first cylinder roaster with a crank to keep the beans in motion appeared in Cairo around 1650. It was made of metal, most commonly tinned copper or cast iron, and was held over a brazier or open fire. French, Dutch and Italian variations of this design quickly appeared. These proved popular over the next century in Europe, England and the American colonies.

In the 19th century, various patents were awarded in the U.S. and Europe for commercial roasters, to allow for large batches of coffee. Nevertheless, home roasting continued to be popular. A man working at a commercial roasting plant beginning in the 1850s in St. Louis, Missouri, said "selling roasted coffee was up-hill work, as everyone roasted coffee in the kitchen oven." Appliances catering to the home roaster were developed; in 1849 a spherical coffee roaster was invented in Cincinnati, Ohio, for use on the top of a wood-fired kitchen stove, fitted into a burner opening. Green beans were available at the local general store, or even through mail order. For roasting, many people used such simple methods as a layer of beans on a metal sheet in the oven, or beans stirred in a cast-iron skillet over a fire. Despite the wide popularity of home roasting, Burns felt that it would soon disappear because of the great strides made in commercial roasting in the 1860s and 1870s, not least because of the benefits of the economies of scale. The commercial roaster inventions patented by Burns revolutionized the U.S. roasting industry, much like the innovations in Emmerich am Rhein greatly advanced commercial coffee roasting in Germany. A 1864 marketing breakthrough of the Arbuckle Brothers in Philadelphia introduced the convenient one-pound (0.45 kg) paper bag of roasted coffee, which brought success and imitators. From that time commercially roasted coffee grew in popularity until it gradually overtook home roasting during the early 1900s in America. In 1903 and 1906 the first electric roasters were patented in the U.S. and Germany, respectively; these commercial devices eliminated the problem of smoke or fuel vapor imparting a bad taste to the coffee. In France, home roasters did not yield to the commercial roaster until after the 1920s, especially in rural areas. Coffee was roasted to a dark color in small batches at home and by shopkeepers, using a variety of appliances including ones with a rotating cylinder of glass, sheet iron or wire mesh, and ones driven by hand, clockwork or electric motor. Because of the smoke and blowing chaff, country dwellers generally roasted outdoors.

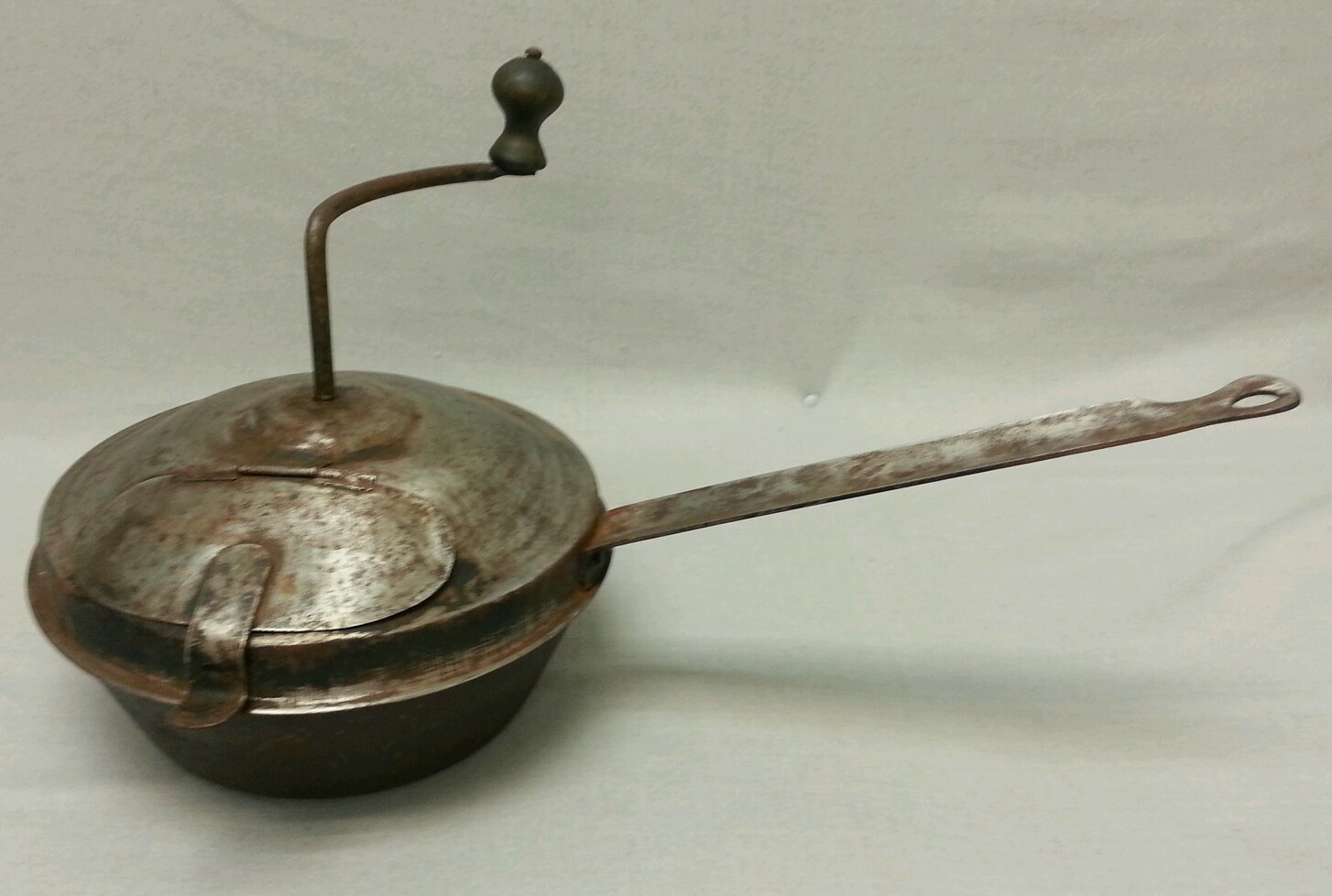
A hand-cranked wood stove top coffee roaster c. 1890–1910

In the 1950s just as instant coffee was becoming a popular coffee drink, speciality coffeehouses began opening to cater to the connoisseur, offering a more traditionally brewed beverage. In the 1970s, more speciality coffeehouses were founded, ones that offered a variety of roasts and beans from around the world. In the 1980s and 1990s, the gourmet coffee industry experienced great growth. Through the 1970s and 1980s, the Siemens Sirocco home roaster was made in West Germany and marketed globally. It was a small fluid-bed roaster made for the home enthusiast. The product was named after a commercial hot-air roasting process which was named after the hot Sahara winds called sirocco. In 1976, chemical engineer Michael Sivetz patented a competing hot air design for manufacture in the U.S.; this became popular as an economical alternative. Sivetz called for the home roaster to focus on the quality of the bean. From 1986 through 1999 there was a surge in the number of patents filed for home roasting appliances. In the 1990s, more electric home roasting equipment became available, including drum roasters and variations on the fluid-bed roaster. By 2001, gourmet coffee aficionados were using the internet to purchase green estate-grown beans for delivery by mail.

== Process ==
The coffee-roasting process follows coffee processing and precedes coffee brewing. It consists essentially of sorting, roasting, cooling, and packaging but can also include grinding. Bags of green coffee beans are dumped into a hopper and screened to remove debris. The beans are then weighed and transferred manually, by belt, or pneumatic conveyor to storage hoppers. From the storage hoppers, the beans are conveyed to the roaster.

Initially, the process is endothermic (absorbing heat), but at around 175 °C (347 °F) it becomes exothermic (giving off heat). For the roaster, this means that the beans are heating themselves, and an adjustment of the roaster's heat source might be required. At the end of the roasting cycle, the roasted beans are dumped from the roasting chamber and are typically cooled by air or water-quenching.

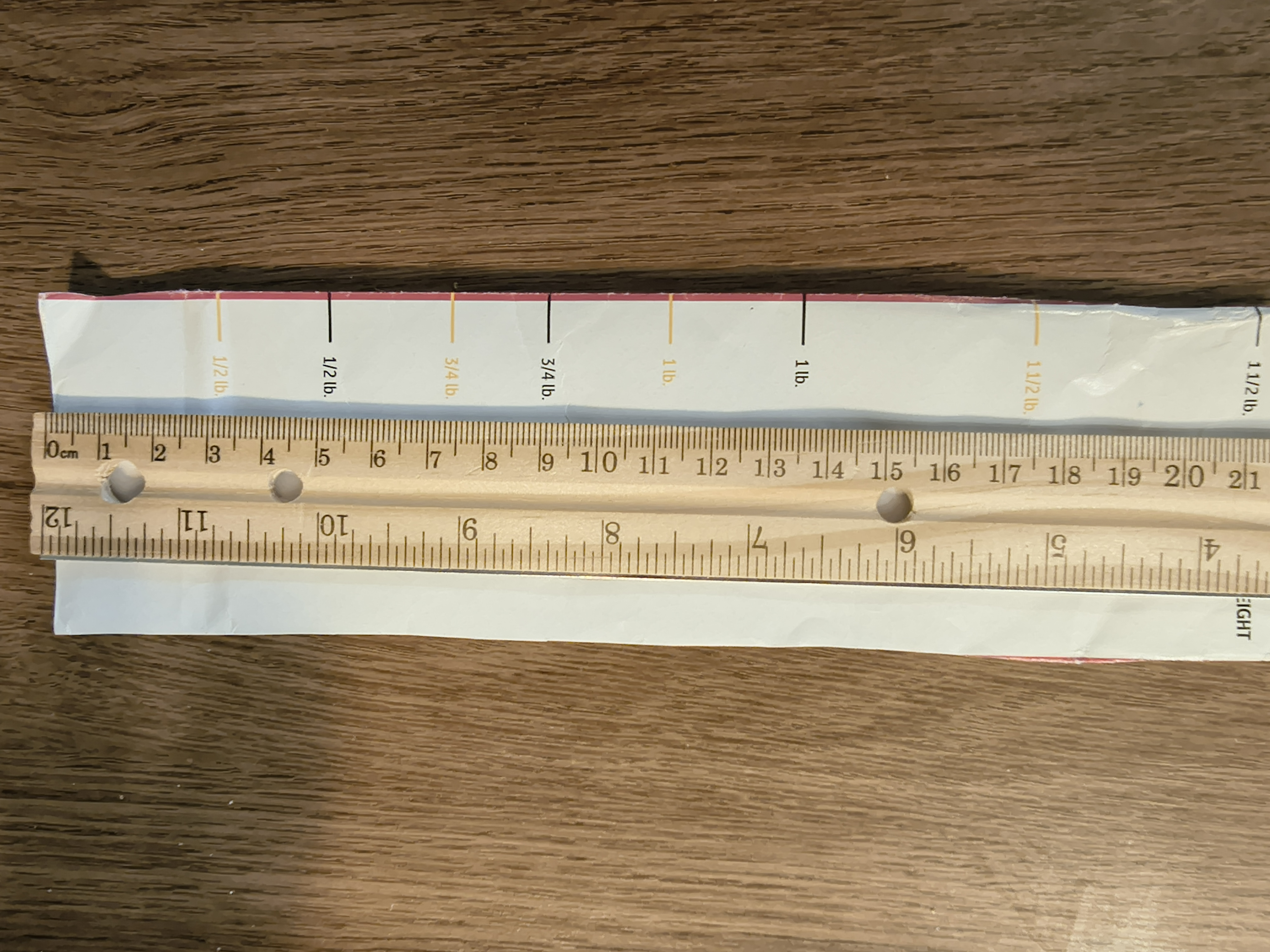
Red Brick Roasting Co. bag from WinCo showing the approximate volumes of light and dark coffee beans.

During the roasting process coffee beans lose 15 to 18% of their mass, due mainly to the loss of water but also of that of volatile compounds. Although the beans themselves lose weight, their volume approximately doubles due to the increase in internal pressure from vaporized water. Viz. Popcorn. Green coffee can contain reasonable quantities of simple sugars. Sugars are quite reactive at roasting temperatures and, once the water has evaporated out of the bean, the sugars can begin to react to the heat in different ways. Some go through caramelization reactions, creating the caramel notes found in certain coffees.

There are several traditional variations to coffee roasting in different parts of the world. For example, in Vietnam coffee is often coated with oil (traditionally clarified butter) and a small amount of sugar prior to roasting to produce a "butter roast". The roasting process results in an additional caramelized coating on the beans.

== Equipment ==
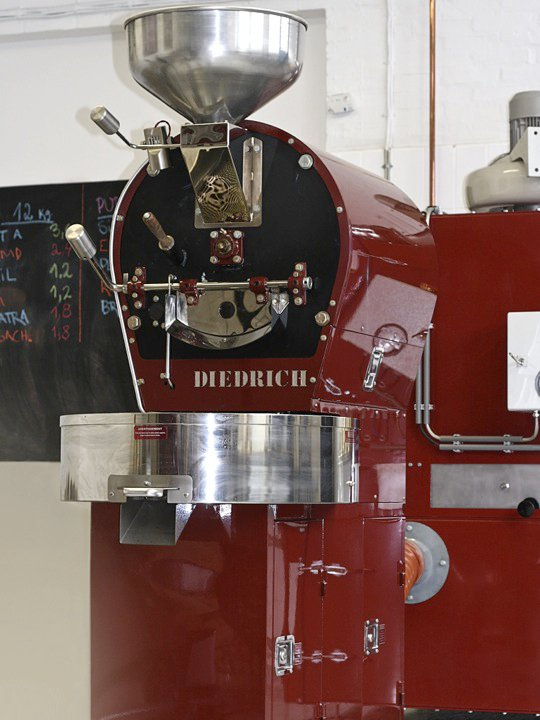
An infrared-heated drum-based coffee roaster

The most common roasting machines are of two basic types: drum and hot-air, although there are others including packed-bed, tangential and centrifugal roasters. Roasters can operate in either batch or continuous modes.

Drum machines consist of horizontal rotating drums that tumble the beans in a heated environment. The heat source can be supplied by natural gas, liquefied petroleum gas (LPG), electricity, or even wood. The most common employ indirectly heated drums where the heat source is under the drum. Direct-fired roasters are roasters in which a flame contacts the beans inside the drum; very few of these machines are still in operation. Fluid bed or hot-air roasters force heated air through a screen or perforated plate under the coffee beans with sufficient force to lift the beans. Heat is transferred to the beans as they tumble and circulate within this fluidized bed.

== Roasts ==
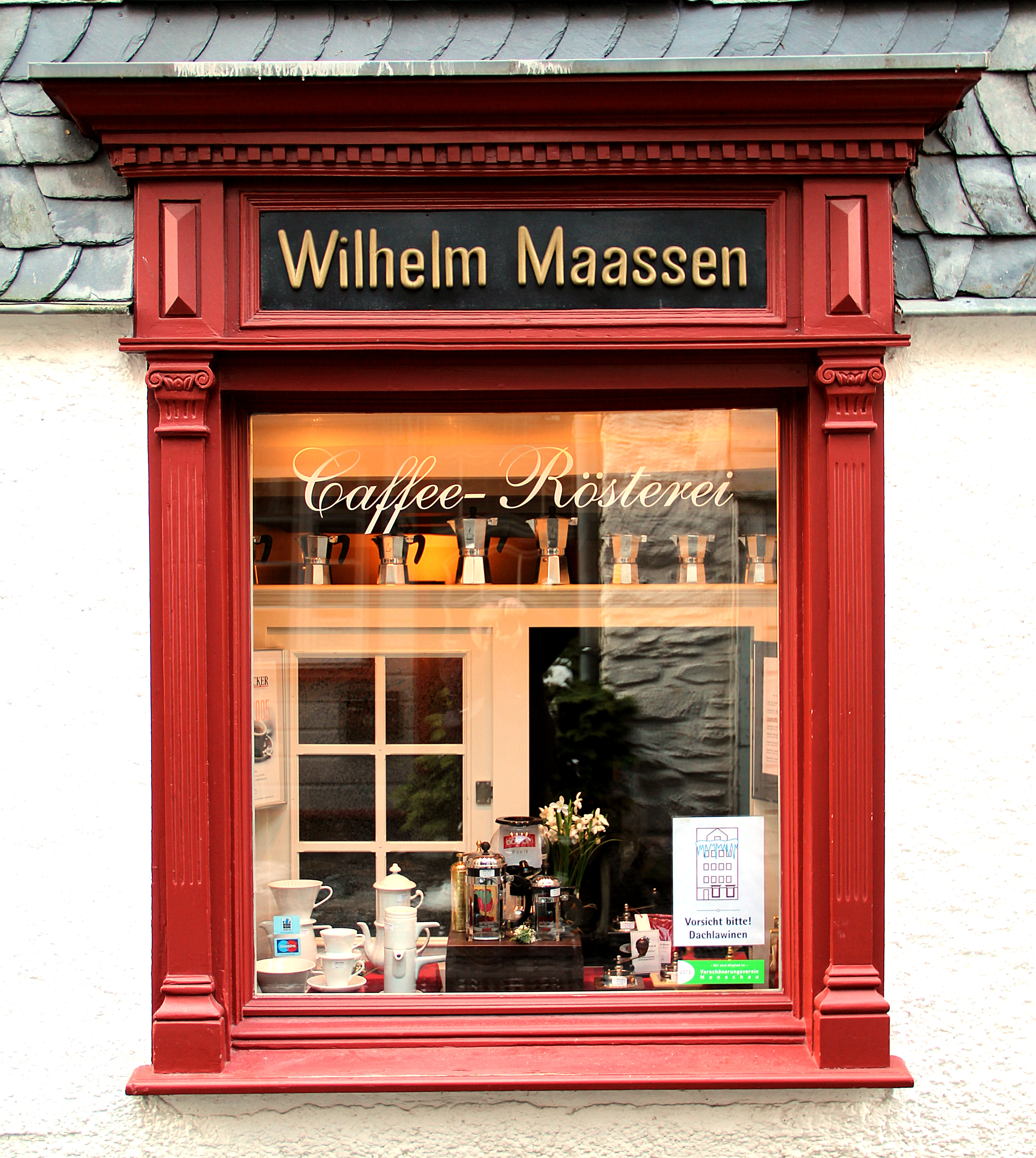
Window of a coffee-roasting shop in Monschau (Germany)

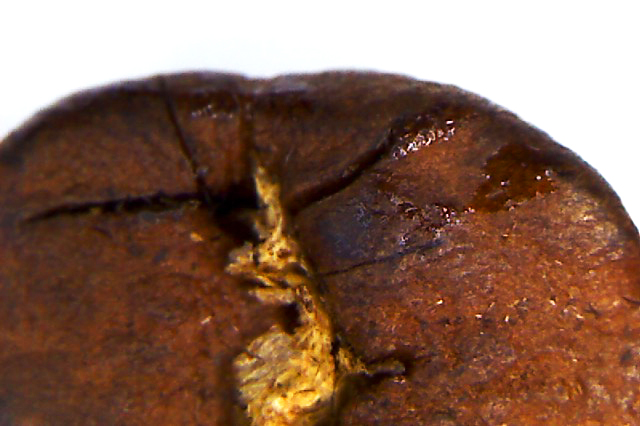
A magnified view of a roasted coffee bean showing some scorching and oil seepage

Some coffee roasters use names for the various degrees of roast, such as "city roast" and "French roast", for the internal bean temperatures found during roasting. Recipes known as "roast profiles" indicate how to achieve flavor characteristics. Any number of factors may help a person determine the best profile to use, such as the coffee's origin, variety, processing method, moisture content, bean density, or desired flavor characteristics. A roast profile can be presented as a graph showing time on one axis and temperature on the other, which can be recorded manually or using computer software and data loggers linked to temperature probes inside various parts of the roaster.

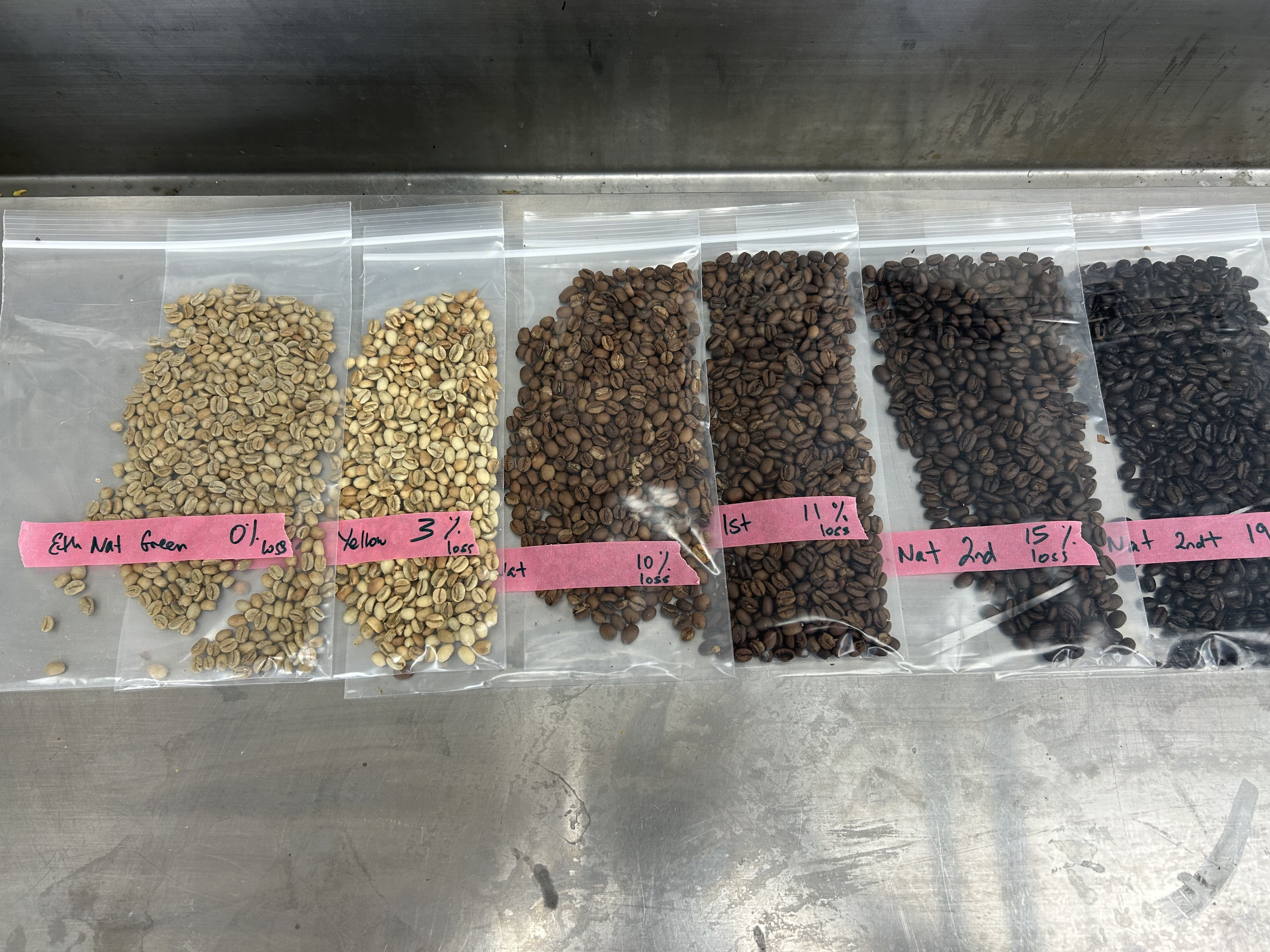
Color change in coffee beans during the roasting process

One method of determining the degree of roast is to evaluate the bean's color. As the coffee absorbs heat, the color shifts to yellow and then to increasingly darker shades of brown. During the later stages of roasting, oils appear on the surface of the bean. The roast will continue to darken until it is removed from the heat source. Coffee also darkens as it ages, making color alone a poor roast determinant. It is common for roasters to use a combination of temperature, smell, color, and sound to monitor the roasting process. The famous Italian roaster Gianni Frasi explains how artisanal roasting is fundamental in order to obtain a high quality coffee: "immersion in direct flame is purification, it makes a dead bean alive...the bean's dignity can only be guaranteed by an open flame." Also according to Frasi, the bean can be defined as perfectly toasted when it takes on a particular "friar's tunic" color nuance which can only be obtained in a precise instant of the process and which the craftsman must be able to grasp by sight. This particular coloring is proof that all the potential aromas of the green bean have been released. The craft system is codified by Italian author Luca Farinotti in his 2019 award-winning book World and restaurant.

There are two events called "cracks" that roasters listen for. At approximately 196 °C (385 °F), the beans will emit a cracking sound. This point is referred to as "first crack", marking the beginnings of a very light roast. At first crack, a large amount of the moisture has been evaporated, and the beans will begin to increase in size. When the beans reach approximately 224 °C (435 °F), they emit a "second crack". This sound represents the structure of the beans becoming brittle and fracturing as the bean continues to swell and enlarge from internal pressure. If the roast is allowed to progress further, it begins to take on the characteristics of the roasting process and loses the characteristics of the coffee's origin.

Lipids present inside the bean liquify from heat and pressure built up in the bean. These lipids can often be seen on the bean surface. An oily coating is more prevalent with darker roasts.

These images depict samples taken from the same batch of a typical Brazilian green coffee at various bean temperatures with their subjective roast names and descriptions.

=== Examples ===
Unroasted
22 °C (72 °F), Green Beans Green coffee beans as it arrives at the dock. The beans can be stored for approximately 12–18 months in a climate controlled environment before quality loss is noticeable.	165 °C (329 °F), Drying Phase During the drying phase the beans are undergoing an endothermic process until their moisture content is evaporated, noted as the yellowing phase.
Light Roast
196 °C (385 °F), Cinnamon Roast A very light roast level which is immediately noticeable at first crack. Sweetness is underdeveloped, with prominent toasted grain, grassy flavors, and sharp acidity.	205 °C (401 °F), New England Roast Moderate light brown, but still mottled in appearance. A preferred roast for some specialty roasters, highlights origin characteristics as well as complex acidity.
Medium Roast
210 °C (410 °F), American Roast Medium light brown, developed during first crack. Acidity is slightly muted, but origin character is still preserved.	219 °C (426 °F), City Roast Medium brown, common for most specialty coffee. Good for tasting origin character, although roast character is noticeable.
Dark Roast
225 °C (437 °F), Full City Roast Medium-dark brown with dry to tiny droplets or faint patches of oil, roast character is prominent. At the beginning of second crack, body is fully developed.	230 °C (446 °F), Vienna Roast Moderate dark brown with light surface oil, more bittersweet, caramel flavor, acidity muted. In the middle of second crack. Any origin characteristics have become eclipsed by roast at this level.
240 °C (464 °F), French Roast Dark brown, shiny with oil, deep caramel undertones, acidity diminished. At the end of second crack. Roast character is dominant, little of the inherent aroma or flavors of the coffee remain.	245 °C (473 °F), Italian Roast Nearly black and shiny, burnt tones become more distinct, acidity nearly eliminated, thin body.

=== Flavors ===
At lighter roasts, the coffee will exhibit more of its "origin character"—the flavors created by its variety, processing, altitude, soil content, and weather conditions in the location where it was grown. As the beans darken to a deep brown, the origin flavors of the bean are eclipsed by the flavors created by the roasting process. At darker roasts, the "roast flavor" is so dominant that it can be difficult to distinguish the origin of the beans used in the roast. Green coffee contains many different types of acids, some of which are pleasant to taste and some that are not. Of particular importance to the roaster are the chlorogenic acids (CGAs). One of the key goal of roasting is to break down these unpleasant acids.

Below, roast levels and their respective flavors are described. These are qualitative descriptions and thus subjective.

	Common roast names	Notes	Surface	Flavor
Light	Cinnamon Roast, American Roast, New England Roast, Half City Roast, Moderate-Light Roast	After several minutes the beans pop or crack and visibly expand in size. This stage is called first crack.	Dry	Lighter-bodied, higher acidity, no obvious roast flavor. Can contain grassy or fruity notes as beans are not roasted long after the first crack. This level of roast is ideal for tasting the full origin character of the coffee. Flavors do not coat the tongue for long periods of time at this roast level.
Medium	City roast, City+ Roast, Full City Roast	After being developed through first crack, the coffee reaches these roast levels.	Dry	Sugars have been further caramelized, and acidity has been muted. This results in coffee with higher body, but some roast flavor imposed. Flavors coat the tongue at this roast level but do not last long.
Dark	Full City+ Roast, Italian Roast, Vienna Roast, French Roast, Columbian Roast	After a few more minutes the beans begin popping again, and oils rise to the surface. This is called second crack.	Shiny. The level of oil correlates to how far the coffee is taken past second crack.	Full-bodied and bittersweet flavors are prominent, while aromas and flavors of roast become clearly evident. Little origin character remains. Flavors are likely to coat the tongue for long periods of time at this roast level.

Caffeine levels are not significantly affected by the level of roast. Caffeine remains stable up to 200 °C (392 °F) and completely decomposes around 285 °C (545 °F). Given that roasting temperatures do not exceed 200 °C (392 °F) for long and rarely if ever reach 285 °C (545 °F), the caffeine content of a coffee is not likely changed much by the roasting process. Despite this, and the common misconception that darker roasts contain more caffeine than lighter roasts, when beans are roasted they lose water and expand. As a result, when ground and measured by volume, a lighter roast will contain more caffeine than a less-dense darker roast.

== Home roasting ==
Home roasting is the process of roasting small batches of green coffee beans for personal consumption. Even after the turn of the 20th century, it was more common for at-home coffee drinkers to roast their coffee in their residence than it was to buy pre-roasted coffee. Later, home roasting faded in popularity with the rise of the commercial coffee roasting companies. In recent years home roasting of coffee has seen a revival. In some cases there is an economic advantage, but primarily it is a means to achieve finer control over the quality and characteristics of the finished product.

== Packaging ==
Extending the shelf life of roasted coffee relies on maintaining an optimum environment to protect it from exposure to heat, oxygen, and light. Roasted coffee has an optimal typical shelf life of two weeks, and ground coffee about 15 minutes. Without some sort of preservation method, coffee becomes stale. The first large-scale preservation technique was vacuum packing in cans. However, because coffee emits CO_{2} after roasting, coffee to be vacuum-packed must be allowed to de-gas for several days before it is sealed. To allow more immediate packaging, pressurized canisters or foil-lined bags with pressure-relief valves can be used. Refrigeration and freezing retards the staling process. Roasted whole beans can be considered fresh for up to one month if kept cool. Once coffee is ground it is best used immediately.

== Emissions and control ==
Particulate matter (PM), volatile organic compounds (VOC), organic acids, and combustion products are the principal emissions from coffee processing. Several operations are sources of PM emissions, including the cleaning and destoning equipment, roaster, cooler, and instant coffee drying equipment. The roaster is the main source of gaseous pollutants, including alcohols, aldehydes, organic acids, and nitrogen and sulfur compounds. Because roasters are typically heated by combustion of natural gas, carbon monoxide (CO) and CO_{2} emissions result from fuel combustion. Decaffeination and instant coffee extraction and drying operations may also be sources of small amounts of VOC. Emissions from the grinding and packaging operations typically are not vented to the atmosphere.

Particulate matter emissions from the roasting and cooling operations are typically ducted to cyclones before being emitted to the atmosphere. Gaseous emissions from roasting operations are typically ducted to a thermal oxidiser or thermal catalytic oxidiser following PM removal by a cyclone. Some facilities use the burners that heat the roaster as thermal oxidisers. However, separate thermal oxidisers are more efficient because the desired operating temperature is typically 650–816 °C (1,202–1,501 °F), which is 93–260 °C (199–500 °F) more than the maximum temperature of most roasters. Some facilities use thermal catalytic oxidizers, which require lower operating temperatures to achieve control efficiencies that are equivalent to standard thermal oxidisers. Catalysts are also used to improve the control efficiency of systems in which the roaster exhaust is ducted to the burners that heat the roaster. Emissions from spray dryers are typically controlled by a cyclone followed by a wet scrubber.

== Gallery ==
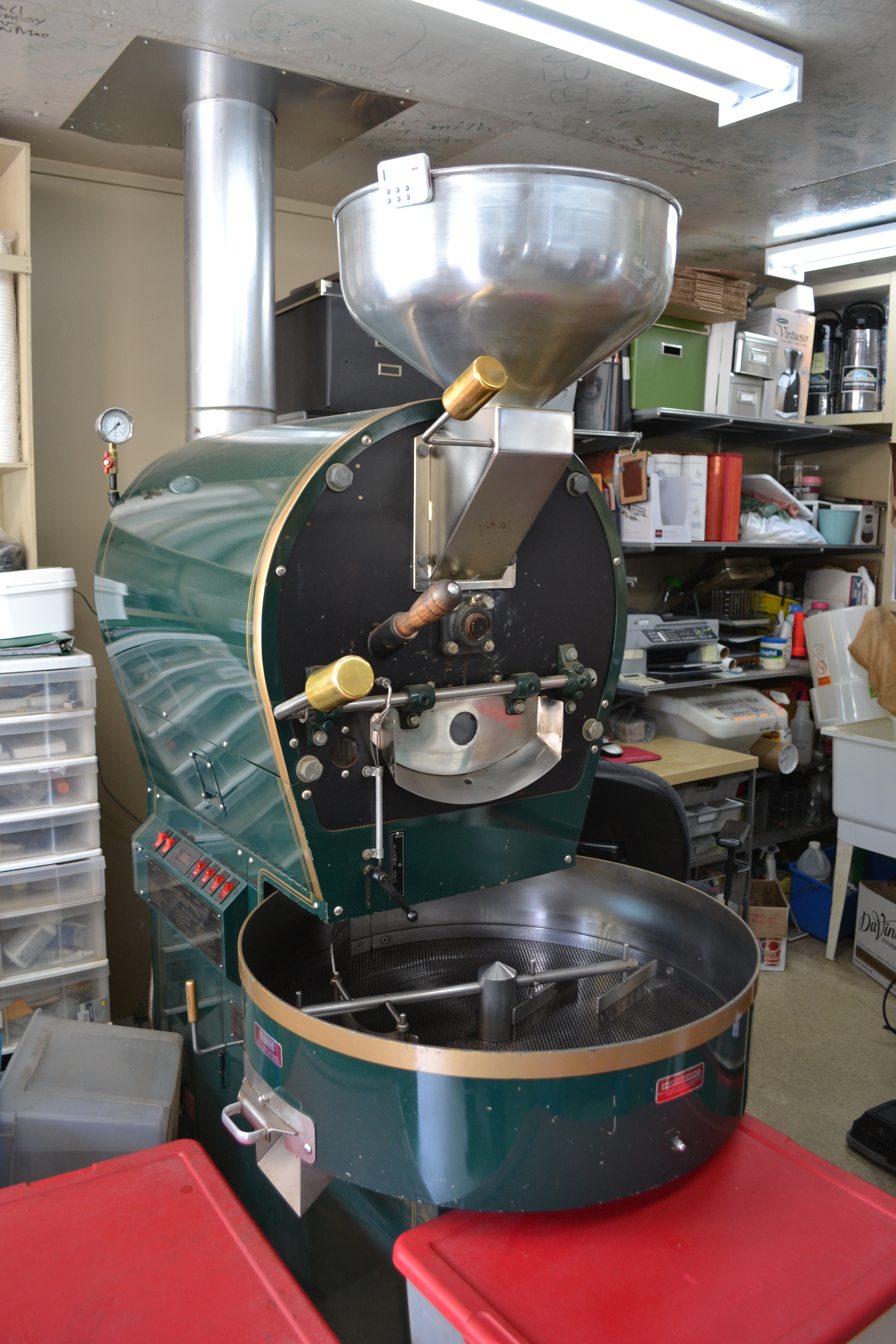
An electric coffee roaster

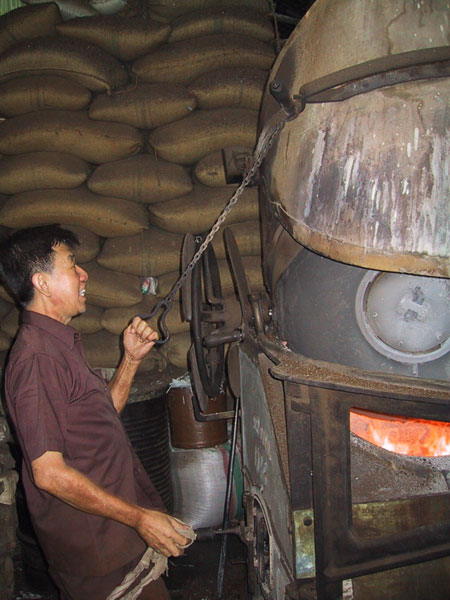
An old wood-fired coffee roaster

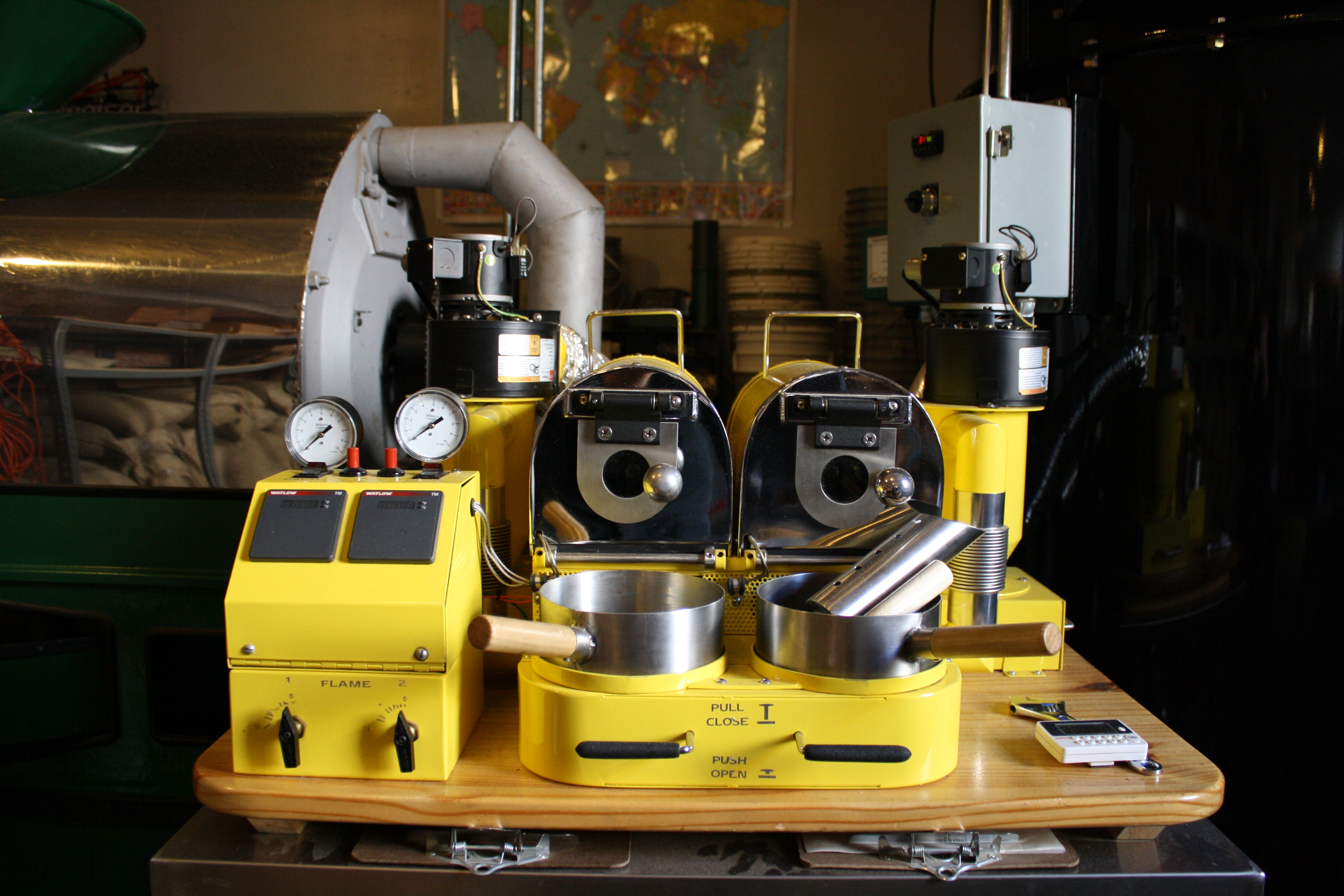
A two-barrel coffee roaster for roasting coffee samples prior to purchasing

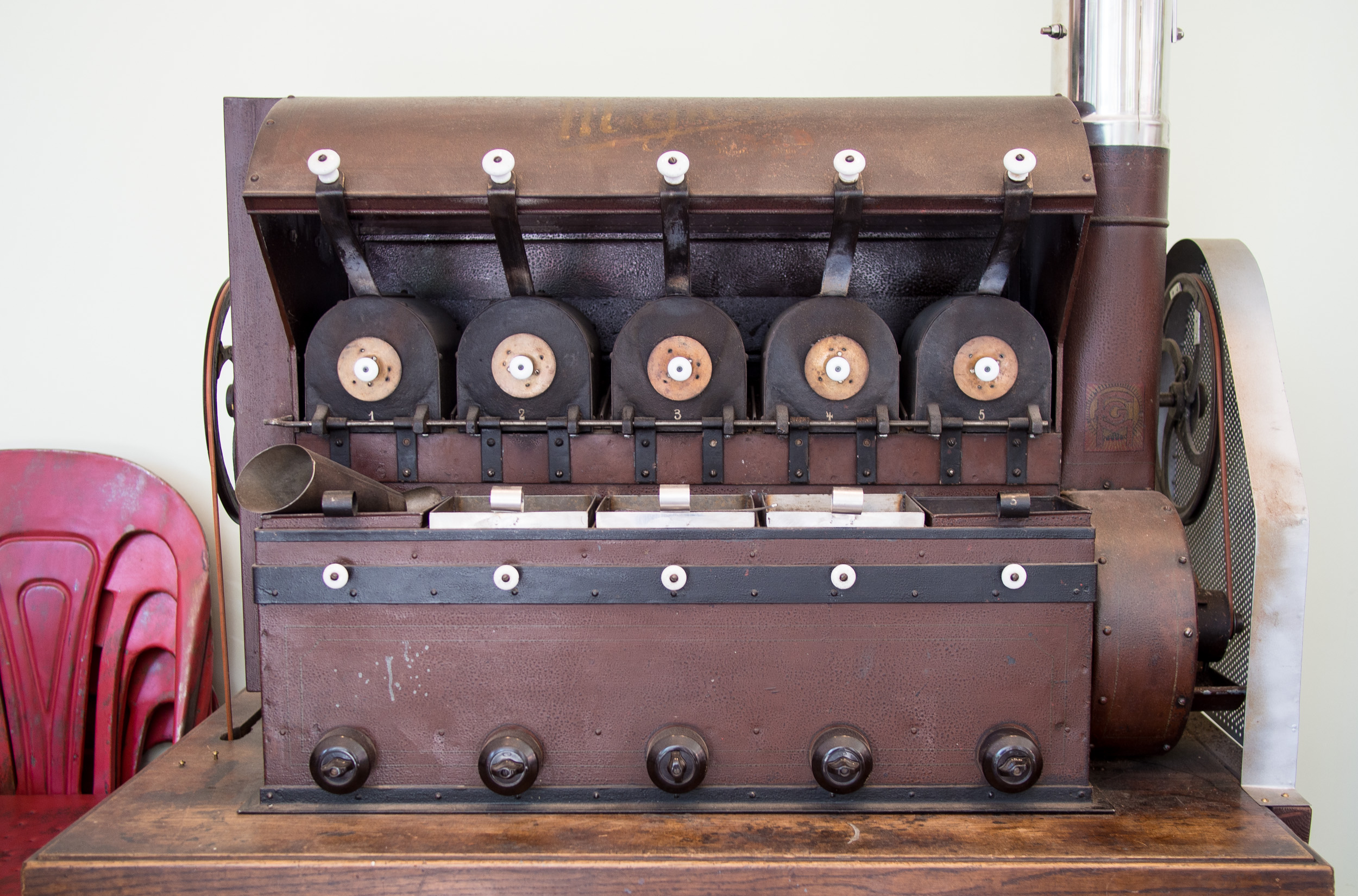
An antique "Mignon" five-barrel test roasting machine

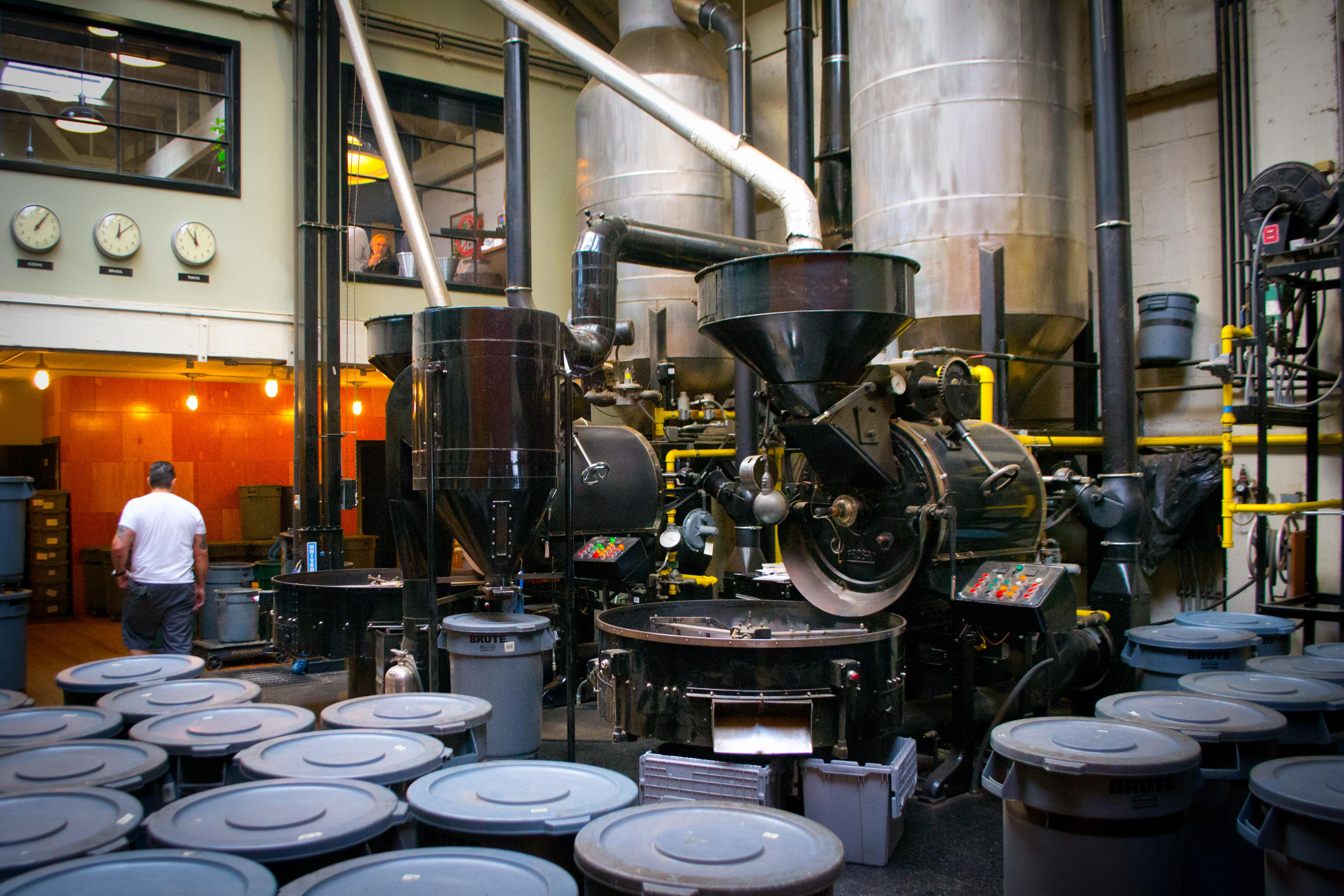
The roasting room at a midsize coffee company

== See also ==
- Dry roasting
- Food grading
- Torrefacto
