= Pulper =

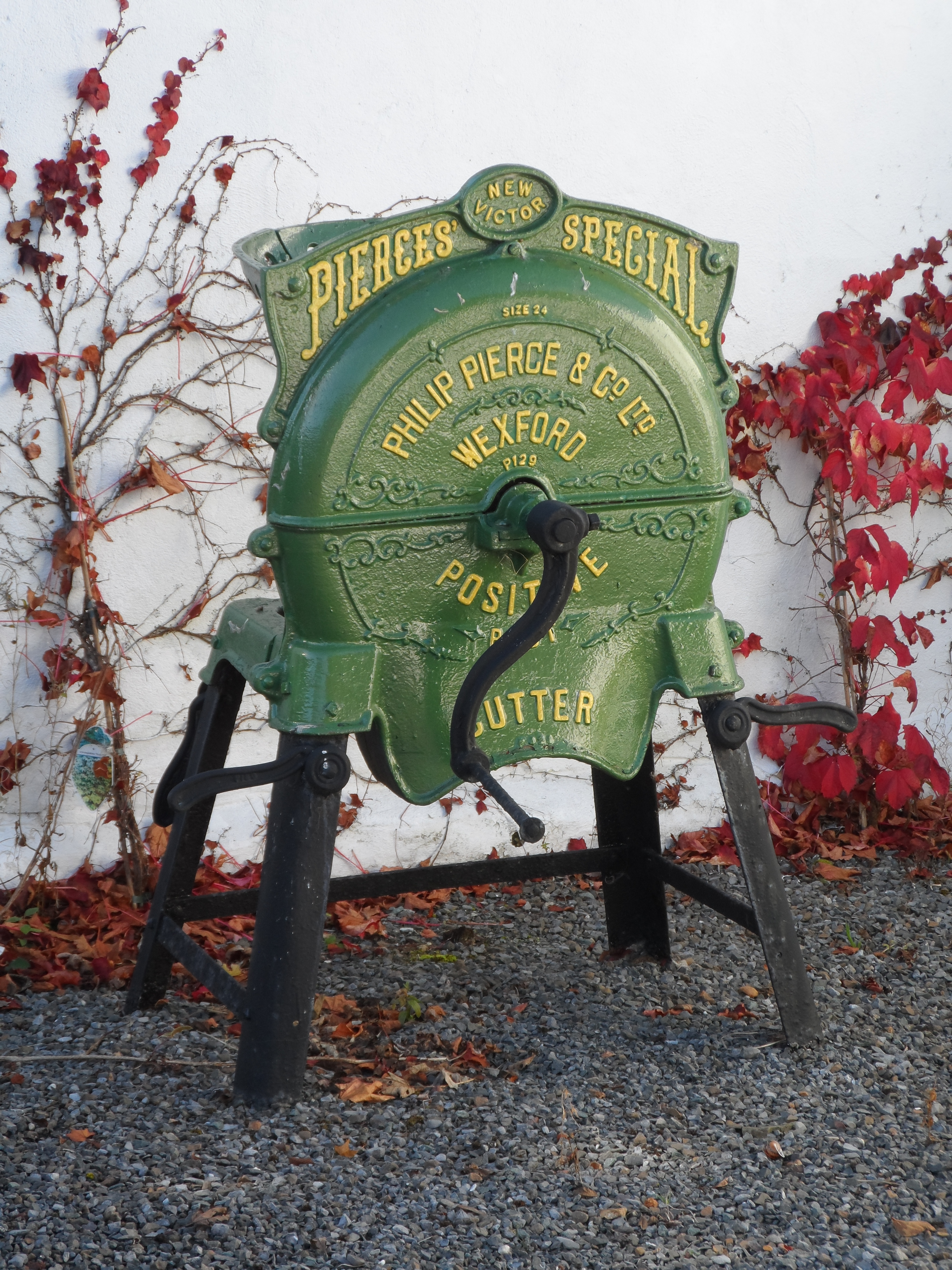
Turnip pulper (positive root cutter), made in Ireland.

In agriculture, a pulper is a machine designed to remove pulp (i.e. the soft flesh) from agricultural produce. For example, in coffee growing, the ripe red cherries are picked from the coffee bushes and, before fermentation and later drying, the soft pulp needs to be removed (otherwise a potentially uncontrollable fermentation/rot will occur). In the case of coffee, the pulping is normally done in a pulper that is either hand-cranked or engine-driven; the beans come into contact with a rotating spiked drum that removes the pulp or flesh. The sticky beans that result from this process then have to be washed, fermented, washed again and dried, before further processing (milling to remove the parchment) and then roasting.

In paper making, a pulper is a machine that produces pulp from cellulose fibres; this pulp can directly be used by a paper machine. In fufu powder making, a pulper is a machine that is used to pulp the fermented cassava to remove Fibre before sedimentation.

Post-consumer waste is re-pulped, in one of the processes involved in recycling it.
