= Springdale =

Springdale may refer to:

== Australia ==
- Springdale, New South Wales
- Springdale, Queensland, a locality in the Southern Downs Region

== Canada ==
- Springdale Caldera
- Springdale, Alberta
- Springdale, Brampton
- Springdale, Newfoundland and Labrador
  - Springdale Aerodrome

== New Zealand ==
- Springdale, New Zealand, a locality in the Waikato region

== United States ==
- Springdale, Arkansas
  - Springdale Municipal Airport
  - Springdale Public Schools
  - Springdale High School
- Springdale (Stamford), Connecticut
  - Springdale station
- Springdale, Idaho
- Springdale, Iowa
- Springdale, Kansas
- Springdale, Louisville, Kentucky
- Springdale, Maryland
- Springdale, Holyoke, Massachusetts
- Springdale station (Massachusetts), in Canton
- Springdale, Mississippi
- Springdale, Montana
- Springdale, New Jersey
- Springdale, Sussex County, New Jersey
- Springdale, North Carolina
- Springdale, Ohio
- Springdale, Oregon
- Springdale, Pennsylvania
- Springdale, Lancaster County, South Carolina
- Springdale, Lexington County, South Carolina
- Springdale, Utah
- Springdale, Washington
- Springdale, Wisconsin, a town
- Springdale, Buffalo County, Wisconsin, a ghost town
- Springdale Township, Michigan
- Springdale Township, Redwood County, Minnesota
- Springdale Township, Valley County, Nebraska
- Springdale Township, Pennsylvania
- Springdale Lake, a lake in Georgia
- Springdale Mall, in Mobile, Alabama
- Spring Dale, West Virginia

=== On the National Register of Historic Places ===
- Old Springdale High School, in Springdale, Arkansas
- Springdale (Princeton), New Jersey, official residence of the president of the Princeton Theological Seminary, in the Princeton Historic District
- Springdale (Tiffin, Ohio), listed on the National Register of Historic Places in Seneca County, Ohio
- Springdale (Crozier, Virginia), a home in Goochland County
- Spring Dale (Dublin, Virginia), also known as Springdale, a house
- Springdale (Frederick County, Virginia), a farm property
- Springdale (Lexington, Virginia), a house
- Springdale (Mathews, Virginia), a plantation house
- John Hite House, also known as Springdale, near Bartonsville, Frederick County, Virginia
- Springdale Cemetery, a cemetery in Peoria, Illinois
- Springdale Historic District (disambiguation), two NRHP-listed areas in Pennsylvania
- Springdale Mill Complex, near Bartonsville, Frederick County, Virginia
- Springdale Mills, a grist mill in Washington Township, Franklin County, Pennsylvania
- Springdale School, in Springdale, Oregon

== Other uses ==
- Springdale, code name of several Intel Pentium 4 chipsets

== See also ==
- Springdale Farm (disambiguation)
- Springdale Township (disambiguation)
