= Stamford station =

Stamford station could refer to:

- Stamford railway station in Lincolnshire, England.
- Stamford East railway station in Lincolnshire, England.
- Stamford Transportation Center in Stamford, Connecticut, USA.
- Stamford station (South Dakota) former station in South Dakota, USA.
- Stamford Railroad Station (New York) former station in New York, USA.
- Stamford railway station (Queensland) in Stamford, Queensland, Australia

The following stations also have Stamford in their names:

- Stamford Brook tube station in London, England
- Stamford Hill railway station in London, England

== See also ==
- Glenbrook station (Metro-North) in a neighborhood of Stamford, Connecticut
- Springdale station in a neighborhood of Stamford, Connecticut
- Stanford station, a Caltrain station in Palo Alto, California
- Stanford-le-Hope railway station in Essex, England
