= Springdale Township =

Springdale Township may refer to:

- Springdale Township, Washington County, Arkansas, in Washington County, Arkansas
- Springdale Township, Cedar County, Iowa
- Springdale Township, Sumner County, Kansas
- Springdale Township, Manistee County, Michigan
- Springdale Township, Redwood County, Minnesota
- Springdale Township, Valley County, Nebraska
- Springdale Township, Pennsylvania
- Springdale Township, Lincoln County, South Dakota, in Lincoln County, South Dakota
- Springdale Township, Roberts County, South Dakota, in Roberts County, South Dakota

== See also ==
- Springdale (disambiguation)
