= Springdale Cemetery station =

Former passenger rail station in Darien, Connecticut

Springdale Cemetery
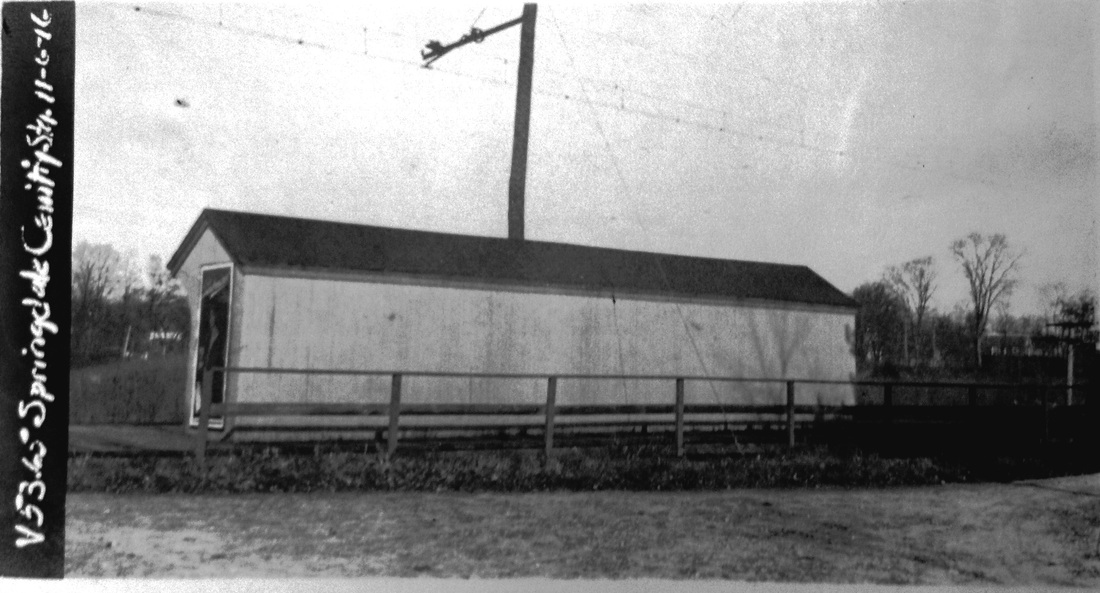
- The original station structure, 1916

General information
- Coordinates: 41.0941°N 73.5128°W
- Platforms: 1 low–level side platform
- Tracks: 1

History
- Opened: 1898
- Closed: 1972
Location

Springdale Cemetery was a passenger rail station on the New Canaan Branch of the New York, New Haven, and Hartford Railroad and later the Penn Central. Located in Darien, Connecticut, near the border with Stamford, the station opened in 1898 to service the St. Johns Cemetery in the Springdale neighborhood. A decline in station ridership that had begun in the early 1900s culminated in the station being closed and merged with the nearby Springdale stop in 1972.

== History ==
Springdale Cemetery station first opened in 1898. It served St. Johns Cemetery, of St. Johns Catholic Church in Stamford, and was primarily used by funeral attendees. In some cases, the bodies of the deceased passed through the station as well. Traffic to the station began to decline after the Stamford Street Railroad was extended to Camp Avenue. By the 1960s, all station structures were removed, and service took place at a small patch of ballast at the Camp Avenue grade crossing. On August 20, 1969, two trains collided at the Hoyt Street crossing just north of the station. Four people were killed and forty more were injured. On July 17, 1972, the station was closed and merged with the Springdale station located 0.5 miles (800 meters) to the south.

== Station layout ==
The station, which was unique for being the only station in Connecticut located inside of a cemetery, originally consisted of one low-level side platform and a large shed-like depot that was later reduced. In the station's later days, it consisted of only a flag stop signal located at the ballast patch on Camp Avenue. The New Canaan Branch had one track at this location.
