= Woodway station =

Railroad station in Darien, Connecticut, U.S.

Woodway

General information
- Location: Near 405 Hoyt Street, Darien, Connecticut
- Coordinates: 41.102932°N 73.505876°W
- Platforms: 1 low level side platform
- Tracks: 1

History
- Opened: 1918
- Closed: 1972
Location

Woodway station was a station on the New Canaan Branch of the former New York, New Haven, and Hartford Railroad and later the Penn Central. The station was located off of Hoyt Street in Darien, Connecticut. Woodway station closed on July 17, 1972.

== History ==
The station appears on station lists as early as 1919. The station was likely named and established for the nearby Woodway Country Club in Darien, which opened in 1916. On August 20, 1969, about .8 miles (1.3 km) south of Woodway, at the Hoyt Street crossing, two trains collided, killing four and injuring forty people. The station was closed and consolidated with the Talmadge Hill station on July 17, 1972. All station structures were removed afterwards.

== Station layout ==
The station had a three-sided lean-to style wooden shelter with a low level side platform with a wooden fence that surrounded two sides of the platform. None of the station structures are extant. The station was served by one track from the New Canaan Branch. The station had access from a dirt trail that led from Hoyt Street. The station also had an unpaved parking lot on the east side of the tracks, which was accessible via an unpaved road.
