= Talmadge Hill station =

Metro-North Railroad station in Connecticut

Talmadge Hill
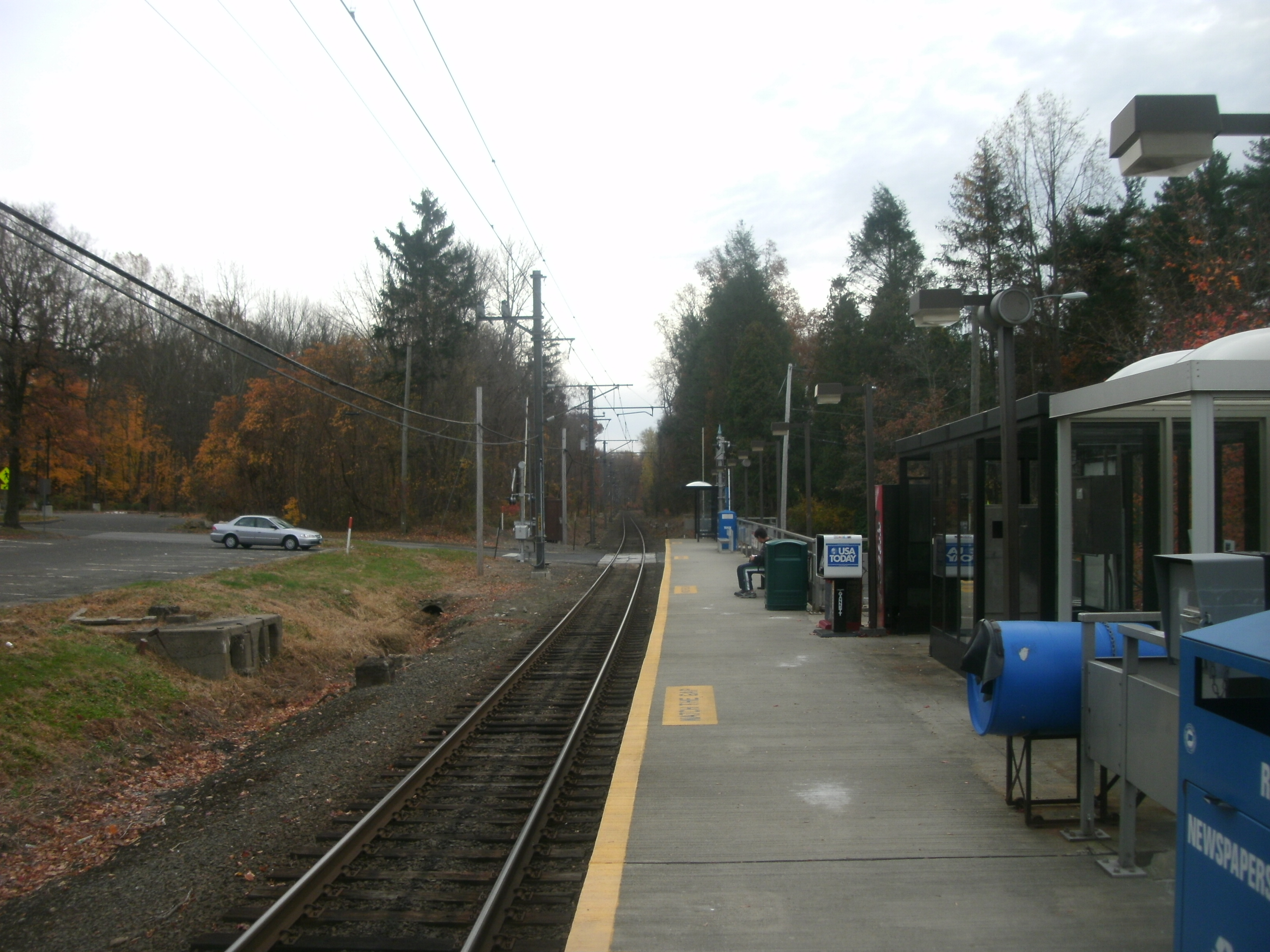
- Talmadge Hill station in November 2011

General information
- Location: 1 Talmadge Hill Road; New Canaan, Connecticut
- Coordinates: 41.116°N 73.4981°W
- Owner: Connecticut Department of Transportation
- Operator: Town of New Canaan and Metro-North Railroad
- Platforms: 1 side platform
- Tracks: 1

Construction
- Parking: 311 spaces
- Accessible: yes

Other information
- Fare zone: 31

History
- Opened: 1868
- Rebuilt: 1972

Passengers
- 2018: 432 daily boardings

Services
Preceding station	Metro-North Railroad	Following station
Springdale toward Stamford or Grand Central	New Canaan Branch	New Canaan Terminus
Location

Talmadge Hill station is a commuter rail station on the New Canaan Branch of the Metro-North Railroad New Haven Line, located just south of the Merritt Parkway in New Canaan, Connecticut.

== Station layout ==
The station has one four-car-long high-level side platform to the west of the single track.

The Talmadge Hill station also has a central shelter typical of other small stations on the New Haven Line, as well as a pair of smaller shelters on either end of the platform. There are two parking lots to the west of the station and to the east there are six lots. The two lots furthest to the east are for daily parking, while the remaining are for monthly commuters with New Canaan resident permits. The station is owned by the Connecticut Department of Transportation (ConnDOT) and operated by the Town of New Canaan. The 366-space parking lot, except for 18 spaces on the east side of the tracks, is operated by the town as well. Metro-North is responsible for trash cleanup and platform lighting.
