= Glenbrook station (Metro-North) =

Metro-North Railroad station in Connecticut

Glenbrook
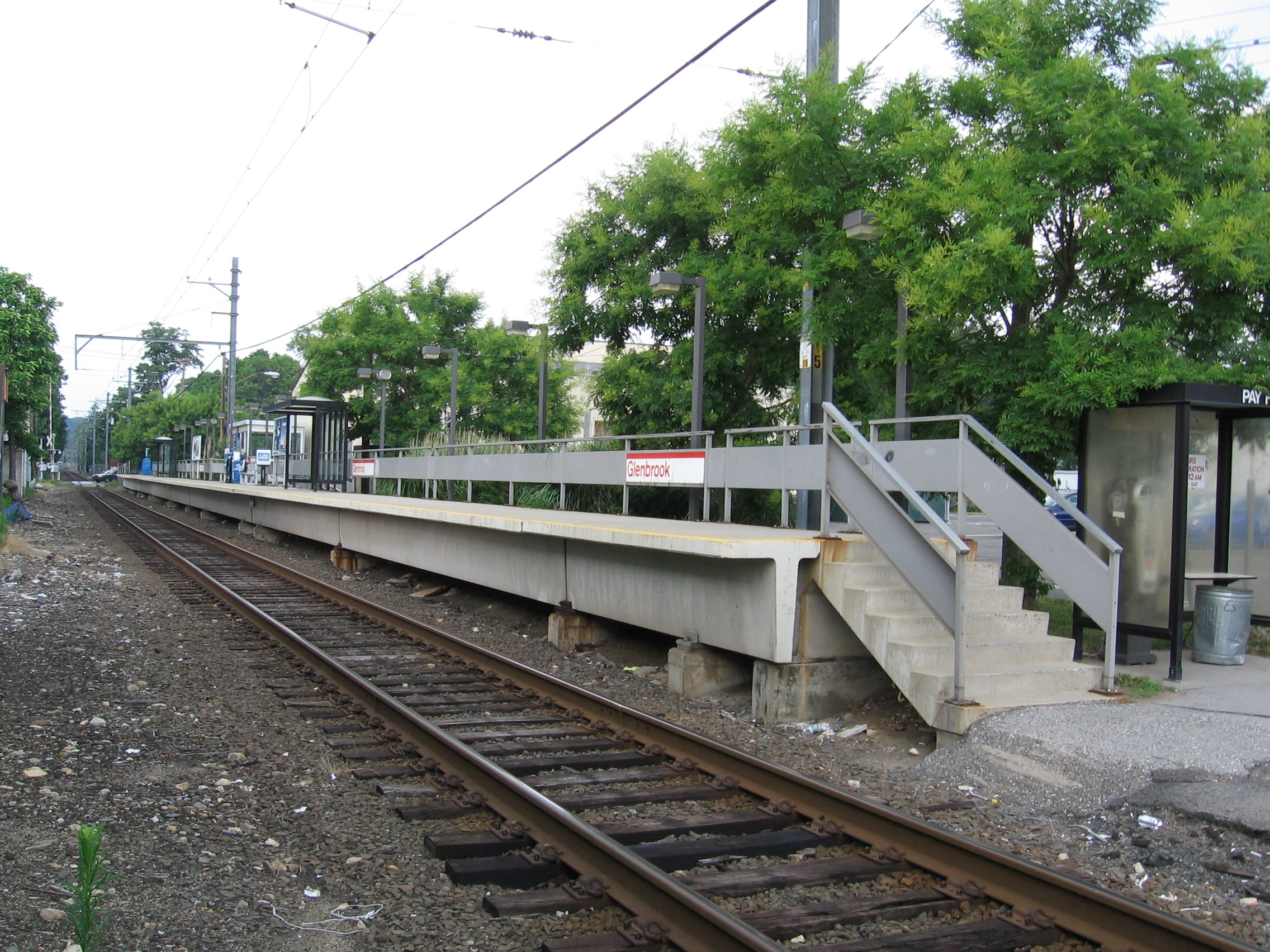
- Glenbrook station in July 2007

General information
- Location: 2 Crescent Street; Stamford, Connecticut
- Coordinates: 41.0705°N 73.5199°W
- Owner: ConnDOT
- Operator: ConnDOT and Metro-North Railroad
- Platforms: 1 side platform
- Tracks: 1
- Connections: CT Transit Stamford: 344, 349

Construction
- Cycle facilities: Yes
- Accessible: yes

Other information
- Fare zone: 31

History
- Opened: 1868
- Rebuilt: 1950s, 1972

Passengers
- 2018: 415 daily boardings

Services
Preceding station	Metro-North Railroad	Following station
Stamford toward Stamford or Grand Central	New Canaan Branch	Springdale toward New Canaan
Former services
Preceding station	New York, New Haven and Hartford Railroad	Following station
Stamford toward New York	Main Line	Noroton toward New Haven
Location

Glenbrook station is a commuter rail stop on the New Canaan Branch of the Metro-North Railroad's New Haven Line, located in the Glenbrook section of Stamford, Connecticut.

== Station layout ==
The station has one four-car-long high-level side platform with two waiting shelters to the east of the track. The platform is situated between the grade crossings of Glenbrook Road to the south and Crescent Street to the north. There are no ticket machines.

The station is owned and operated by the Connecticut Department of Transportation (ConnDOT), with some responsibilities delegated to Metro-North. Parking is managed by the city of Stamford. CT Transit Stamford provides bus service from the station.

== History ==
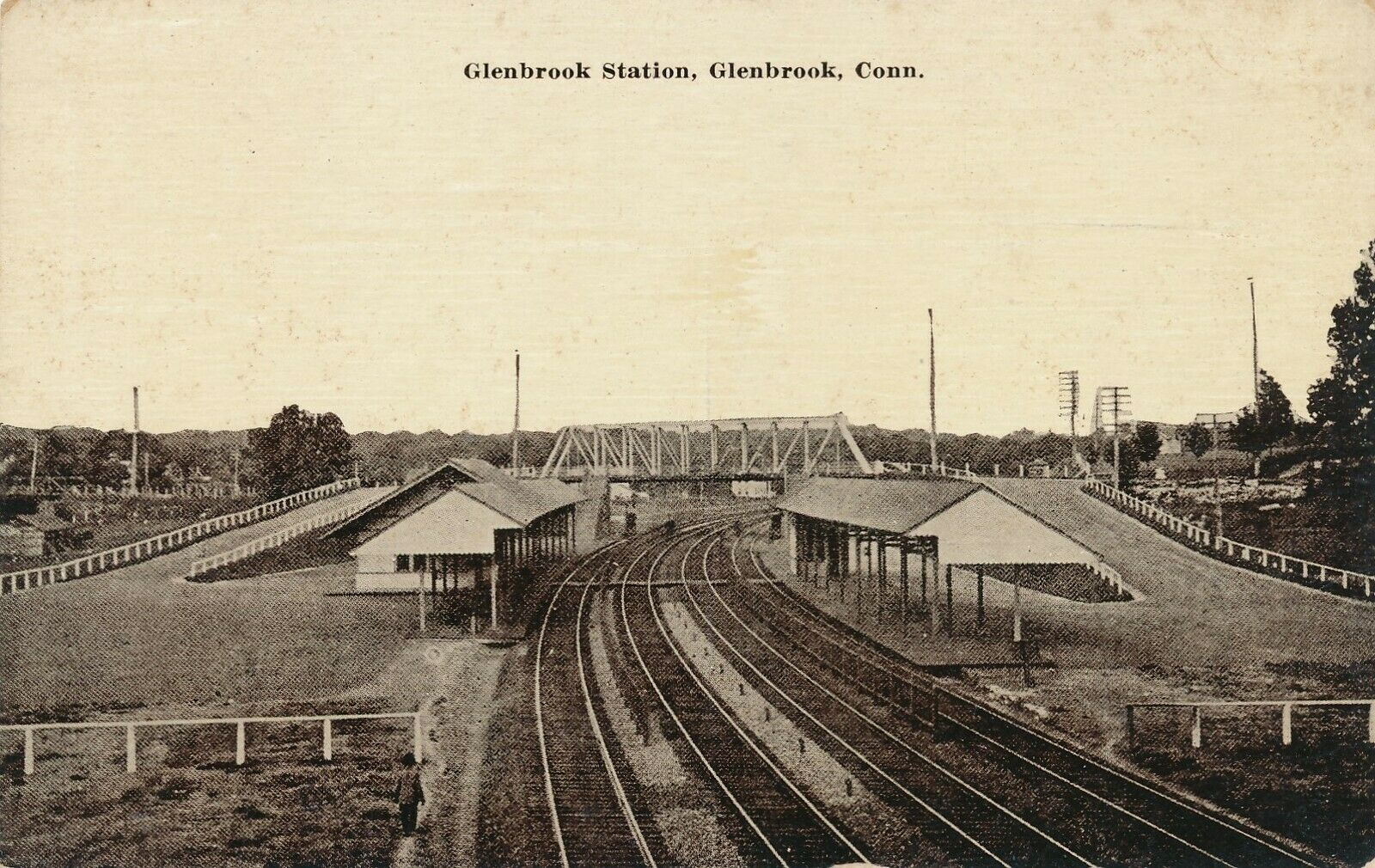
The mainline station on an early postcard

Glenbrook was formerly served by two stations – one on the New York–New Haven mainline, and one on the New Canaan Branch. The mainline station, located at Courtland Avenue, was closed in the early 1970s. The station has been unstaffed since January 15, 1972.

In 2007, city officials were considering the idea of building a second train station in the area, possibly at the original mainline station site. In December 2010, Connecticut Governor M. Jodi Rell announced that the state Bonding Commission was expected to approve $950,000 in financing for a canopy.
