= Bartonsville, Virginia =

Unincorporated community in Virginia, United States

- Unincorporated community
- Location within Virginia Location within the United States
- Coordinates: 39°6′41″N 78°12′43″W
- Country: United States
- State: Virginia
- County: Frederick
- Time zone: UTC−5 (Eastern (EST))
  - Summer (DST): UTC−4 (EDT)
- GNIS feature ID: 1499094

Bartonsville is an unincorporated community located along Opequon Creek in Frederick County, Virginia, United States, between Winchester and Stephens City. Bartonsville is on Springdale Road (SR 649) to the west of Valley Pike (US 11). Historically, it has been referred to as Barton's Mill and Bartonville. The area of Bartonsville was first settled by the Hite Family in 1733. It acquired its name from the Barton family, who owned various properties from c. 1801 to 1873.

== Historic sites ==
- Springdale (John Hite House) (1753)
- Springdale Mill Complex (1788)
