= Springdale Farm =

Springdale Farm(s) may refer to:

- Springdale Farm (Burnham, Maine), listed on the National Register of Historic Places in Waldo County, Maine
- Springdale Farm (Mendenhall, Pennsylvania), listed on the National Register of Historic Places in Southern Chester County, Pennsylvania
- Springdale Farms, a historic farmers market in Cherry Hill, New Jersey
