= New Canaan Branch =

Metro-North Railroad branch in Connecticut

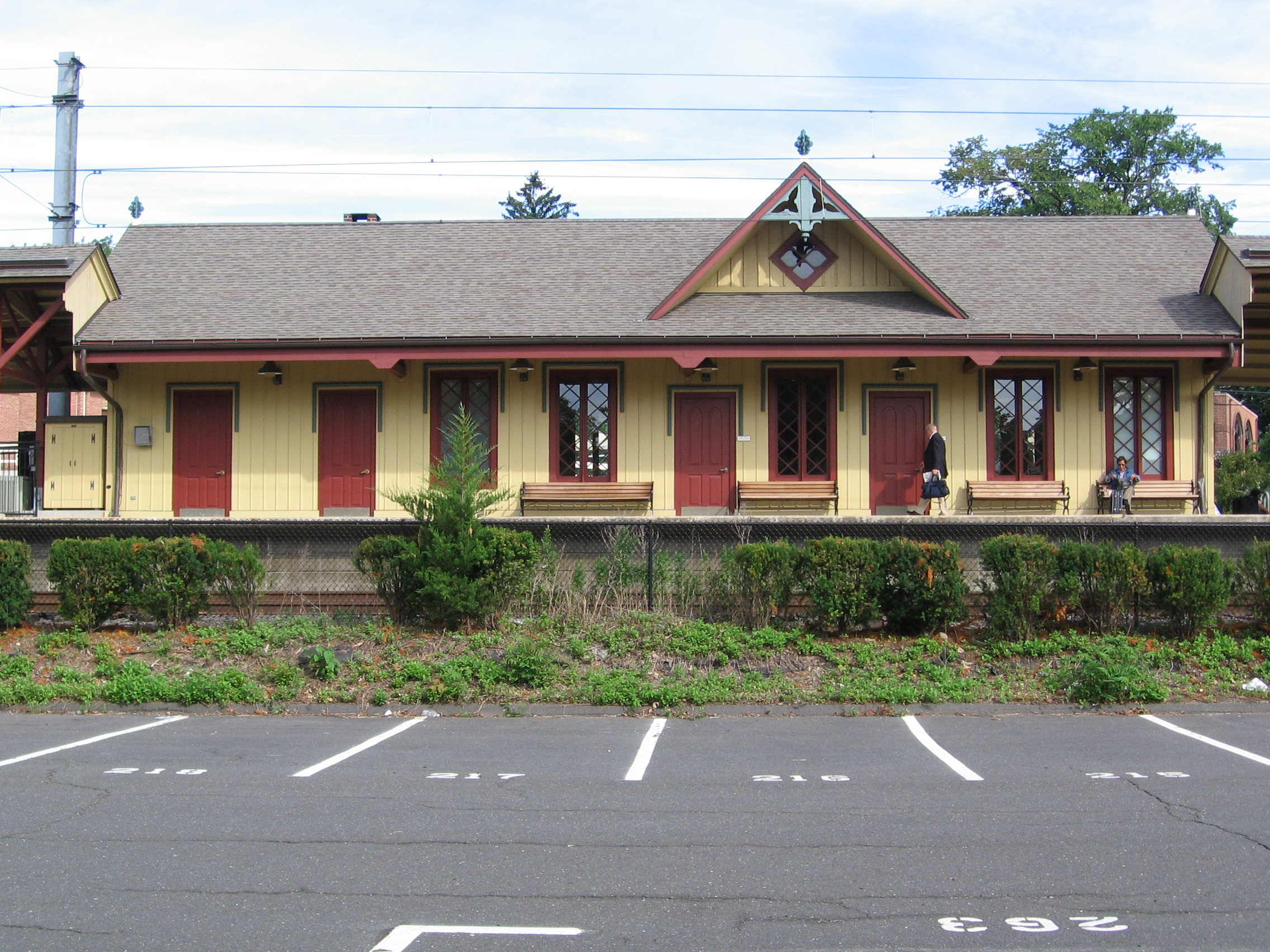
- New Canaan station

Overview
- Status: Operating
- Owner: Connecticut DOT
- Locale: Stamford, Connecticut, to New Canaan, Connecticut
- Termini: Grand Central (weekday service) Stamford; New Canaan
- Stations: 5

Service
- Type: Commuter rail
- System: Metro-North Railroad
- Operator(s): New Canaan Railroad (1868–1879); Stamford & New Canaan Railroad (1883–1884); NY,NH&H (1884–1969); Penn Central (1969–1971); ConnDOT (lessor 1971–1976, owner 1976–present); Metro-North (operator 1983–present)
- Rolling stock: Kawasaki M8

Technical
- Line length: 8.2 miles (13.2 km)
- Number of tracks: 1
- Character: Commuter rail
- Track gauge: 4 ft 8 1/2 in (1,435 mm) standard gauge
- Electrification: Overhead line, 12.5 kV 60 Hz AC
- Operating speed: 40 mph (64 km/h)
Route map
New Canaan Branch highlighted in red (full weekday route)

The New Canaan Branch is an 8.2-mile (13 km) long branch line of the Metro-North Railroad New Haven Line that begins from a junction east of downtown Stamford, Connecticut, north to New Canaan. On weekdays, many branch line trains run directly to and from New York City, eliminating the need to transfer at Stamford. It opened in 1868 as the New Canaan Railroad.

== History ==
The New Canaan Railroad was chartered in May 1866 as a short branch of the New York & New Haven Railroad. It opened July 4, 1868 when a train ran from Stamford to New Canaan. Within a year of the opening of operations a branch from the NY&NH main line south in Stamford to the pier at the Pine Island Steamboat Landing was opened to allow passengers and freight to switch to steamboats running on Long Island Sound. Despite such attempts to increase revenue on January 1, 1879, the company went bankrupt, and it was taken over in foreclosure in 1883 by the Stamford and New Canaan Railroad, which incorporated in 1882. The New York, New Haven & Hartford Railroad leased the line on October 1, 1884, and on October 1, 1890, it was merged into the NYNH&H.

On August 7, 1898, the line was electrified using 500V DC overhead catenary. On November 1, 1907, the use of 500-volt DC overhead catenary was discontinued, and in 1908, it was replaced with 11,000 volt AC operation. Costs were reduced by supplying the line from the Cos Cob station instead of by independent power.

The NYNH&H was merged into Penn Central in 1969. On January 1, 1971, the State of Connecticut leased operation of passenger service along the New Canaan Branch to Penn Central for $100,000 per year. On July 17, 1972, the stations at Woodway and Springdale Cemetery were both closed. On April 10, 1972, Penn Central briefly suspended off-peak service on the branch to install high-level platforms at stations. In 1983, the Metro-North Commuter Railroad took over the operation of trains on the branch.

== Current operation ==
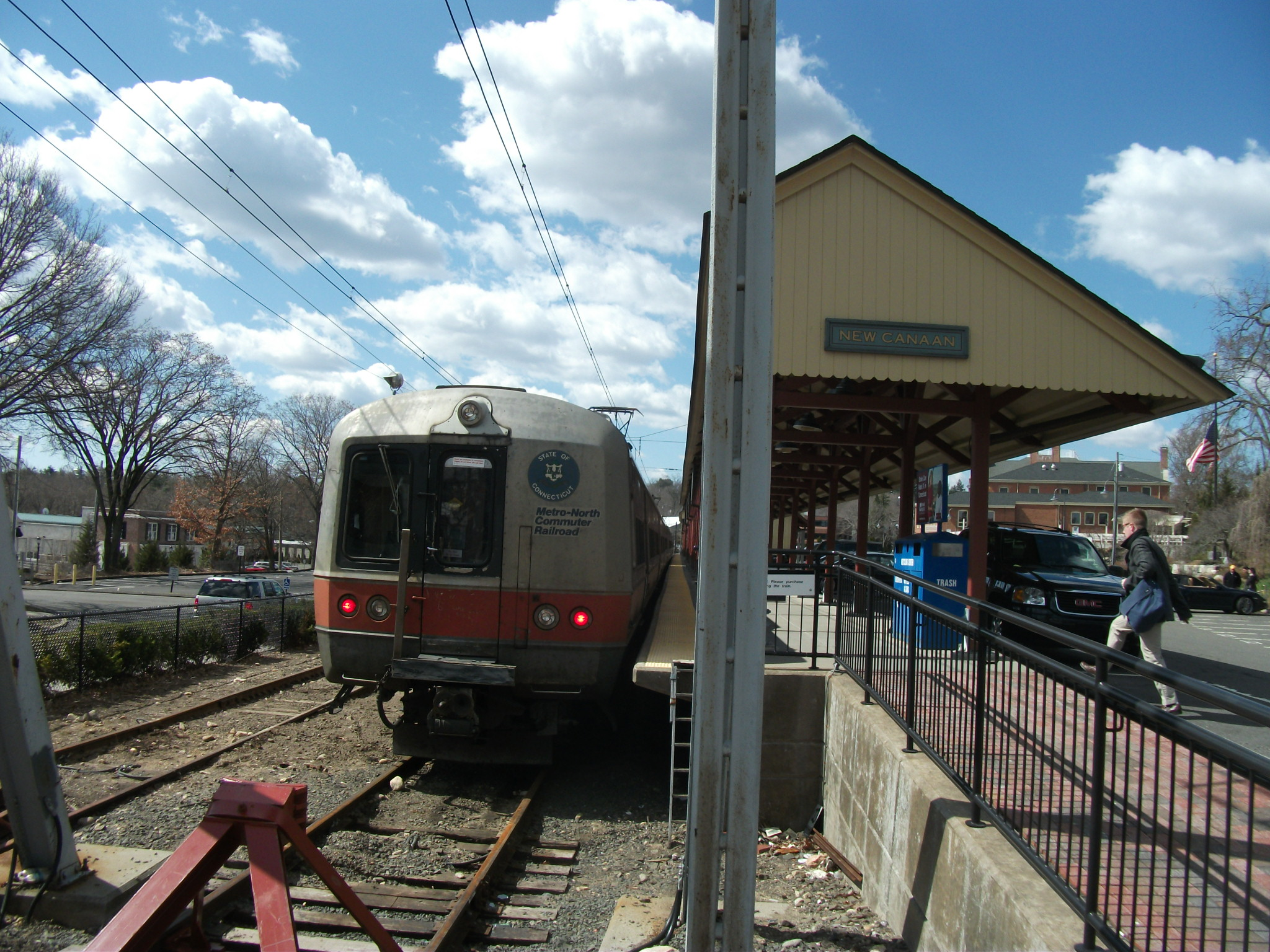
A train at New Canaan station in 2010.

Like the New Haven mainline from Mt. Vernon, New York, to New Haven, Connecticut, the entire branch is electrified with overhead catenary, although it is currently the only entirely electrified branch of the New Haven Line. Beginning in March 2011, the newly delivered Kawasaki M8 railcars started running in revenue service along the branch, and eventually took over operation from the older Budd M2 railcars. In contrast with the main New Haven Line, the branch is entirely single-tracked except for the storage tracks at New Canaan, and there are frequent grade crossings along the branch.

=== Improvements ===
As of July 2007, a Stamford East Side station is under consideration for the line or just past it on the New Haven Line.

In 2011, the three tracks at the terminus – the 10-car main track, a middle track, and what was a short 4-car "Bulk" track – were improved. The "Bulk" track was extended, absorbing a row of parking to meet the length of the middle and main track, allowing for 3 full trains to 'stack' at the end of the line during the morning and evening rush hours. Electronic switching was added in the years following this improvement. This was recommended in the 2010 Branch Study.

PTC (Positive Train Control) was installed on the branch in 2019.

In 2019, the Stamford Atlantic Bridge replacement project incorporated a new "Track 7" for the New Canaan Branch operation. A new platform, canopy, and catenary lines were installed to support this new capacity at Stamford. The platform construction was halted during 2022 and remains unfinished as of 2023.

Improvements are planned on the line to allow for more frequent service. A siding and second platform will be built at Springdale. Construction was expected to cost $15 million and begin in 2020.

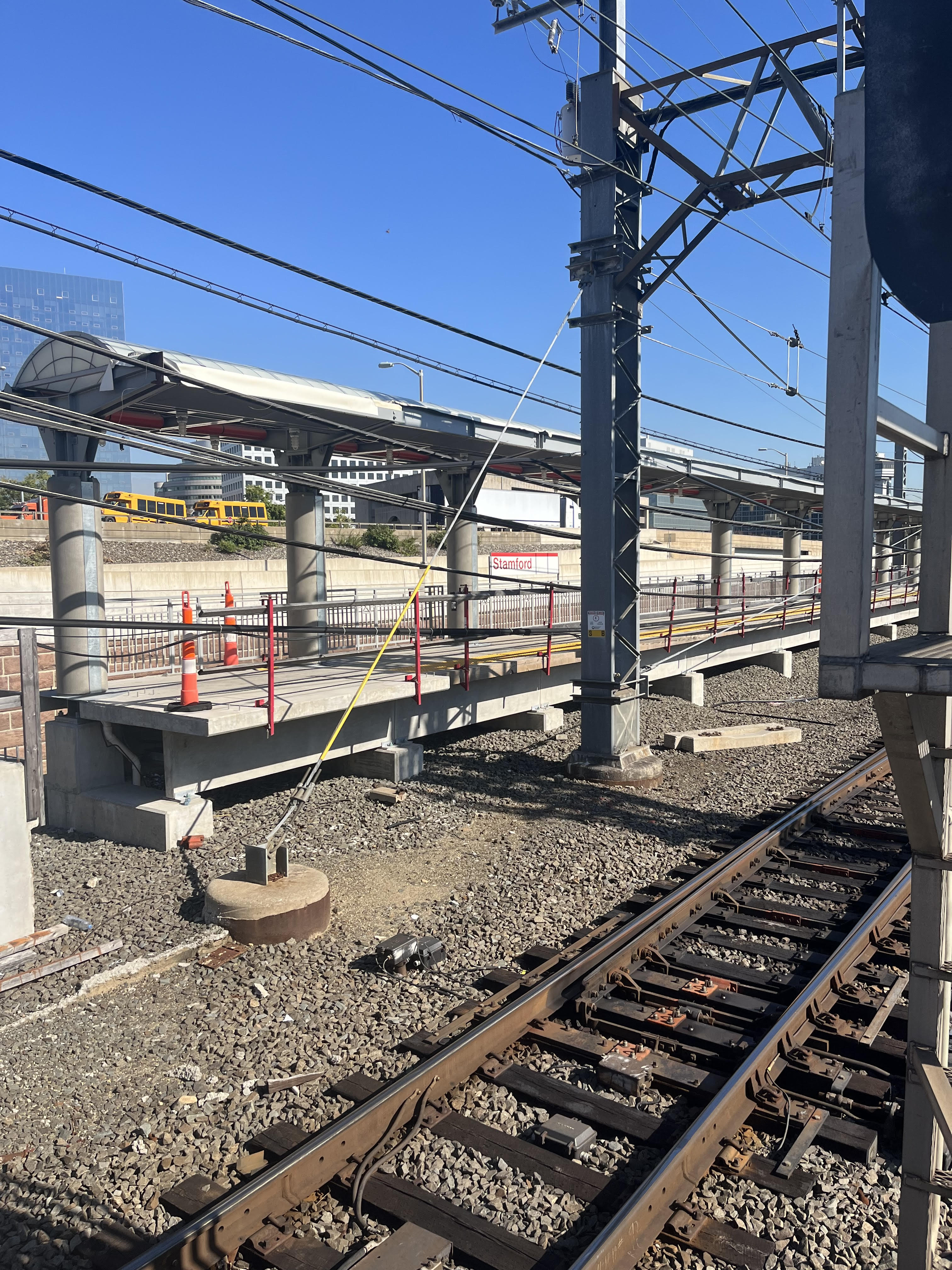
Platform 7 at Stamford under construction October 2023

On May 30, 2023, and continuing through August 2023, the New Canaan Branch was shut down for track rehabilitation work, with all service being replaced by shuttle buses. The work entails replacing 8,000 rail ties, 1,600 feet (490 m) of rails, and insulating rail joints. Repairs will also be made to mud spots, drainage and rail anchors, along with replacing bridge timbers on the Noroton River Bridge and resurfacing the entire line. Upon completion, a stretch of the branch within the Stamford region will have its speed limit increased, from 30 miles per hour (48 km/h) to 50 miles per hour (80 km/h).

== Incidents ==
On August 20, 1969 at about 8:20 p.m., a northbound commuter train with a 3-man crew and about 60 to 80 passengers hit an empty southbound train carrying only 5 employees, killing 4 and injuring 40 just north of the Hoyt Street crossing in Darien. The lead cars of each train were almost completely destroyed. The National Transportation Safety Board report concluded that the cause was the northbound train's failure to stop at a meeting point as stated on train orders.

On July 13, 1976, two trains collided, killing two and injuring 29. In October 1976, the CDOT released their report which only blamed the engineer of the northbound train (Number 1994) for excessive speed. The engineer's union contended that there was a problem with the train brakes, that there was an automatic track lubricator which had been putting down excessive oil for two weeks before the incident and an insufficient signal system. The National Transportation Safety Board released their final report on the incident on May 19, 1977 as Report Number RAR-77-04. That report concluded that the cause was "the failure of the engineer of train No. 1994 to perceive the train ahead and to apply the brakes at the earliest possible time". It also cited problems with the design of the signal system, design of the M2's exit doors and interior design of the trains.

The New Canaan Branch was severely impacted by Hurricane Sandy on October 29–30, 2012. The line was blocked by fallen trees in 37 different locations; many of these trees also brought down the overhead catenary wires. Shuttle buses replaced all trains. The railroad announced that regular service resumed on November 13. This resumption was marred by slippery rails caused by rain and fallen leaves, to the extent that service had to be shut down again that afternoon to deploy Metro-North's rail-washing train. Train service resumed in time for the evening commute.

On February 14, 2023 at approximately 7:30 a.m., an out of service train being moved to enter passenger service overran the New Canaan station, running through the bumper block and crashing through the station fencing before coming to a stop. The engineer and conductor onboard were injured, but not seriously. While this incident caused a suspension of service on the branch throughout the morning rush and midday hours; following repairs, service was restored with the 4:39 p.m. train from Stamford.

== Stations ==
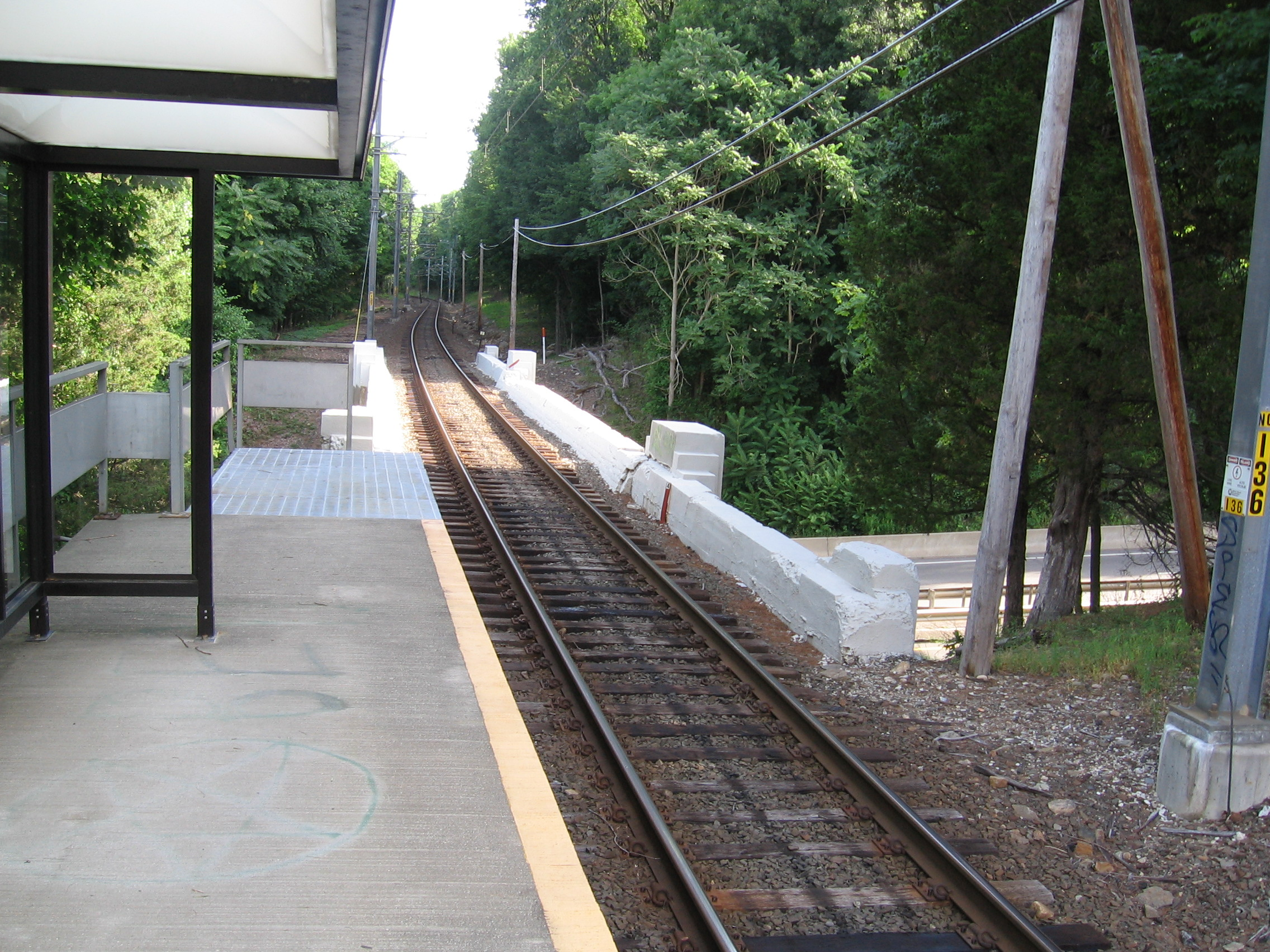
Talmadge Hill station over Merritt Parkway

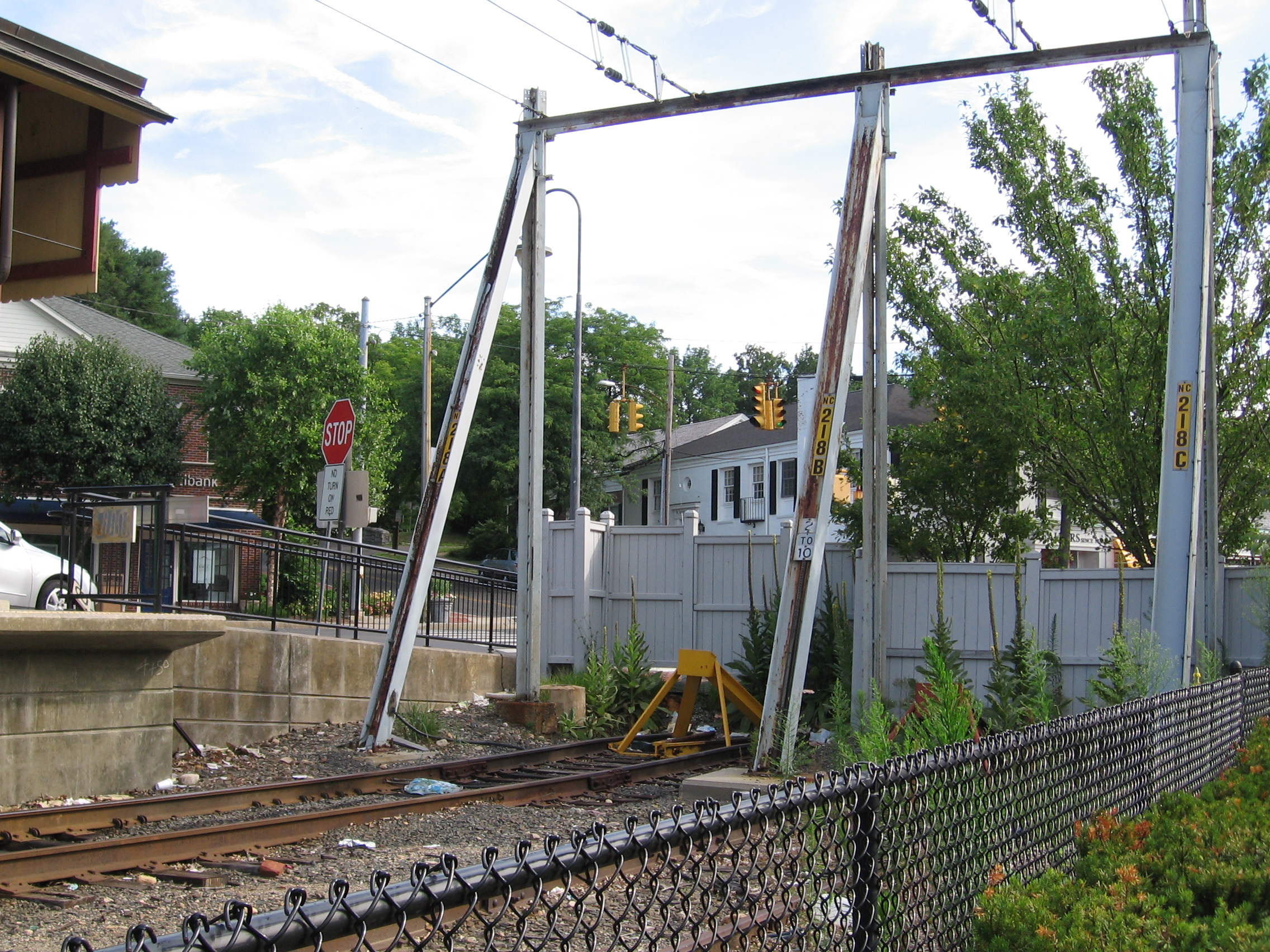
The end of the line in New Canaan

The following connecting services are available to Amtrak, Metro-North Railroad, and CT Transit.

Weekday service only
Closed stations

State	Zone	Location	Station	Miles (km) from GCT	Date opened	Date closed	Connections / notes
NY	1	Manhattan	Grand Central Terminal	0.0 (0)	October 6, 1871		Metro-North Railroad: ■ Harlem Line, ■ Hudson Line; Long Island Rail Road (at Grand Central Madison); NYC Subway: (at Grand Central–42nd Street); NYCT Bus, MTA Bus
NY	1	Manhattan	Harlem–125th Street	4.2 (6.8)	October 25, 1897		Metro-North Railroad: ■ Harlem Line, ■ Hudson Line; NYC Subway: (at 125th Street); NYCT Bus
CT	15	Greenwich	Greenwich	28.1 (45.2)	December 25, 1848		CTtransit Samford, Norwalk Transit District
CT	16	Stamford	Stamford	33.0 (53.1)	1849		Amtrak: Acela, Northeast Regional, Vermonter; Metro-North Railroad: ■ New Haven Line; CTtransit Stamford, UConn Stamford Shuttle; Intercity bus: Greyhound, Peter Pan; Limited service station
CT	31	Stamford	Glenbrook	35.2 (56.6)	July 4, 1868		CTtransit Stamford
CT	31	Stamford	Springdale	36.9 (59.4)	July 4, 1868		CTtransit Stamford
CT	31	Stamford	Springdale Cemetery			July 17, 1972	Consolidated into Springdale.
CT	31	Darien	Woodway			July 17, 1972	Consolidated into Talmadge Hill.
CT	31	New Canaan	Talmadge Hill	39.0 (62.8)	July 4, 1868		
CT	31	New Canaan	New Canaan	41.2 (66.3)	July 4, 1868		

== See also ==
- List of New York, New Haven and Hartford Railroad precursors
