= Springdale (Stamford) =

Coordinates: 41°05′16″N 73°31′27″W

- Neighborhood
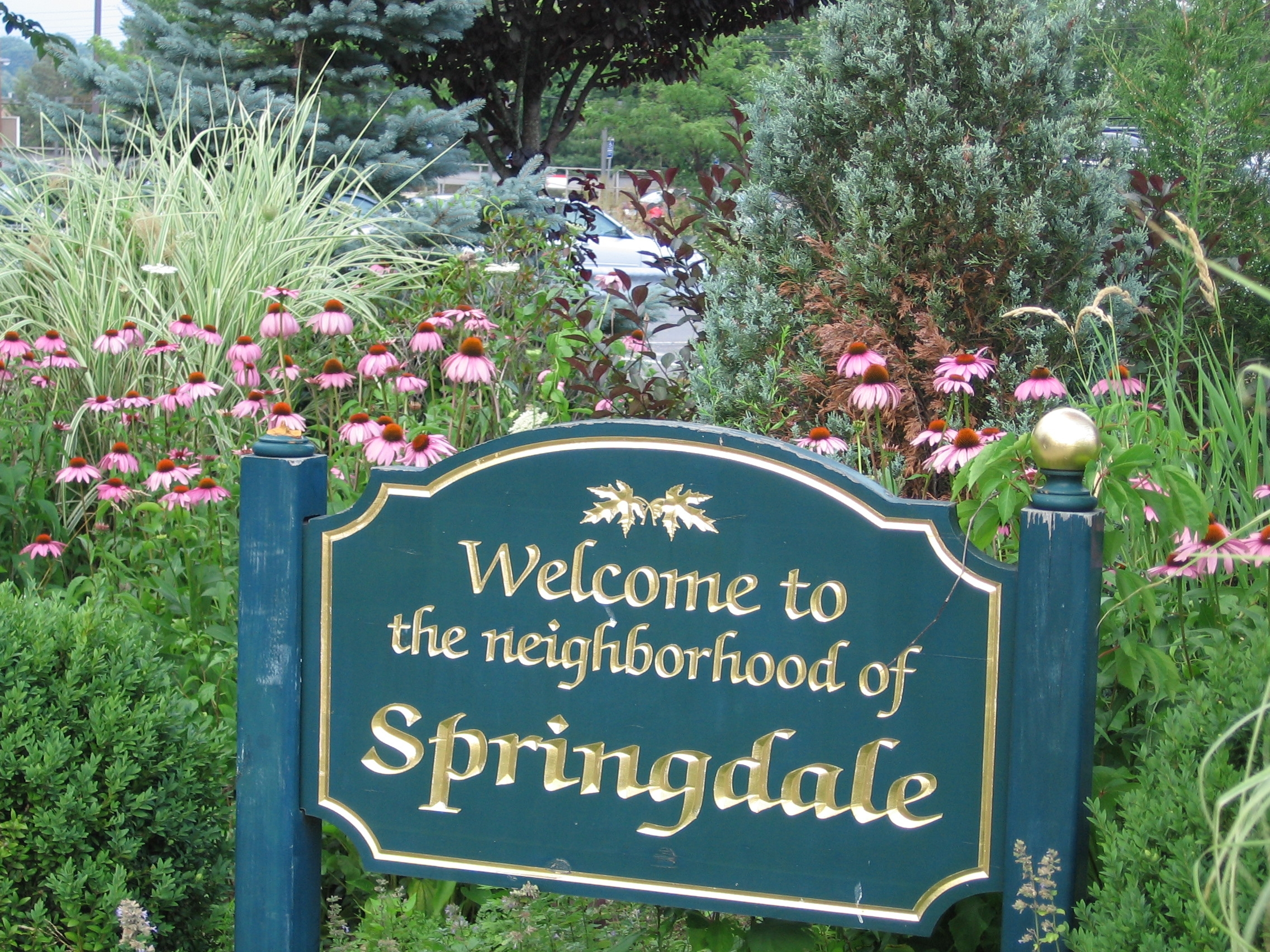
- Welcome sign at entrance to railroad station, Hope Street
- Interactive map of Springdale
- Country: United States
- State: Connecticut
- County: Fairfield
- City: Stamford
- Time zone: UTC-5:00 (Eastern)
  - Summer (DST): UTC-4:00 (Eastern)
- Area code: 203

Springdale is a neighborhood in Stamford, Connecticut. Located in the eastern portion of Stamford, close to the border of Darien and New Canaan, Springdale is noted for its "small town feel". Hope Street serves as Springdale's center, and is lined with various shops, restaurants, and apartments. Much of the neighborhood also runs parallel to the New Canaan Branch, and the area is served by Springdale station.

== Toponymy ==
The neighborhood has been called "Springdale" since 1868, according to a 1982 publication by Rosemary Hickey Burns of the Stamford Historical Society. Springdale was chosen as a name to invoke the local waters along which the Europeans settled (the Noroton River). The area was also known by various older archaic European names, such as "Shittim Plains", "Greedy Ridge", "Black Swamp", "Ye Second Run", and "Broad Brook". The area also had a name of unknown etymology, "Shino".

The area also had a Native American name, recorded as "Hequetch", "Hecquitts", "Hecwitts", "Hacketts", and other similar variations. This Native American name would continue to be used in official town records through 1870, and local newspapers used the name into the early 1900s. The name's origin language and meaning remains disputed.

== History ==
According to local historian Rosemary Hickey Burns, the area was first purchased by Europeans in 1640, in a deal which encompassed all of present-day Stamford, as well as some surrounding areas. The area of present-day Springdale was settled in 1641.

Following boundary disputes, local European settlers and Native Americans revised their land treaty in 1655, but without exact details and descriptors. On January 7, 1667, the Europeans and Native Americans signed another treaty, which this time included distinct place names. The treaty specifically ceded "Hequetch", an Anglicized version of a Native American name for the area of present-day Springdale, to the European settlers.

Following the codification of the area's land rights, Europeans settled the area en masse during the first few years of the 18th century. Hequetch was a largely agrarian area, with many orchards and cider mills. Major crops in the area include wheat, oats, and corn; oak and walnut timber were the area's main lumber products.

During the Revolutionary War, most Springdale residents were loyalists.

The area's first shop, a blacksmith located on the north side of Woodway Road and Hope Street, opened in 1792. The first store recorded in the area known as Shittim Plains was in existence by 1811.

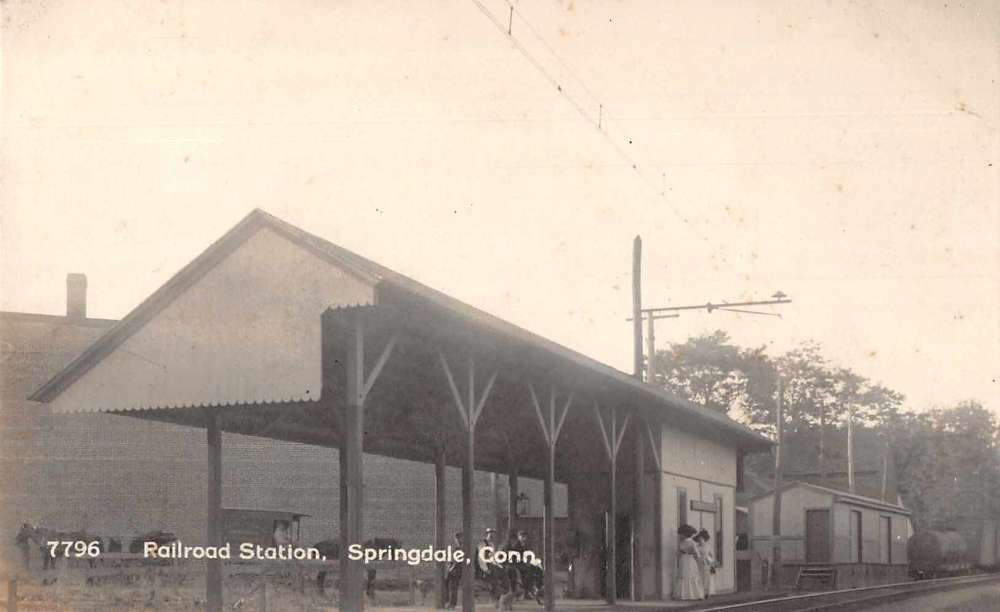
Springdale station, sometime between 1907 and 1915

The area saw a number of important constructions in the mid-19th century, coinciding with the opening of the New Canaan Railroad. A school was built in 1854 at the site of the present Springdale Elementary School, in the area then known as "Shino". The Methodist Church was dedicated in 1876 and the Episcopal Church in 1868. The train made its first trip from Stamford to New Canaan on July 4, 1868. Around this time, a local post office was established, and the name "Springdale" became officially recognized for the area.

The city of Stamford had sought to consolidate many of the smaller municipalities in the area beginning in the early 20th century. Springdale, however, resisted this effort until 1949.

The early and mid-20th century saw a large boom in housing construction, including many Cape Cod style houses.

Beginning in the 1980s, the area along Hope Street saw the construction of many small condominium complexes.

During the early 21st century, parts of the neighborhood along Hope Street, a major commercial center, were rezoned to discourage more obtrusive parking, and to enable the development of mixed-use buildings.

== Geography ==
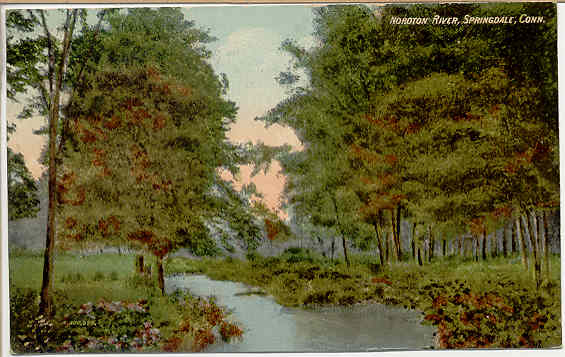
Noroton River, about 1911

Being a neighborhood with no distinct administrative status, Springdale does not have clearly defined boundaries. Springdale is located within the eastern portion of Stamford, with the center of Springdale is located along a section of Hope Street, which is home to much of the neighborhood's shops, restaurants, and an increasing number of multi-family apartments. Much of the neighborhood also runs parallel to the New Canaan Branch of the Metro-North New Haven Line.

The City of Stamford's "Neighborhood Statistical Area" for Springdale places it north of Glenbrook and Belltown, south and east of Turn of River and Newfield, and east of Ridgeway and Bulls' Head. To its east is northern Darien.

Some consider Springdale to be to the east of Belltown.

The area of Springdale is largely hilly.

== Demographics ==
Due to the neighborhood's lack of fixed boundaries, demographic data regarding Springdale can be varied. A 2013 piece by The New York Times suggested the area had a population of "about 12,000", whereas the City of Stamford's "Neighborhood Statistical Area" for Springdale estimated a population of 8,021 during 2015 to 2019.

The city's "Neighborhood Statistical Area" reports that 62.3% of Springdale's population is non-Hispanic White, 8.9% is non-Hispanic Asian, 6.9% is non-Hispanic Black, 2.8% is non-Hispanic of another race, and 19.1% is Hispanic.

== Economy ==
Nearly all of Springdale's commercial and industrial activity lies along the eastern border of the neighborhood, along Hope Street and the New Canaan Branch.

The city's 2019 "Neighborhood Statistical Area" publication for Springdale reports a per capita income of $47,223, lower than the Stamford average, but still higher than Connecticut's average. The publication reported an unemployment rate of 9.2%, the second highest in Stamford, and well above the city and state averages. The publication also found that 48.4% of the neighborhood's residents 25 and older have a bachelor's degree or higher, in line with the city average and slightly higher than the state average.

Both Sacred Heart University of Fairfield and the University of Bridgeport have conducted classes at "campuses" (rented space for classrooms) in Springdale near the railroad station. The Riverbend Office Park and Omega Engineering Inc. are also near the railroad station.

== Government institutions ==
The neighborhood is served by Springdale Elementary School and Dolan Middle School. Local students attend the nearby Stamford High School.

The Stamford Fire Rescue Department's Fire Station # 7, as well as the Springdale Volunteer Fire Department, serve the neighborhood.

The Weed Memorial & Hollander Branch of the city library system is located in Springdale, along Hope Street.

== Parks and recreation ==
Springdale is home to a park with a playground and Little League field, which has lights for nighttime games. It has become one of the premier Little League fields in all of Connecticut, playing host to many summertime "All-Star" Little League games from all over the region.

== Local landmarks ==
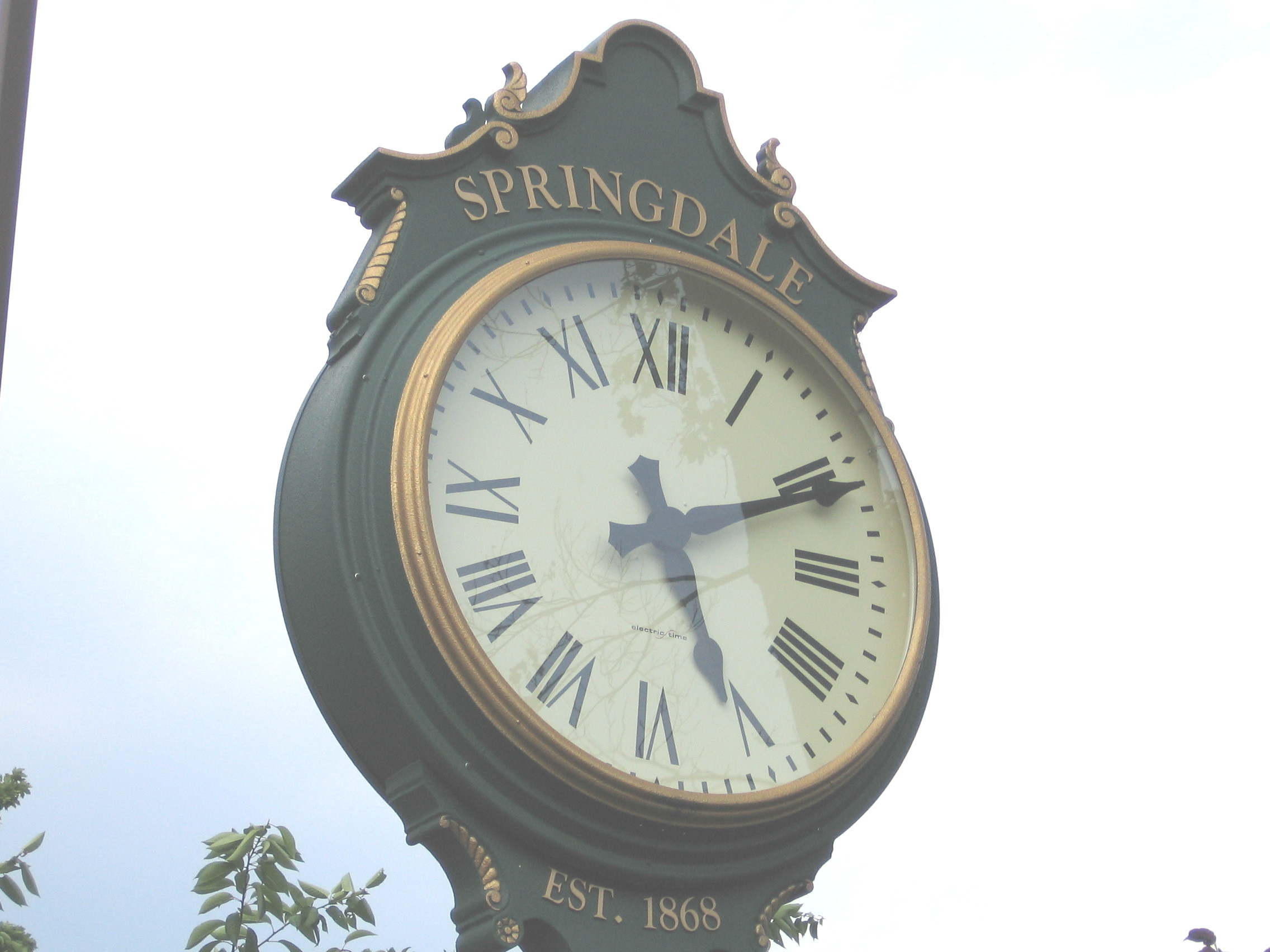
Pedestal clock at entrance to railroad station, Hope Street ("EST. 1868" when station opened)

- Scofield-Hoyt farmhouse, Eden Road, built in 1868 by John Scofield and Catherine Hoyt Scofield (on land inherited from Catherine's father) as part of a farm that also covered 37 acres (150,000 m^{2}) across the street (land from the estate of Peter Scofield). Original wood in the home was taken from that land. The couple's three children, James, Frances and Ann Augusta, never married and all lived in the house till 1902. Some of the remaining original features of the house are the pegged post-and-beam frame, the front six-over-six windows, the hardware on the doors, rough-hewn ceiling beams and dry-laid stone walls.
- State Cinema, a movie theater
- Twin Rinks ice rinks, which has two regulation-size (200 feet by 85 feet) rinks at 1063 Hope St.

== Transportation ==
The neighborhood is served by the Springdale station, along the New Canaan Branch of the Metro-North New Haven Line.

== See also ==
- Glenbrook
- Springdale station
- Stamford
