= John Hite House =

Historic house in Virginia, United States

- U.S. National Register of Historic Places
- Virginia Landmarks Register
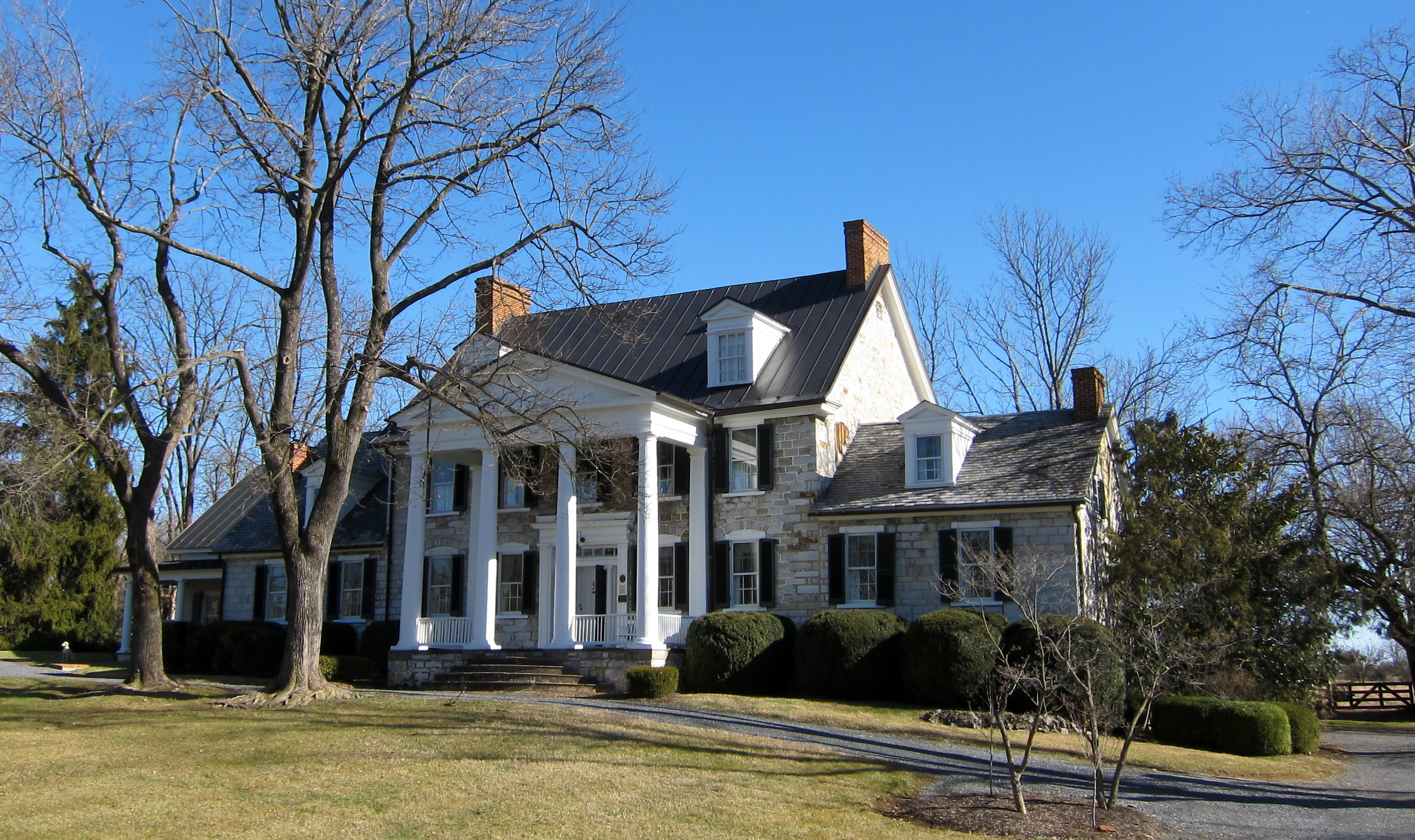
- John Hite House, or Springdale, January 2017

- Location within Virginia Location within the United States
- Location: US 11, near/at? Bartonsville, Virginia
- Coordinates: 39°06′34.8″N 78°12′13.9″W
- Area: 12 acres (4.9 ha)
- Built: 1753, portico is 19th-century, pre-Civil War James Taylor, With Sheridan Up the Shenandoah, View of Bartonsville and Springdale, 1864. reproduced in Colt p. 328.
- Built by: Hite, John
- Architectural style: Colonial Revival, Greek Revival
- NRHP reference No.: 82004558
- VLR No.: 034-0127

Significant dates
- Added to NRHP: July 8, 1982
- Designated VLR: April 21, 1981

John Hite House, also known as Springdale, is a historic home located at Bartonsville, Frederick County, Virginia. The original house was built in 1753, and is of native limestone laid in irregular ashlar with some random-coursed limestone rubble used on its secondary walls. The stone was quarried from a nearby field. The house faced east, overlooking the Indian Trail/Great Valley Road, where Jost Hite's tavern was situated at the ford of the Opequon Creek. The Springdale property was originally the home of Jost Hite, the earliest white settler in the lower Shenandoah Valley. Jost Hite was Pennsylvania Dutch and moved to the Valley in August 1731. His son, Colonel John I. Hite, built the Springdale house. Also on the property are the contributing stone ruins of what is believed to be Jost Hite's tavern/house of the 1730s, a stone shed, and small wood-frame spring house. The house and 288 acres were sold March 20, 1802 to Richard Peters Barton (1763-1821), a native of Lancaster Pa. who had spent some years in Dinwiddie County, Va., before moving to Frederick County c. 1798. [Frederick County Deed Book S.C.4, p. 484.] The house passed to his son Richard Walker Barton (1799-1859) and in 1858 to another son, David Walker Barton (1801-1863), remaining in the Barton family until 1873. There is a small Barton family cemetery on the property. When the Valley Turnpike was chartered in 1834, the road was laid out to run on the west side of Springdale (so that the Opequon Creek could be bridged rather than forded). Soon thereafter, the house was reoriented to face the Turnpike, and the Richard W. Bartons built the then-fashionable Greek Revival four-bay, two-story portico. [Garland W. Quarles, "Some Old Houses in Frederick County, Virginia", Winchester, 1990. Revised ed. PP. 131–135.]

[The house appears in an 1873 photo and an 1864 sketch by James Taylor in Colt, Margaretta Barton, Defend the Valley, pp. x1 and 328.

The house was listed on the National Register of Historic Places in 1982.

== See also ==
- National Register of Historic Places listings in Frederick County, Virginia
