= Springdale Historic District =

Springdale Historic District may refer to:

- Springdale Historic District (New Hope, Pennsylvania), listed on the National Register of Historic Places in Bucks County, Pennsylvania
- Springdale Historic District (York, Pennsylvania), listed on the National Register of Historic Places in York County, Pennsylvania
