= Springdale Mill Complex =

- U.S. National Register of Historic Places
- Virginia Landmarks Register
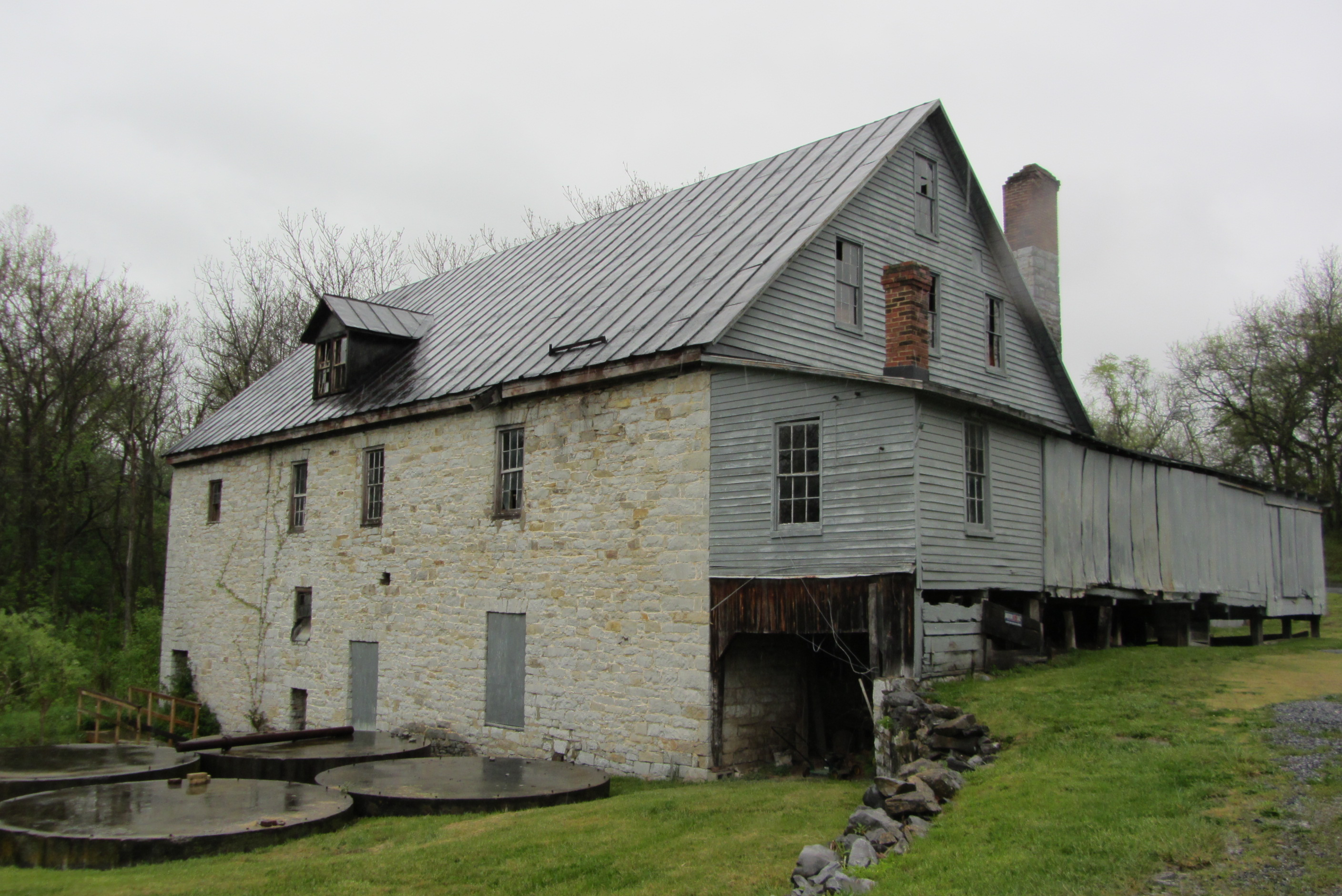
- Springdale Mill, April 2012

- Location within Virginia Location within the United States
- Location: US 11, near Bartonsville, Virginia
- Coordinates: 39°06′34″N 78°12′23″W
- Area: 4.5 acres (1.8 ha)
- Built: 1788
- Built by: Brown, David
- NRHP reference No.: 82004559
- VLR No.: 034-0128

Significant dates
- Added to NRHP: July 8, 1982
- Designated VLR: March 17, 1981

Springdale Mill Complex, also known as Springdale Flour Mill, is a historic grist mill complex located near Bartonsville, Frederick County, Virginia. The mill was built about 1788, and is constructed of coursed rubble limestone with wood-frame end gables. Associated with the mill are a number of outbuildings which were erected in the late 19th and early 20th centuries, a 2 1/2-story rubble limestone residence, and a 2 1/2-story wood-frame residence.

It was listed on the National Register of Historic Places in 1982.

== See also ==
- National Register of Historic Places listings in Frederick County, Virginia
