= Springdale station =

Metro-North Railroad station in Connecticut

Springdale
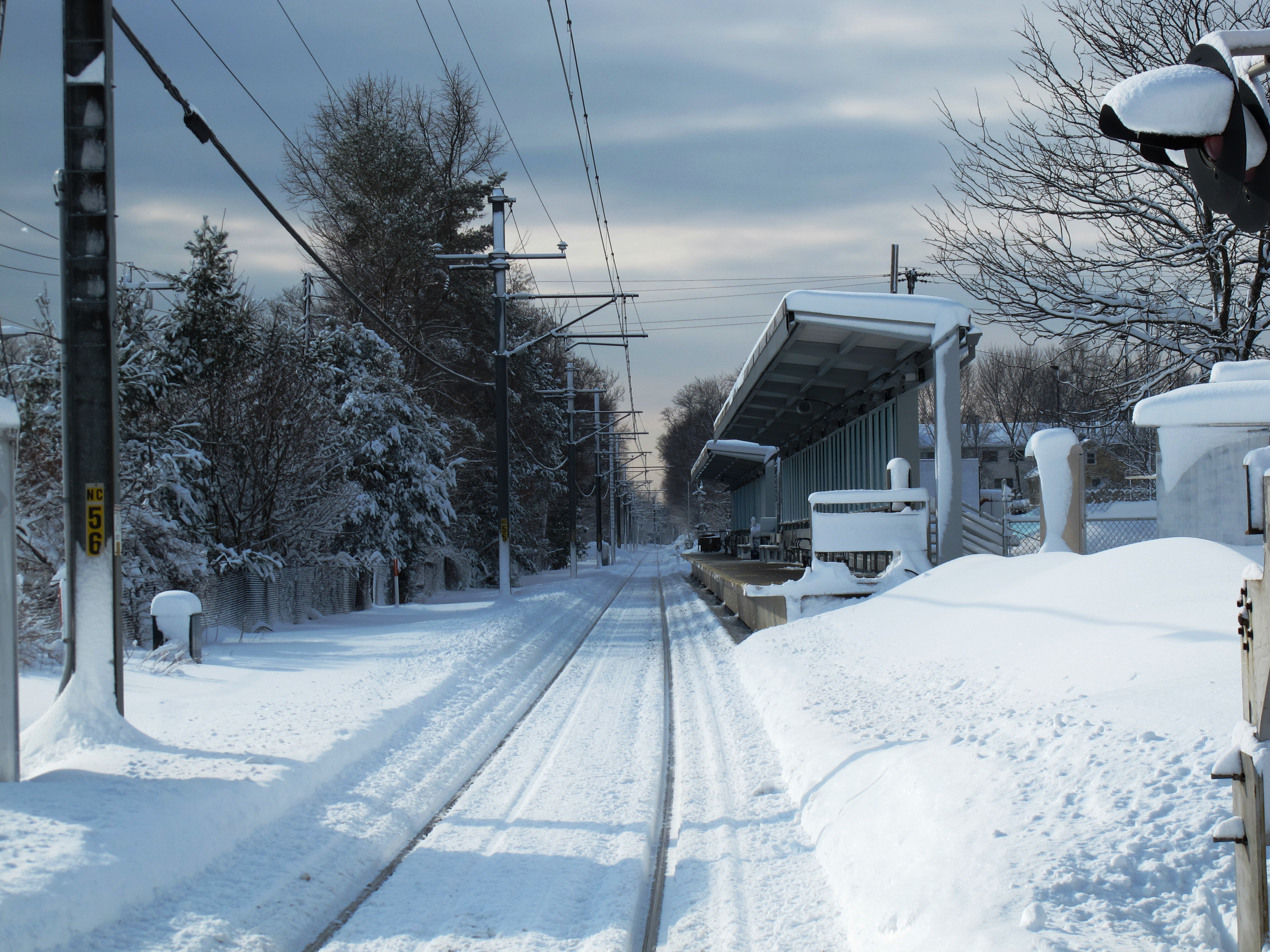
- Springdale station in January 2011

General information
- Location: 886 Hope Street; Stamford, Connecticut
- Coordinates: 41.0888°N 73.5178°W
- Owner: ConnDOT
- Operator: ConnDOT and Metro-North Railroad
- Platforms: 1 side platform
- Tracks: 1
- Connections: CT Transit Stamford: 334, 349

Construction
- Accessible: yes

Other information
- Fare zone: 31

History
- Opened: 1868
- Rebuilt: 1972

Passengers
- 2018: 459 daily boardings

Services
Preceding station	Metro-North Railroad	Following station
Glenbrook toward Stamford or Grand Central	New Canaan Branch	Talmadge Hill toward New Canaan
Location

Springdale station is a commuter rail station on the New Canaan Branch of the Metro-North Railroad New Haven Line in Springdale, Stamford, Connecticut. The station opened in 1868, and was rebuilt in 1972.

== History ==
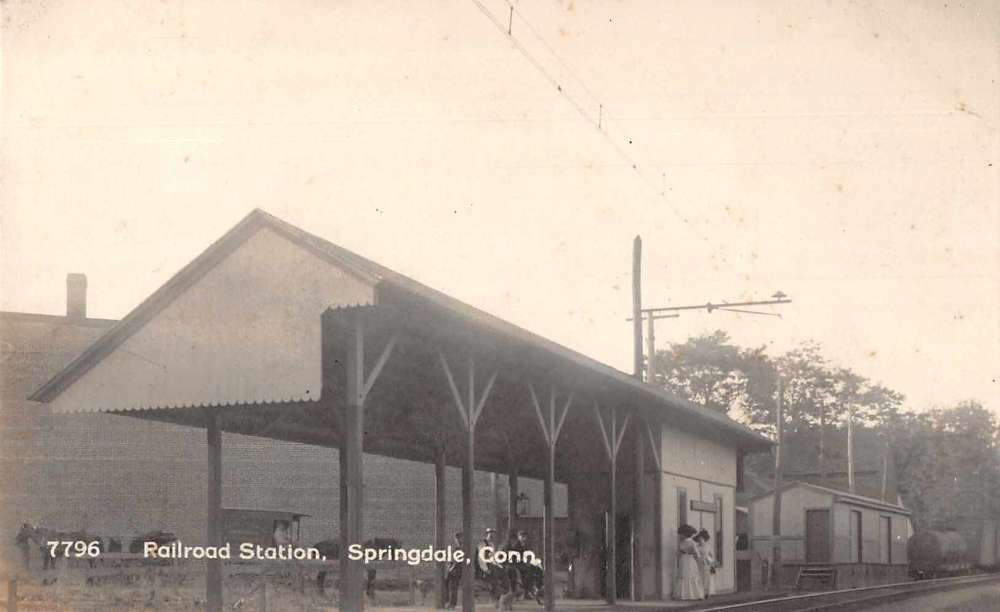
Early-20th-century postcard of the station

The Springdale station began as a stop on the New Canaan Railroad, which was chartered May 1866 as a short branch of the New York and New Haven Railroad. The line opened on July 4, 1868. As with the rest of the New Haven Railroad, the station was acquired by Penn Central Railroad in 1969. The station's staffed ticket office closed on January 15, 1972. Springdale station was reconstructed 1/10 mile (0.16 km) south of its previous location in 1972 in order to accommodate the new M2 Cosmopolitan railcars.

By 2010, after condominiums were built on nearby Camp Avenue, the station became more crowded. In April 2010, construction started on a 400-foot, $1 million canopy on the station platform. Gar-San Corporation of Watertown won the $1.87 million contract for the project. (The company was to build an identical canopy at the Stratford train station.) A large part of the expense came from having the foundation for the canopy to be drilled into the ground because of space constraints. Completion of the project was expected in December.

== Station layout ==
The station has one four-car-long high-level side platform to the west of the single track. The station has a ramp to the platforms, but it was built before the Americans with Disabilities Act and may not meet ADA accessibility requirements. The station is owned and operated by the Connecticut Department of Transportation (ConnDOT), with some responsibilities delegated to Metro-North.

A parking lot is located at the west side of the station off Hope Street. Station parking is controlled by Stamford city government, which owns most of the parking lot. The state owns a much smaller parking area at the south end of the station. The parking lot has landscaping and a "period pedestal clock".
