= Spring Dale, West Virginia =

- Unincorporated community
- Location within West Virginia Location within the United States
- Coordinates: 37°52′47″N 80°48′12″W
- Country: United States
- State: West Virginia
- County: Fayette
- Elevation: 2,746 ft (837 m)
- Time zone: UTC-5 (Eastern (EST))
  - Summer (DST): UTC-4 (EDT)
- ZIP code: 25986
- Area codes: 304 & 681
- GNIS feature ID: 1547188

Spring Dale is an unincorporated community in Fayette County, West Virginia, United States. Spring Dale is located on West Virginia Route 20, 3 miles (4.8 km) northeast of Meadow Bridge. Spring Dale has a post office with ZIP code 25986.

The community was so named for the springs near the original town site.
