= New Canaan station =

Metro-North Railroad station in Connecticut

New Canaan
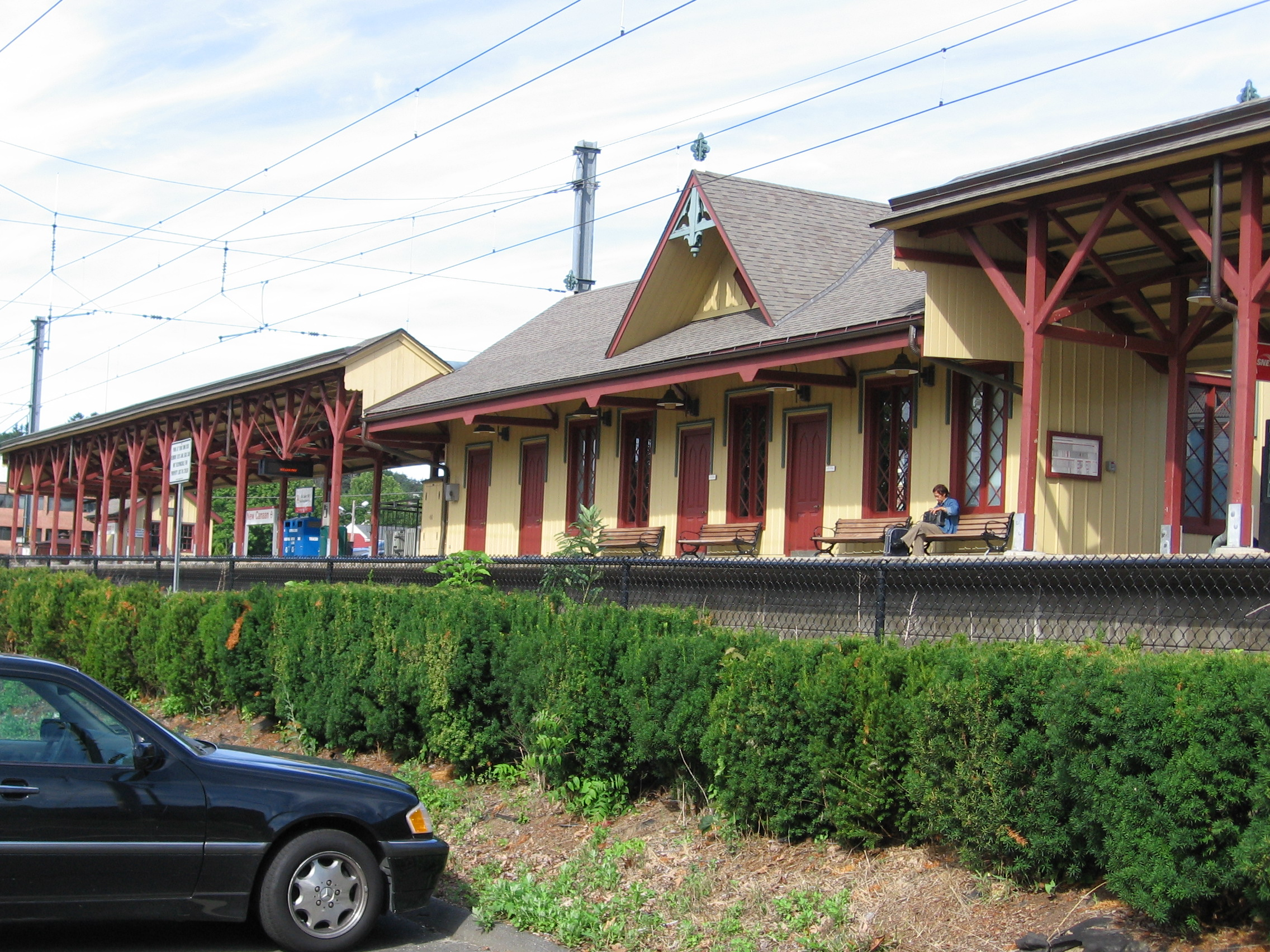
- Trackside view of New Canaan station in 2007

General information
- Location: 198 Elm Street; New Canaan, Connecticut
- Coordinates: 41.1463°N 73.4956°W
- Owner: Connecticut Department of Transportation
- Operator: Town of New Canaan
- Platforms: 1 side platform
- Tracks: 3

Construction
- Parking: Yes
- Accessible: yes

Other information
- Fare zone: 31

History
- Opened: 1868

Passengers
- 2018: 1,134 daily boardings

Services
Preceding station	Metro-North Railroad	Following station
Talmadge Hill toward Stamford or Grand Central	New Canaan Branch	Terminus
Location

New Canaan station is a commuter rail station on the New Canaan Branch of the Metro-North Railroad's New Haven Line in New Canaan, Connecticut.

== History ==
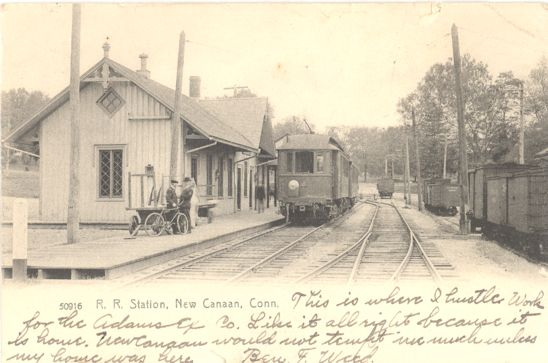
A 1906 postcard depicting the station

The New Canaan Railroad was chartered in May 1866 as a short branch of the New York & New Haven Railroad from its main line at Stamford to New Canaan. The branch and this station opened on July 4, 1868.

The town of New Canaan bought an option for a site on Old Stamford Road in March 1955, which would allow the town to build a new station with a parking lot, and the New York, New Haven and Hartford Railroad announced plans for the new station and parking lot that September. The railroad and town signed an agreement in 1958 to build a new station at Fairty Orchards, about 0.5 miles (0.80 km) south of the old New Canaan station, and the railroad asked the town of New Canaan to acquire the existing New Canaan station the following January. The railroad and the town agreed on final plans in June 1959, and officials had announced their plan to build the station at Fairty Orchards by that September. Residents narrowly voted against the planned station that November, and they voted down the plan again in 1961 by a much wider margin.

On July 13, 1976, two trains collided at the New Canaan station, killing two and injuring 29. In October 1976, the CDOT released their report, which only blamed the engineer of the northbound train for excessive speed. The National Transportation Safety Board also recommended that an automatic safety system be installed near the New Canaan station.

The station platform was closed for several months in 1982 because it was crumbling; during that time, only the last two or three cars opened their doors at the station.

In 1998, the state began a 10-year lease (ending June 30, 2008) to the town 2.35 acres (9,500 m^{2}) at both the Talmadge Hill and New Canaan stations, allowing the town to perform some maintenance, repairs and cleaning while the state retains responsibility and control over major structural renovations and repairs. Money collected for parking goes into a special fund to be used for station-related purposes with the state's approval, and the state also must approve parking-fee regulations. The town has the option of renewing the lease for another 10-year term.

On July 7, 2010, the ticket office at the station was closed, with vending machines on the platforms still available.

On the morning of February 14, 2023, a train collided at low speed with a bumping-block device at the station, causing damage to one M8 railcar and to the sidewalk at the intersection of Park and Elm Streets. The train's only occupants – an engineer and a conductor – sustained minor injuries.

== Station layout ==
The station has one five-car-long high-level side platform to the west of the tracks. The station is served by 3 tracks from the New Canaan Branch. Two tracks east of the platform track are used for train storage.

The station has commuter parking in several parking lots within a short walk from the station. There are two lots near the station with numbered spaces for daily parking.
