= Springdale Township, Valley County, Nebraska =

Springdale Township
- Township
- Location in Valley County
- Coordinates: 41°37′07″N 098°48′36″W
- Country: United States
- State: Nebraska
- County: Valley

Area
  - Total: 30.69 sq mi (79.48 km^{2})
  - Land: 30.34 sq mi (78.59 km^{2})
  - Water: 0.34 sq mi (0.88 km^{2}) 1.11%
- Elevation: 2,037 ft (621 m)

Population (2020)
  - Total: 32
  - Density: 1.1/sq mi (0.41/km^{2})
- GNIS feature ID: 0838267

Springdale Township is one of fifteen townships in Valley County, Nebraska, United States. The population was 32 at the 2020 census. A 2021 estimate placed the township's population at 32.

== See also ==
- County government in Nebraska
