= Springdale Township, Redwood County, Minnesota =

Springdale Township, Minnesota
- Township
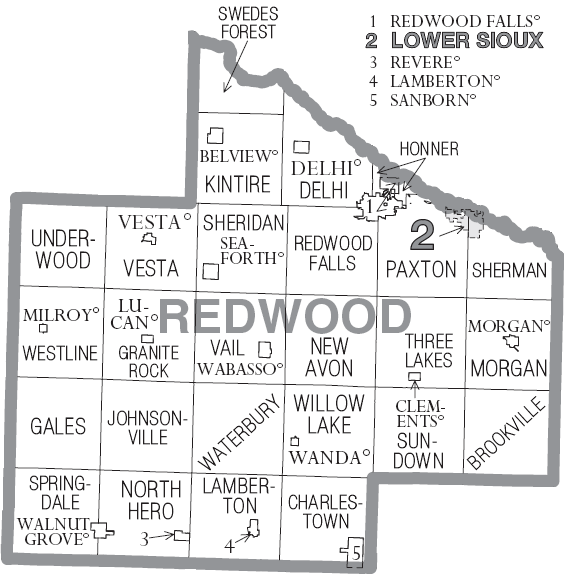
- Cities and townships of Redwood County
- Coordinates: 44°13′52″N 95°31′32″W
- Country: United States
- State: Minnesota
- County: Redwood

Area
  - Total: 35.9 sq mi (92.9 km^{2})
  - Land: 35.8 sq mi (92.7 km^{2})
  - Water: 0.039 sq mi (0.1 km^{2})
- Elevation: 1,240 ft (378 m)

Population (2000)
  - Total: 215
  - Density: 6.0/sq mi (2.3/km^{2})
- Time zone: UTC-6 (Central (CST))
  - Summer (DST): UTC-5 (CDT)
- FIPS code: 27-61798
- GNIS feature ID: 0665669

Springdale Township is one of the twenty-six townships of Redwood County, Minnesota, United States. The population was 215 at the 2000 census.

Springdale Township was organized in 1873, and named for the various springs and dales within its borders.

== Geography ==
According to the United States Census Bureau, the township has a total area of 35.9 square miles (92.9 km^{2}), of which 35.8 square miles (92.7 km^{2}) is land and 0.1 square mile (0.1 km^{2}) (0.14%) is water.

Part of the city of Walnut Grove is located in Springdale Township.

== Demographics ==
As of the census of 2000, there were 215 people, 77 households, and 64 families residing in the township. The population density was 6.0 people per square mile (2.3/km^{2}). There were 88 housing units at an average density of 2.5/sq mi (0.9/km^{2}). The racial makeup of the township was 98.60% White and 1.40% Asian.

There were 77 households, out of which 36.4% had children under the age of 18 living with them, 77.9% were married couples living together, 2.6% had a female householder with no husband present, and 15.6% were non-families. 15.6% of all households were made up of individuals, and 9.1% had someone living alone who was 65 years of age or older. The average household size was 2.79 and the average family size was 3.05.

In the township the population was spread out, with 30.2% under the age of 18, 3.7% from 18 to 24, 25.1% from 25 to 44, 26.0% from 45 to 64, and 14.9% who were 65 years of age or older. The median age was 42 years. For every 100 females, there were 95.5 males. For every 100 females age 18 and over, there were 100.0 males.

The median income for a household in the township was $38,958, and the median income for a family was $42,813. Males had a median income of $30,250 versus $15,875 for females. The per capita income for the township was $19,001. None of the families and 0.5% of the population were living below the poverty line.
