= Stamford Transportation Center =

Railroad station in Connecticut

Stamford
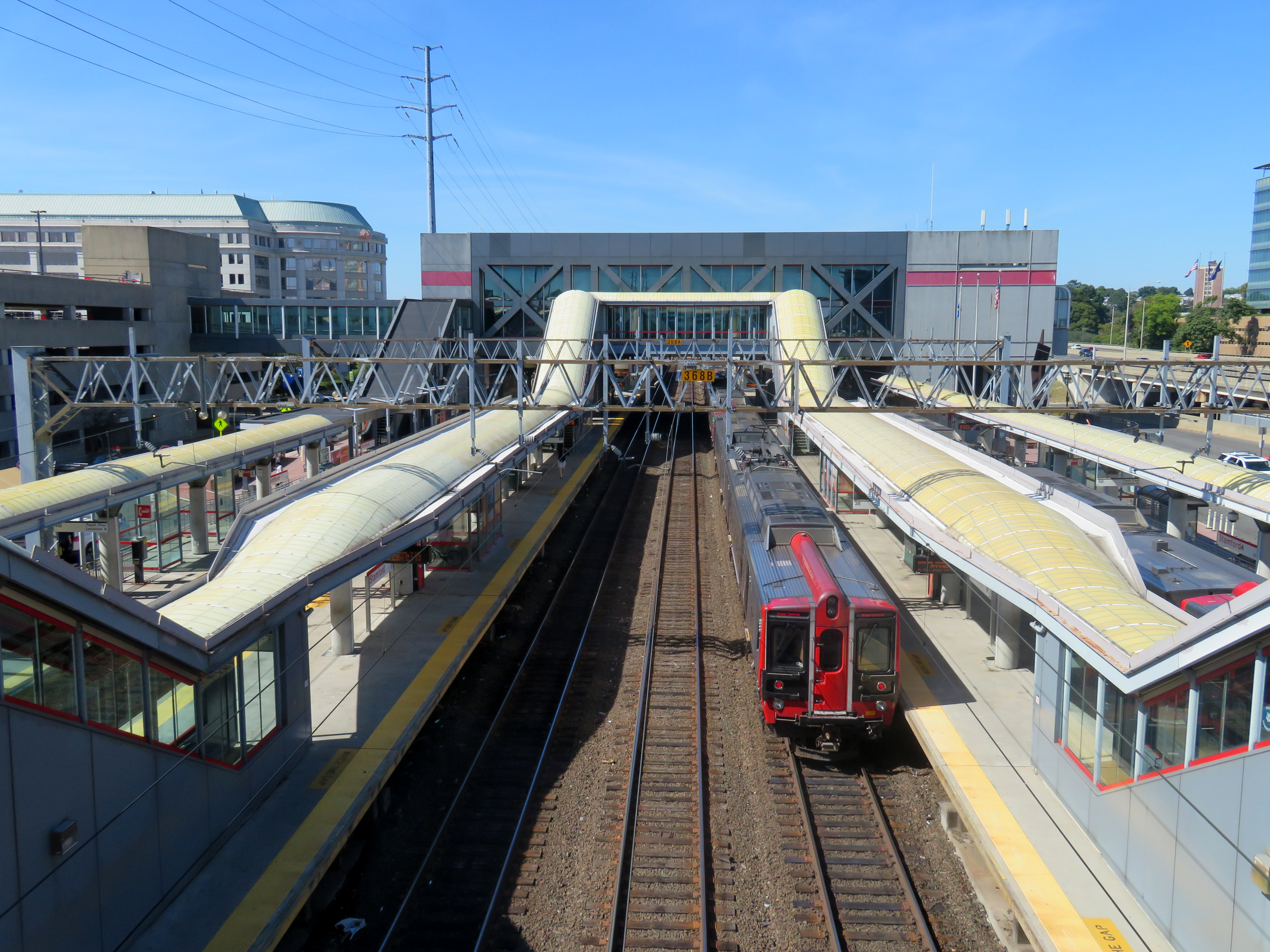
- New Haven Line train at Stamford Transportation Center in 2018

General information
- Location: 490 Washington Boulevard (30 South State Street); Stamford, Connecticut; United States
- Coordinates: 41°02′49″N 73°32′29″W
- Owner: ConnDOT
- Line: ConnDOT New Haven Line (Northeast Corridor)
- Platforms: 2 island platforms 2 side platforms (plus 1 side platform under construction)
- Tracks: 5 (plus 1 under construction)
- Connections: CT Transit Stamford: 311, 312, 313, 321, 324, 326, 327, 328, 331, 333, 334, 335, 336, 341, 342, 344, 345, 351, 971

Construction
- Parking: 1,500 spaces
- Accessible: Yes

Other information
- Station code: Amtrak: STM
- IATA code: ZTF
- Fare zone: 16 (Metro-North)
- Website: stamfordstation.ctrail.com

History
- Opened: December 25, 1848
- Rebuilt: 1861, 1890s, 1987, 2004

Passengers
- FY 2025: 398,958 annually (Amtrak)
- 2018: 15,216 daily boardings (Metro-North)

Services
Preceding station	Amtrak	Following station
New York toward Washington, D.C.	Acela	New Haven toward Boston South
New York toward Washington, D.C.	Vermonter	Bridgeport toward St. Albans
New Rochelle toward Norfolk, Newport News or Roanoke	Northeast Regional	Bridgeport toward Boston South or Springfield
Preceding station	CT Rail	Following station
Terminus	Shore Line East limited weekday service	Bridgeport toward New London
Preceding station	Metro-North Railroad	Following station
Old Greenwich toward Grand Central	New Haven Line	Terminus
Harlem–125th Street toward Grand Central	New Haven Line	Noroton Heights toward New Haven or New Haven State Street
Terminus	New Canaan Branch	Glenbrook toward New Canaan
Greenwich weekday service toward Grand Central	New Canaan Branch	Glenbrook toward New Canaan
Harlem–125th Street toward Grand Central	Danbury Branch weekday service	Noroton Heights toward Danbury
Terminus	Danbury Branch weekday service	South Norwalk toward Danbury
Special events service
Preceding station	Metro-North Railroad	Following station
Greenwich toward Yankees–East 153rd Street	New Haven Line Yankee Clipper	Terminus
Yankees–East 153rd Street Terminus	New Haven Line Yankee Clipper	Noroton Heights toward New Haven
Former services
Preceding station	Amtrak	Following station
Rye toward Washington, D.C.	Montrealer	Bridgeport toward Montreal
New York Terminus	Cape Codder	New Haven toward Hyannis
Preceding station	New York, New Haven and Hartford Railroad	Following station
Sound Beach toward New York	Main Line	Glenbrook toward New Haven
Location

Stamford station, officially known as the Stewart B. McKinney Transportation Center or the Stamford Transportation Center, is a major railroad station in the city of Stamford, Connecticut, serving passengers traveling on Metro-North Railroad's New Haven Line, and Amtrak's Northeast Corridor. In addition, it is a major bus terminal for Peter Pan, and CTtransit buses. In 2018, the station averaged over 15,000 Metro-North boardings on weekdays, making it the second-busiest station on the network, behind Grand Central Terminal. Its official name honors politician Stewart McKinney.

The split for the New Canaan Branch is just northeast of the station. Downtown Stamford is directly north of the station; the entrance to the station on the north side is marked by the Stamford Cone, a work of public sculpture situated at the top of Gateway Commons, while the South End is located directly south.

== Station layout ==
The station has a 9-car-long side platform on the south side, a 10-car-long platform on the north side and two high-level 12-car-long island platforms. The main station concourse straddles the tracks of the Northeast Corridor, and contains the ticket booth, a passenger waiting area, and shops. Below the platform level is an MTA police station, other shops, a Peter Pan office and CT Transit Customer Information Center. Stairs and escalators lead to the platform level. On the south side of the station, across an access street, is a large parking garage connected to the concourse by one pedestrian bridge and directly connected to the east end of the platforms by a second bridge (both bridges connect to Level 4 of the garage).

A bus station is located just to the north of the train station, underneath a large bridge carrying Interstate 95. Taxis pick up passengers at a stand on the south side of the station. A car-rental agency is located southwest of the station building.

== Services ==
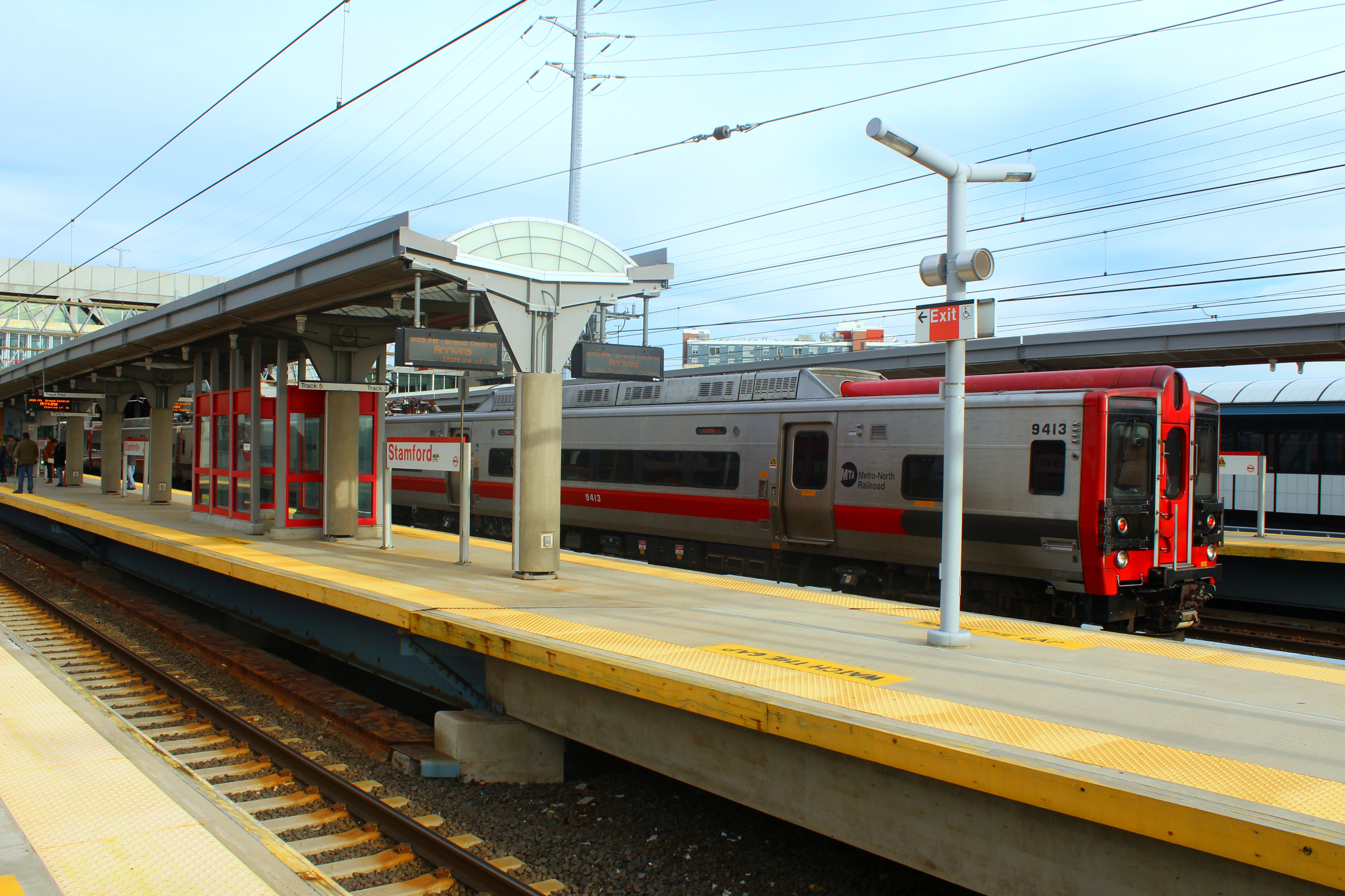
Stamford Transportation Center with a Metro-North M8 train headed towards Grand Central.

Stamford receives very frequent rail service on the New Haven Line. During peak hours, trains at Stamford come in intervals as little as three or seven minutes apart. Reverse commute trains during rush hours also operate relatively frequently, at intervals of ten to twenty minutes. Off-peak trains in both directions arrive at Stamford every thirty to forty minutes, but usually within a half-hour of each other. Stamford is the busiest Metro-North Railroad station other than Grand Central Terminal, averaging 15,000 boardings on weekdays in 2018.

The station divides the New Haven Line into an "inner zone" and an "outer zone". "Inner zone" trains run locally, serving all or most stations between Grand Central and Stamford. "Outer zone" trains run express between Grand Central and Stamford (with Harlem 125th Street as the only intermediate stop for most trains), before running locally between Stamford and New Haven. This gives passengers the ability to transfer between "inner zone" and "outer zone" trains at Stamford. In addition, New Canaan Branch shuttle trains originate in Stamford, where passengers can transfer to mainline trains.

In the 2000s, Stamford and Greenwich received increasing numbers of reverse commuters who work in Stamford but live in New York City. Reverse commuting doubled from 1997 to 2007, with 1,900 daily reverse commuters by 2007. Metro-North added trains and express service to serve these commuters. As financial companies moved to Stamford from Manhattan, some employees became reverse commuters. Larger companies farther away than a few minutes walk from the station routinely provided shuttle service for their workers.

As of 2014, Stamford has been a central stop for a special "Yankee Clipper" Train. The direct train runs to and from all weeknight and weekend games to Yankees–East 153rd Street to serve New York Yankees baseball games and New York City FC soccer matches at Yankee Stadium. The trains are timed to arrive between 45 minutes and 2 hours prior to the start of the game, and depart between 20 and 45 minutes after they end.

Due to ridership growth, ConnDOT announced on March 19, 2007, that it would extend more Shore Line East trains to Stamford during peak hours. To coincide with the extension of this service, Metro-North added another five trains on the New Haven Line to cope with the increases in passenger demand at Stamford. Shore Line East service to Stamford was suspended indefinitely on March 16, 2020, due to the coronavirus pandemic. Service resumed on October 7, 2024.

Amtrak also operates three routes which stop at Stamford: the Acela, the only high-speed rail service in the United States, the Northeast Regional, providing local service along the Northeast Corridor, on which Stamford is a vital station, and the Vermonter, the only train from Connecticut that goes to Vermont. Stamford is now the second-busiest Amtrak station in Connecticut, after New Haven's Union Station.

== History ==
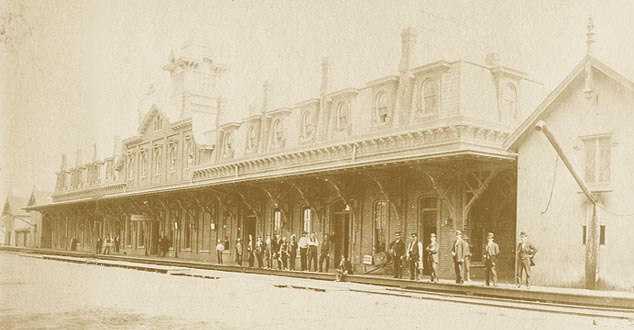
The 1861-built depot in 1868

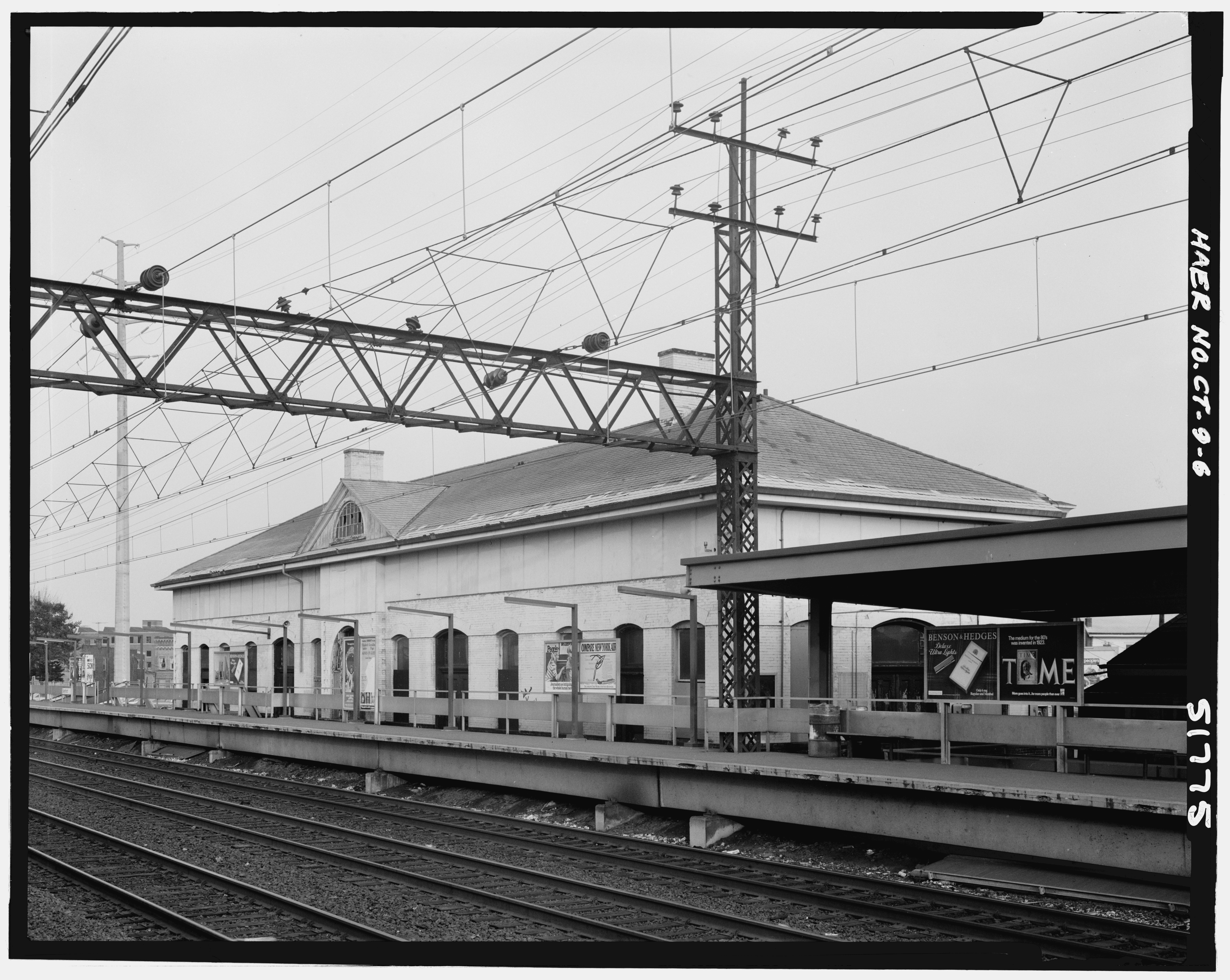
The 1890s-built station in 1983

Regular daily train service began in Stamford on January 1, 1849. In 1867, a depot was built one block east of the present location. The railroad at that time consisted of two tracks and passed through town on ground level (crossing the streets at grade). In the mid-1890s, two more tracks were added to the line and most crossings were elevated and bridged; the 1867 depot was razed and replaced.

In 1980, the Federal Railroad Administration (FRA) awarded $50 million for a new station and parking garage in Stamford. The cost was paid 70% by the FRA, 20% by the state, and 10% by the city. Construction began in 1983. Garage construction was soon halted due to cracks in support beams caused by a contractor omitting components. Additional of a support column failed to solve the issue; the FRA took over the project. The garage and station opened in 1987.

Architecture critic Paul Goldberger, writing for The New York Times in 1987, criticized the station for "a harshness almost unequaled in contemporary architecture" as well as for cost overruns and many functional failings, including the lack of shelter for the track platforms. The route from the cross-tracks waiting room to the platform was so long and indirect that passengers who waited indoors until a train's arrival was announced could not get to the platform in time to board it. Despite these issues, Stamford became the line's busiest station aside from Grand Central by 1989.

A complete renovation of the station in the early 2000s, provided for in the original design of the overhead structure, addressed the problems. The two platforms were made island platforms, capable of serving four tracks. Added features included platform canopies, stairs and escalators directly from the waiting room for the tracks, and a new platform crossover, connecting to a 1,200-space addition to the parking garage.

In 2006, the state indicated plans to replace the 1987-built garage. That plan was cancelled in 2008; by 2012, the state planned to pursue privately-funded transit-oriented development on the garage parcel, with replacement parking possibly located up to a quarter-mile away. Temporary repairs to the deteriorating original garage were made in 2015; even so, only 200 of the 727 spaces were usable by 2019.

Construction of a new 928-space, $82 million parking garage northwest of the station began in October 2021. Located over State Street includes a 320-foot (98 m)-long footbridge connecting to the main waiting room plus a ramp to the southbound (Track 5) side platform. After delay, the new garage opened on February 26, 2024. This allowed demolition of the 1980s-built garage and footbridge (at a cost of $9 million) to begin. Demolition of the footbridge took place from March 11 to late April 2024, followed by demolition of the garage. Demolition was expected to be complete by late 2024. Artist Rafael Blanco was selected in May 2025 to paint a mural on the facade of the new garage. It was finished in June 2025.

The Connecticut Department of Transportation (CTDOT) began work in 2022 on a master plan for the station and surrounding area. It was released in February 2024. In July 2025, the agency indicated that relocation of the station was being considered as part of the project. CTDOT issued a request for proposals in August 2025.
