= Lotus Flower (disambiguation) =

Lotus flower usually refers to the pink or white flower of Nelumbo nucifera, the "Indian lotus".

"Lotus flower" may also refer to a flower of any of the list of plants known as lotus, or:

== Art ==
- The flower of Nymphaea caerulea, the blue lotus (or Nymphaea lotus, the white lotus)
- Sacred lotus in religious art, a lotus flower as a religious symbol in Buddhist and Hindu art
- Lotus throne, a base for a figure in art, formed like a lotus flower in Buddhist and Hindu art

== Music ==
- Lotus Flower (Woody Shaw album), 1982
- Lotusflow3r, a 2009 album by Prince
- "Lotus Flower" (song), a 2011 song by Radiohead
- Lotus Flower, a 1999 album by Steve Turre, or its title song

== Places ==
- Lotus Flower Tower, a mountain peak in Canada

== See also ==
- Lotus Blossom (disambiguation)
- Lotus (disambiguation)
- Blue lotus (disambiguation)
- White Lotus (disambiguation)
- Sacred lotus (disambiguation)
- "Die Lotosblume", a poem written by Heinrich Heine which was put to music by Robert Schumann
- Lotosblume, a 1989 album by Die Flippers
