= Lotus =

Lotus or LOTUS may refer to:

== Botany ==
- List of plants known as lotus, a list of various botanical taxa commonly known as lotus, particularly:
  - Nelumbonaceae, a single-genus family of aquatic flowering plants, consisting of just two species; the American lotus and the better known sacred lotus, or the Indian lotus, a symbolically important Asian plant
  - Lotus (genus), a genus of terrestrial plants in the family Fabaceae
- Lotus tree, a plant in Greek and Roman mythology

== Religion ==
- Sacred lotus in religious art
- Lotus throne base for figures in Asian religious art
- Lotus Sutra, an influential Mahayana sutra
- Lotus position, a posture used in yoga, meditation and Zen Buddhism
- Lotus Temple, Baha'i House of Worship in Delhi, India
- Lotus, one of the Ashtamangala (Eight Auspicious Symbols)

== Places ==
- Lotus, California, an unincorporated community in El Dorado County, California, US
- Lotus, Indiana, an unincorporated community in Union County, Indiana, US
- Lotus, Kentucky, an unincorporated community in Bullitt County, Kentucky, US

== Businesses and organizations ==
- Lotus (guitar), an instrument manufacturer
- Lotus (magazine), a trilingual political and cultural magazine
- Lotus Bakeries, a Belgian bakery founded in 1932
- Lotus Cars, a British motor vehicle manufacturer
  - Lotus F1 Team, a British Formula One team that competed between 2012 and 2015
  - Team Lotus, a British Formula One racing team that competed between 1954 and 1994
  - Pacific Team Lotus, the successor team that resulted from a merger with Pacific and competed in Formula One in 1995
  - Lotus GP, a French GP2 and GP3 racing team sponsored by Lotus Cars
- Lotus Foods, an organic rice company
- Lotus Development, a personal computer software company, best known for:
  - Lotus Notes, collaborative software, personal information manager and e-mail client now known as IBM Notes
  - Lotus 1-2-3 spreadsheet application
- Lotus's, formerly Lotus Supercenter and Tesco Lotus, a hypermarket chain in Thailand and Malaysia operated by Charoen Pokphand Group
- Lotus TV Macau, a television channel in Macau
- Lotus, a brand of watches, part of the Festina Group
- Team Lotus (2010–11), a Malaysian Formula One racing team that began racing in 2010 as Lotus Racing and became Caterham F1 at the end of the 2011 season

== Arts, media and entertainment ==
=== Music ===
==== Artists ====
- Lotus (Australian band), a 1970s rock, pop band
- Lotus (American band), an instrumental rock band
- Lotus (Hong Kong band), a 1960s pop band

==== Albums ====
- Lotus (Christina Aguilera album) (2012), by Christina Aguilera
- Lotus (Elisa album) (2003), by Elisa
- Lotus (Little Simz album) (2025), by Little Simz
- Lotus (Santana album) (1974), by Santana
- Lotus (2009), by Haywyre
- Lotus (Soen album) (2019), by Soen
- Lotus (2022), by Pind
- Lotus (Within Destruction album) (2022), by Within Destruction

==== Songs ====
- "Lotus" (Arashi song), by Arashi
- "Lotus" (Dir En Grey song), by Dir En Grey
- "Lotus" (R.E.M. song), by R.E.M.
- "Lotus", from Cage The Elephant's debut album
- "Lotus", by Lil Uzi Vert on the album Lil Uzi Vert vs. the World 2
- "Lotus", by Minus the Bear on Planet of Ice
- "Lotus", by Susumu Hirasawa on the 1995 album Sim City

=== Other media ===
- Lotus (board game), a strategy game
- Lotus (video game series), a videogame series based on Lotus cars
- A character in the 2009 video game Nine Hours, Nine Persons, Nine Doors
- Leticia "Lotus" Madrigal, a character from the Philippine drama series Abot-Kamay na Pangarap

== Vessels ==
- Lotus (1826 ship), English ship
- Lotus (motor vessel), a houseboat yacht
- S.S. Lotus, a French steamship involved in the Lotus case criminal trial
- S.S.S. Lotus, an American sailing vessel

== People ==
- Lotus (given name)
- Lotus Blossom (born 2007) Japanese-American actress and daughter of Ernie Reyes Jr.
- Lotus de Païni (1862–1953) Italian-born painter, writer, sculptor, and occultist
- Lotus Long (1909–1990), Asian-American actress

== Other uses ==
- Law of the unconscious statistician, a statistics theorem used to calculate the expected value of a function
- Lateral olfactory tract usher substance, a protein in nerve cells promoting axon growth
- Operation Lotus (disambiguation), multiple meanings

== See also ==
- Lotus Blossom (disambiguation)
- Lotus Flower (disambiguation)
- Blue lotus (disambiguation)
- White Lotus (disambiguation)
- Lotos (disambiguation)
