= Lotus (given name) =

Given name

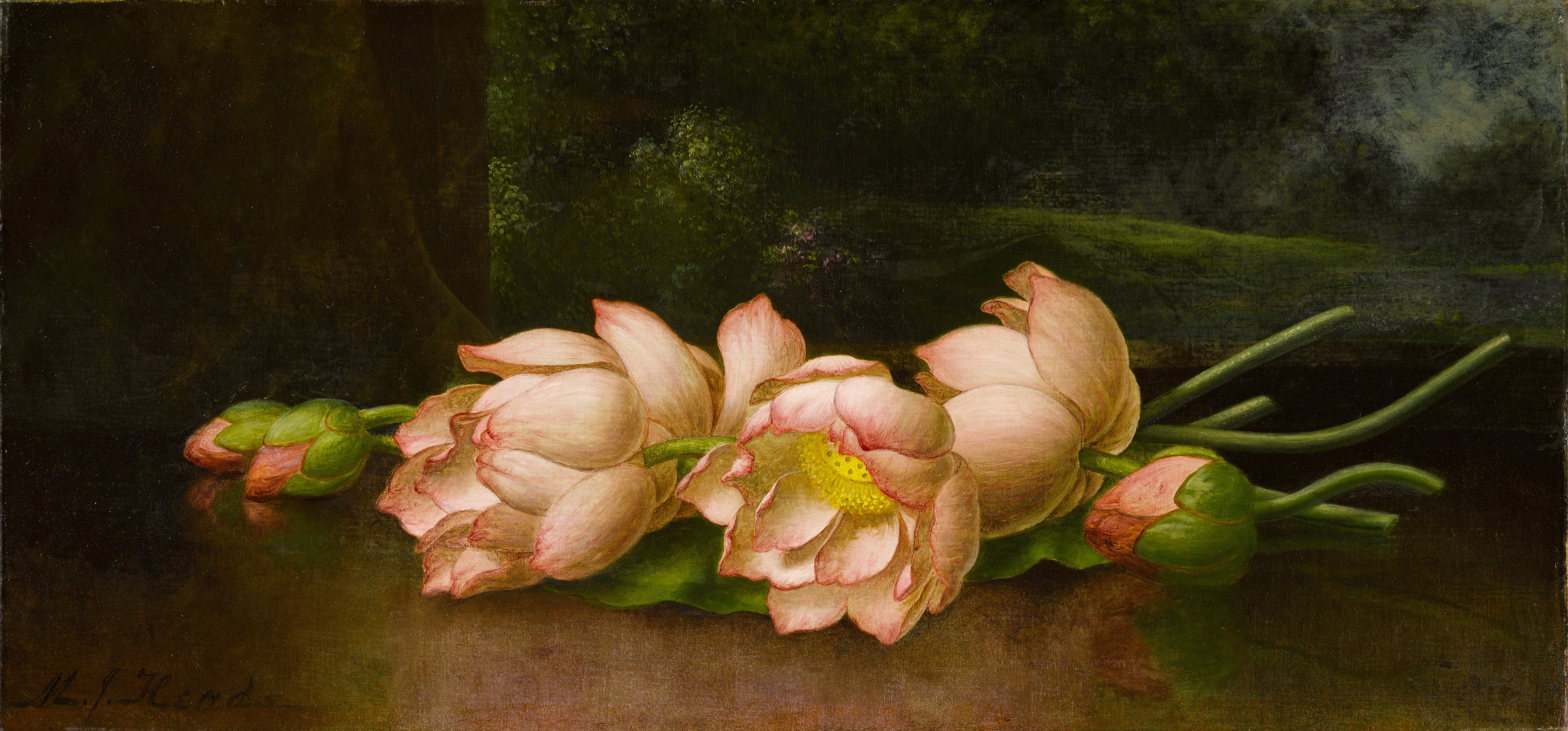
- Lotus Flowers by Martin Johnson Heade
- Gender: Unisex
- Language: English

Origin
- Meaning: “Lotus”

Lotus is a given name. It is a botanical name.

It may refer to:

== Women ==
- Lotus Blossom (born 2007), Japanese-American actress and daughter of Ernie Reyes Jr.
- Lotus Long (born Lotus Pearl Shibata; 1909 – 1990), American actress
- Lotus Mills (died 1975), American politician
- Lotus Thompson (1904–1963), Australian actress
- Lotus Weinstock (1943–1997), American comedian

== Pen name ==
- Lotus Kamal (born 1947), Bangladeshi politician and businessman
- Lotus de Païni (née Elvezia Giulia Maria Gazzotti; 1862 – 1953), Italian painter, sculptor, writer, and occultist

== Men ==
- Lotus Coffman (1875–1938), American college president
- Lotus Langley (1875–1955), American politician and lawyer

== See also ==
- Lotus (disambiguation)
