= Lotus Blossom (disambiguation) =

Lotus blossom refers to the pink or white flower of lotus plant Nelumbo nucifera. It may also refer to:

- Lotus Blossom (film), a 1921 Chinese film
- Lotus Blossom (album), a 1995 album by Kenny Burrell
- "Lotus Blossom", a 1946 composition by Billy Strayhorn
- "Lotus Blossom", a composition by trumpeter Kenny Dorham on his 1960 album Quiet Kenny

== See also ==
- Lotus Flower (disambiguation)
- Blue lotus (disambiguation)
- White Lotus (disambiguation)
- Lotus (disambiguation)
