= Sacred lotus =

Sacred lotus may refer to:

- Nelumbo nucifera, also known as "Indian lotus"
  - Padma (attribute), Nelumbo nucifera in Indian religions
  - Lotus throne in Buddhist and Hindu art
- Nymphaea caerulea, the "blue lotus" in Ancient Egyptian religion
  - Utpala in Buddhist art
- Nymphaea lotus, the "white lotus" in Ancient Egyptian religion

== See also ==
- Lotus (disambiguation)
- Lotus Flower (disambiguation)
- Blue lotus (disambiguation)
- White lotus (disambiguation)
