= Utpala (disambiguation) =

Utpala is Sanskrit for nymphaea nouchali, the blue lotus, significant in Indian religions and art. It may also refer to:

- Utpala (astronomer), 10th-century mathematician-astronomer from India
- Utpala (Paramara king), a 10th-century king of Malwa region in India
- Utpaladeva, 10th century Shaivite philosopher-theologian from Kashmir
- Utpala dynasty of Kashmir, India; ruled between 8th to 11th centuries
- Naraka (Buddhism), the concept of hell in Buddhism
- Utpala Sen, Indian actor

== See also ==
- Utpal, an Indian male given name
- Blue lotus (disambiguation)
