= Gazzotti =

Gazzotti is a surname. Notable people with the surname include:

- Andrés Gazzotti (1896–1984), Argentine polo player
- Bruno Gazzotti (born 1970), Belgian comic artist
- Giulio Gazzotti (born 1991), Italian basketballer
- Lotus de Païni (1862–1953), born as Elvezia Giulia Maria Gazzotti, Italian painter, writer, sculptor, and occultist
- Marko Gazzotti (born 2004), French rugby union player

== See also ==
- Villa Gazzotti Grimani, villa in Veneto, Italy
