= Copparo =

- Comune
- Comune di Copparo
- Piazza del Popolo

- Flag Coat of arms

- Location within Italy Location within Emilia-Romagna
- Coordinates: 44°54′N 11°50′E
- Country: Italy
- Region: Emilia-Romagna
- Province: Ferrara (FE)
- Frazioni: Ambrogio, Brazzolo, Coccanile-Cesta, Fossalta, Gradizza, Sabbioncello San Pietro, Sabbioncello San Vittore, Saletta - Cà Matte, Sant'Apollinare, Tamara, Ponte San Pietro

Government
  - Mayor: Fabrizio Pagnoni

Area
  - Total: 157 km^{2} (61 sq mi)
- Elevation: 7 m (23 ft)

Population (1 January 2019)
  - Total: 16,234
  - Density: 103/km^{2} (268/sq mi)
- Demonym: Copparesi
- Time zone: UTC+1 (CET)
  - Summer (DST): UTC+2 (CEST)
- Postal code: 44034
- Dialing code: 0532
- Patron saint: St. Peter and St. Paul
- Saint day: 29 June
- Website: Official website

Copparo (Ferrarese: Cupar, IPA: [kuˈpaːr]) is a town and comune of Emilia Romagna, Italy, in the Province of Ferrara, located 50 kilometres (31 mi) northeast of the regional capital of Bologna and 17 kilometres (11 mi) east of the provincial capital of Ferrara, Copparo sits in the fertile Po River Delta—10 kilometres (6 mi) south of the river and 35 kilometres (22 mi) from the Adriatic coast. The territory of the municipality lies between 0 and 7 metres (0 and 23 ft) above sea level.

== Demographics ==
Copparo has a population of about 17,000 inhabitants (Copparesi) and a surface of 157 square kilometres (61 mi^{2}); thus the population density is 111.2 inhabitants per square kilometer.

== History ==
The origins of Copparo date back to the early Middle Ages and are confirmed both by a formation prior to the year 1000 and by its belonging to the Church of Ferrara and Ravenna (955) under the name "Massa in Copario". From many historical documents it appears that Copparo was a rather large agricultural center within the territory of Ferrara. The 1431 census mentions it as the largest area sown with barley and wheat. Copparo was likewise mentioned in the Statuta Ferrariae dated 1287 under the name of "Coparius" (recalling the responsibility the citizens of Copparo had in digging the"de preta" channel). After the year 1251, the area fell under the title of the Dukes of Ferrara, the Estensi family. They used the area primarily for recreational purposes, developing one of their principle game preserves and hunting lodges, a turreted castle. It was destroyed during the war against Venice and rebuilt in 1540. It then became one of the most famous Estense Delights. Of the original structure and its five towers only a solitary one remains today, on the site of the current city hall.

== Cuisine ==
Copparo's cuisine includes dishes influenced by Estense and regional tradition. It features main courses such as pasticcio di maccheroni, cappelletti, and lasagne made with egg pasta. Ferrara bread, known as "ciupèta," is available in the town, prepared using a traditional recipe protected under the European IGP designation, with a shape associated with male and female symbols.

== Famous companies ==
There are 313 industrial firms employing 3.947 people that are the 55,19% of the total of the workers. There are 384 service firms employing 1.044 people that are the 14,60% of the total of the workers. There are also 385 firms employing 1.515 people that are the 21,18% of the total of the workers. There are also 104 administrative offices employing 646 workers that are the 9,03% of the total of the workers.

The most important factory in the area is Berco Spa, a manufacturer of considerable size specialised in the production of tracked vehicle components, equipment for overhauling the undercarriages of earth moving machinery and manufacture of machine tools for the reconditioning of internal combustion engines. The Copparo plant, the headquarters, stands on a site of about 500,000 square metres (120 acres) and has about 2,200 employees.

== Notable people ==
- Daniele Barioni (1930–2022) opera singer
- Lotus de Païni (1862–1953) painter, writer, sculptor
- Livio Pavanelli (1881–1958) actor
- Varenne (1995-2026) Standardbred

== Climate ==
Climate data for Copparo (1991–2020)
Month	Jan	Feb	Mar	Apr	May	Jun	Jul	Aug	Sep	Oct	Nov	Dec	Year
Mean daily maximum °C (°F)	6.2 (43.2)	9.4 (48.9)	14.9 (58.8)	19.2 (66.6)	24.2 (75.6)	28.6 (83.5)	31.0 (87.8)	31.1 (88.0)	26.0 (78.8)	19.4 (66.9)	12.3 (54.1)	6.6 (43.9)	19.1 (66.3)
Daily mean °C (°F)	2.7 (36.9)	4.3 (39.7)	8.7 (47.7)	12.9 (55.2)	17.7 (63.9)	21.8 (71.2)	23.5 (74.3)	24.1 (75.4)	19.5 (67.1)	14.4 (57.9)	8.6 (47.5)	3.4 (38.1)	13.5 (56.2)
Mean daily minimum °C (°F)	−0.8 (30.6)	−0.8 (30.6)	2.6 (36.7)	6.7 (44.1)	11.2 (52.2)	14.9 (58.8)	16.8 (62.2)	17.0 (62.6)	13.1 (55.6)	9.3 (48.7)	5.0 (41.0)	0.3 (32.5)	7.9 (46.3)
Average precipitation mm (inches)	38.7 (1.52)	50.9 (2.00)	48.0 (1.89)	58.9 (2.32)	77.0 (3.03)	59.4 (2.34)	35.8 (1.41)	53.7 (2.11)	66.3 (2.61)	79.2 (3.12)	72.5 (2.85)	51.5 (2.03)	691.9 (27.23)
Source: Arpae Emilia-Romagna
