= Neelathamara =

Neelathamara or Neela Thamara (lit. 'Blue lotus') may refer to:

- Neelathamara (1979 film), an Indian Malayalam-language romance film
- Neelathamara (2009 film), an Indian Malayalam-language romantic drama film, a remake of the above

== See also ==
- Blue lotus (disambiguation)
