= Utpal =

Utpal is a given name. Notable people with the name include:

- Utpal Banerjee (born 1957), Professor of the Department of Molecular, Cell and Developmental Biology at UCLA
- Utpal K. Banerjee, Indian writer, adviser on management and information technology
- Utpal Kumar Basu (1939–2015), Bengali poet and story teller
- Utpal Bhadra, retired scientist, worked in the Centre for Cellular and Molecular Biology (CCMB) in Hyderabad, India
- Utpal Bhattacharya, finance professor at the Hong Kong University of Science and Technology
- Utpal Bhayani (1953–2019), Gujarati language story writer, playwright, critic and translator from Gujarat, India
- Utpal Borah, Bharatiya Janata Party politician from Assam
- Utpal Borpujari, double National Film Award winner; one, as a film critic, and the other, as a filmmaker
- Utpal Chatterjee (born 1964), former Indian cricketer
- Utpal Das (born 1986), Assamese film actor
- Utpal Datta, Assamese film critic from Guwahati
- Utpal Dutt (1929–1993), Indian actor, director, and writer-playwright
- Utpal V Nayanar (born 1959), Indian cinematographer and director from Kasaragod, Kerala
- Utpal S. Tatu (born 1964), Indian molecular biologist, biochemist and a professor in the Indian Institute of Science

== See also ==
- Utpal Shanghvi Global School (USGS), a private school in J.V.P.D Scheme area of Juhu, Mumbai, India
