= Neel Kamal =

Neel Kamal (lit. 'Blue Lotus' in Sanskrit) may refer to these Indian films:

- Neel Kamal (1947 film), a Hindi film directed by Kidar Sharma with debut roles by Raj Kapoor and Madhubala
- Neel Kamal (1968 film), a Hindi film directed by Ram Maheshwari starring Waheeda Rehman, Raaj Kumar and Manoj Kumar

== See also ==
- Blue lotus (disambiguation)
