= Lotos =

Lotos may refer to:

- Grupa Lotos, oil company
- Lotos Kolej, railway company
- LOTOS Goldbrillen GmbH, a German luxury eyewear company founded in 1872
- Lotos (satellite), a Russian family of electronic intelligence satellites
- Language Of Temporal Ordering Specification
- The Lotos-Eaters, a poem by Alfred Tennyson
- Lotos (Anton Yelizarov), a Russian military and mercenary leader, one of the commanders of PMC Wagner Group.

== See also ==
- Lotus (disambiguation)
