= Berco (company) =

- Berco S.p.A. logo
- Type: S.p.A.
- Industry: Heavy machinery
- Genre: OEM manufacturer of undercarriage systems and components
- Founded: 1918
- Founder: Vezio Bertoni
- Headquarters: Copparo (near Ferrara), Italy
- Area served: Europe, North America, South America, India
- Number of employees: approx. 1,300
- Parent: Thyssenkrupp
- Website: www.berco.com

Berco S.p.A. is an Italian manufacturer and supplier of undercarriages for heavy machinery. Founded in 1918, the company produces undercarriage solutions for earthmoving machinery weighing from 1 to 330 tons. Its main products are components for compact track loaders (CTL) and undercarriage parts for mining machines. The company also supplies the construction, forestry and agriculture industries. According to the company, one in five chain-driven construction vehicles is equipped with Berco systems.

For the aftermarket, the company provides drive sprockets, idlers, rollers, track chains, track shoes and undercarriage systems. Its ranges are available in three product lines: Platinum, Original and Service.

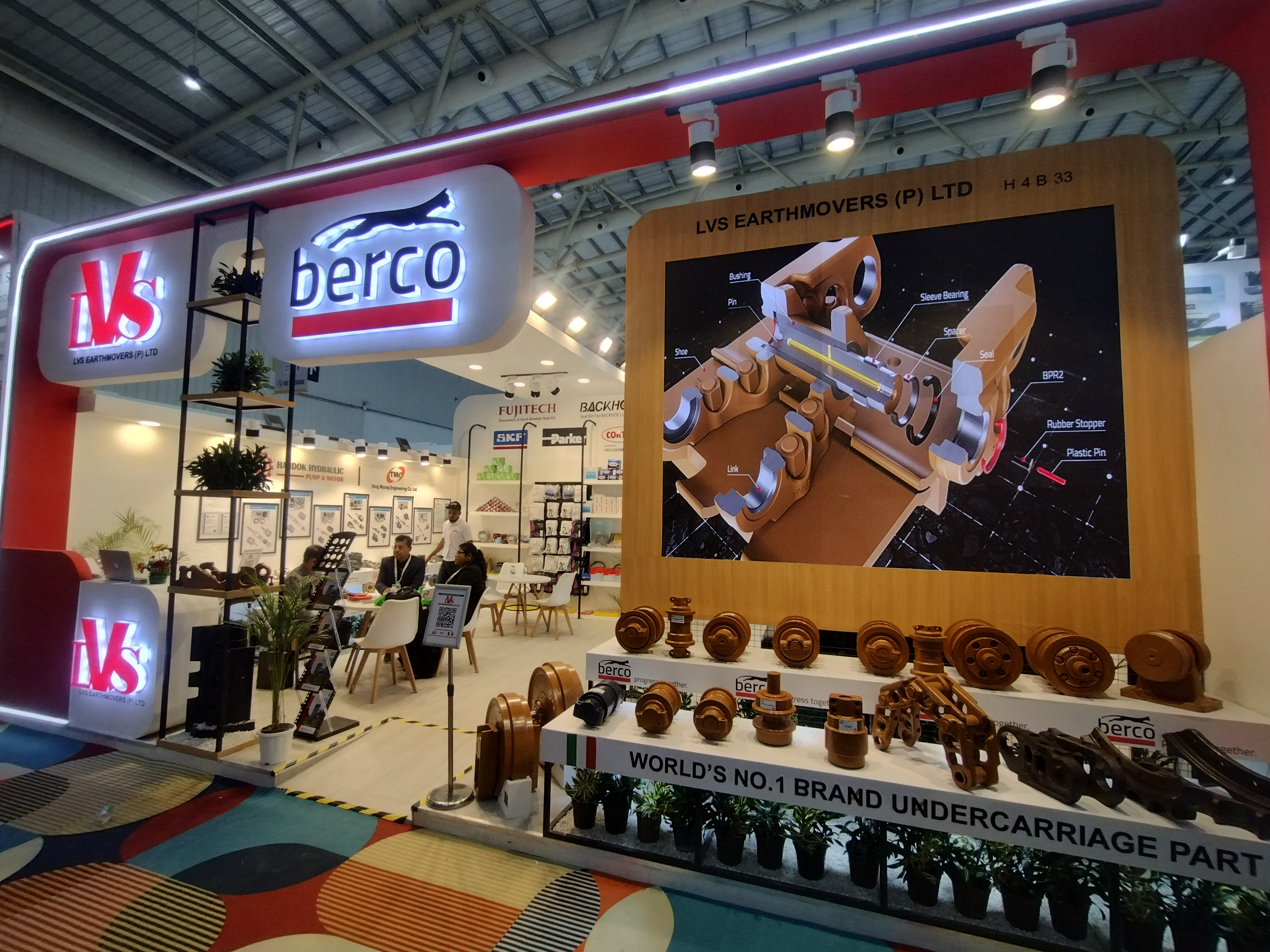
Berco India at EXCON 2025, BIEC

== History ==
Berco's main factory is in Copparo, Italy, with approximately 1,300 employees. The company also operates four other facilities in Italy, Brazil and the United States.

It was founded in 1918 by Vezio Bertoni, who opened a bicycle repair shop, continuing his father's work. He soon began repairing agricultural machinery and vehicles abandoned by the US Army in the countryside of Ferrara. The small business grew into a workshop of 30 employees and began producing machine tools and spare parts for tractors. When the entrepreneur Roberto Cotti joined Bertoni, the company became "Bertoni & Cotti", the origin of the name Berco.

== Thyssenkrupp ==
Berco has been part of the Thyssenkrupp group since 1999. In October 2017, it joined thyssenkrupp's Forged Technologies business unit. According to the company, it is one of the world's largest forging companies.

== R&D department ==
In November 2021, Berco presented its new R&D facility at its 500,000 m^{2} (5,400,000 sq ft) site in Copparo. With the official opening, Berco completed an investment of €1 million. The new department covers 2,000 m^{2} (22,000 sq ft) and houses new manufacturing tools, a laboratory, 3D printing technology and presses.

The R&D team employs 23 researchers in two subgroups, a metallurgical laboratory and product engineering, and is set to be expanded.

== Sustainability ==
Berco has stated that it aims to reduce the environmental impact of its production. Renovations over a three-year roadmap are intended to reduce CO_{2} emissions by 2,500 tons per year and annual gas consumption by 13%. Various energy-efficiency activities are estimated to reduce annual electricity consumption by about three million kWh once the project is completed.

== See also ==
- List of Italian companies
