= Hilda Clarke =

American politician (1896–1981)

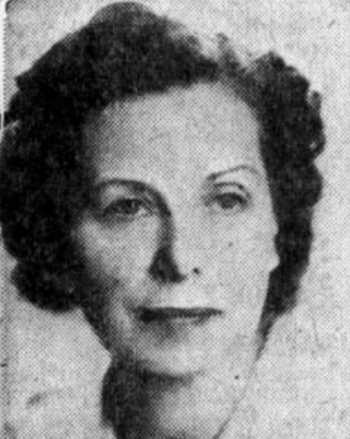

Member of the Connecticut House of Representatives from Stamford
- In office 1955–1959 Serving with Webster C. Givens
- Preceded by: Madelyn R. Weir; Daniel Miller
- Succeeded by: Lotus Mills; James N. Mulreed

Member of the Connecticut House of Representatives from the 158th district
- In office 1967–1973
- Preceded by: Seat established
- Succeeded by: Seat eliminated

Personal details
- Born: May 5, 1896 Norwalk, Connecticut, U.S.
- Died: May 18, 1981 (aged 85) Stamford, Connecticut, U.S.
- Party: Republican
- Spouse: Josiah Stuart Clarke (died 1969)
- Children: 2

Hilda S. Clarke (May 5, 1896 – May 18, 1981) was an American politician who served in the Connecticut House of Representatives. A Republican, she represented the city of Stamford from 1955 to 1959, and the 158th district from 1967 to 1973.

== Personal life ==
Clarke was born in Norwalk, Connecticut, on May 5, 1896. She was a resident of the Springdale neighborhood of Stamford for 53 years and was married to Josiah Stuart Clarke until his death in 1969. Together, they had two children, Stuart and Doris. Stuart Clarke would later work extensively in federal government, including as a regional administrator at the United States Department of Health, Education, and Welfare, appointed by Caspar Weinberger in 1974.

== Political career ==
=== Connecticut House of Representatives ===
Clarke was first elected to the Connecticut House of Representatives in 1954, and she served two terms representing the city of Stamford alongside fellow Republican Webster C. Givens. Clarke unsuccessfully ran for reelection in 1958 and was succeeded by Lotus Mills and James N. Mulreed. In 1960, she again ran unsuccessfully.

In 1966, Clarke was elected to the newly established 158th district, where she served three terms. In 1972, Connecticut redistricted the House of Representatives, and the 158th district was eliminated, making Clarke the sole person to have represented it. Clarke did not run for election to a new House district, instead running for the 27th district of the Connecticut State Senate. She was defeated by Democratic candidate William E. Strada Jr., and she left office in 1973.

==== Tenure and political positions ====
Throughout her tenure in the House, Clarke expressed concern about air pollution in Connecticut and the laxity of legislation intended to curb it. In the 1967 session, she was part of the General Assembly's Public Health and Safety Committee, which passed what she called a "watered-down version of a Clean Air Act". Clarke stated that the bill was inadequate, but that she voted for it because "it was better than no Bill at all." In 1970, following a strengthening of the penalties defined in the original bill, Clarke remarked that "the penalties for not obeying the law were so minimal that it was easier for larger companies to continue to pay fines than comply," and that "today residents are restricted from burning leaves or papers in their backyards, but the big offenders are more difficult to control."

In 1968, Clarke expressed support for repealing taxes on retail and wholesale businesses, citing concern that "we may be ruling ourselves out as a regional warehouse for national corporations, thus keeping out new business."

In 1972, while campaigning for the Connecticut Senate, Clarke stated that she believed abortion should be "a private matter between a woman and her doctor", and that she considered Connecticut's law, which then allowed abortion only when the life of the mother was endangered and did not include exceptions for rape and incest, to be an "anti-abortion law".

== Death ==
Clarke died on May 18, 1981, at her home in Springdale. She was 85.
