= Lateral olfactory tract usher substance =

Membrane protein produced by neurons

Lateral olfactory tract usher substance (LOTUS), also known as Cartilage acidic protein-1B (Crtac1B), is a membrane protein produced by neurons. During embryonic development, it is strongly expressed in the olfactory bulb by Mitral cells.

== Function ==
LOTUS is an endogenous antagonist of the Nogo receptor (NgR1) and Paired Immunoglobulin-Like Receptor B (PirB in mice, LilrB2 in humans). These receptors block neuronal outgrowth when activated. By blocking their function, LOTUS promotes neuronal growth, e.g. during the formation of the lateral olfactory tract. As LOTUS generates a permissive brain environment for neuronal regeneration, it may aid recovery after spinal cord injury. It also has been shown to reduce synapse loss in a mouse model of Alzheimer's disease.
