= Bingdi lotus =

Species of flowering plant

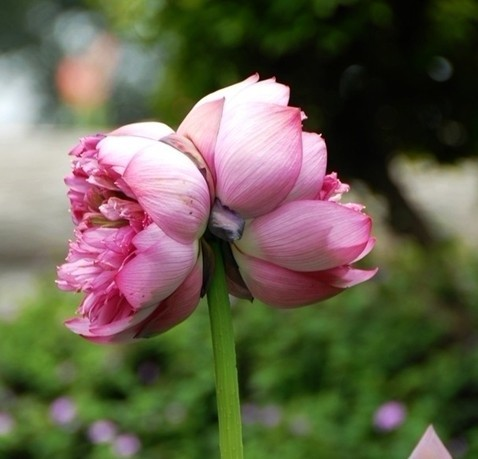
Bingdi lotus

Bingdi lotus (Chinese: 并蒂莲; pinyin: bìngdì lián), or Bingtou lotus (Chinese: 并头莲; pinyin: bìngtóu lián), is a species of lotus native to China that carries a pair of flowers on each flower stalk, whereas there is only a single flower on most other species of lotus. Bingdi lotus belongs to a special type named Qianban lotus (Chinese: 千瓣莲; pinyin: qiānbàn lián) and is a treasure among flowers because it has all the essential parts of both the leaves and lotus.
In Chinese tradition, Bingdi lotuses are considered both auspicious and joyous and as an embodiment of kindness and beauty.

== Growth ==
Generally speaking, a lotus forms only one flower bud, one meristem centre and blossoms into one flower. But if affected by some special outside surroundings or inside variations, the flower bud may be divided into two meristem centres and then grow into two buds like the twins. Afterwards, two flower stalks will appear on the same stalk, and then they both come into blossom and finally bear fruit-pod.

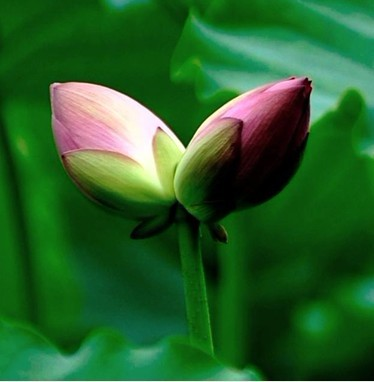

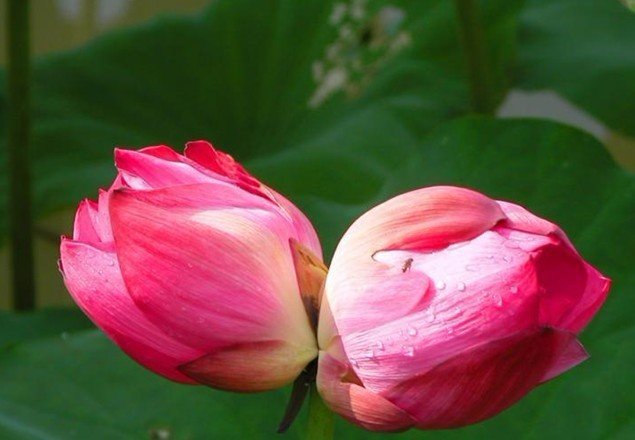

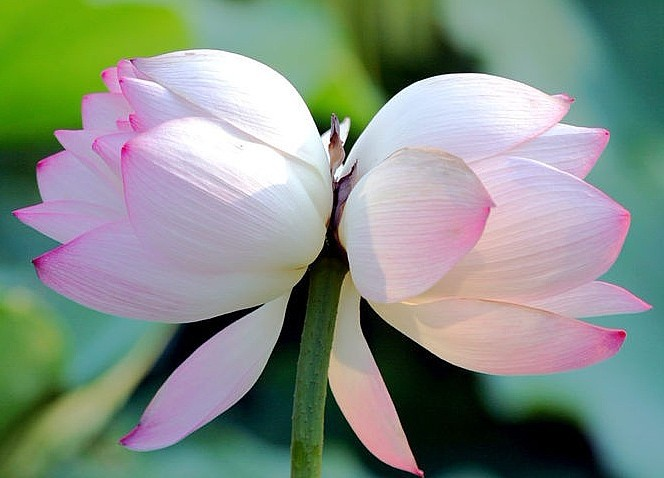

== Value ==
Bingdi lotuses are considered as twins compared to other plants and it appears at a low rate. So it’s a treasure among lotuses. The genetic mechanism of bingdi lotuses is still under study and cannot be copied for the time being. Experts once did some experiments on bingdi lotuses and it turned out that bingdi lotuses are completely natural and not acquirable by inheritance.

== Symbolism ==
Bingdi lotuses are called “gentleman among the flowers” and represents permanent and single-minded love.

In classical literature, Bingdi lotuses stand for love and imply the couple who are dear to each other and live a harmonious life. What’s more, Bingdi lotuses symbolize the lingering love between lovers and the brotherhood of man.

The folktale regards the appearance of Bingdi lotuses as something lucky.
