= Operation Lotus =

Operation Lotus may refer to:

- Indonesian invasion of East Timor (1975–1976), a conflict fought between the Indonesian New Order and East Timor.
- Operation Lotus (BJP) (2008–present), a term coined in India to describe a political strategy allegedly used by the Bharatiya Janata Party to secure support from legislators of opposition parties.
- Operation Lotus (2011), the Canadian relief operation in response to record flooding in the Richelieu River valley.
