= Utpal Bhadra =

Indian scientist

Utpal Bhadra a retired scientist, worked in the Centre for Cellular and Molecular Biology (CCMB) in Hyderabad, India. Bhadra is known for his work on RNA interference, and is a Fellow of the Royal Society of Biology and a Fellow of the Royal Society of Chemistry in the United Kingdom.

Bhadra, along with his wife, Manika Pal Bhadra, and Jim Birchler of the University of Missouri, proved in 1997 that gene silencing occurs in animal systems. His work published in the journal Science was in the top ten ranking for papers for three consecutive years.

== Education and research career ==
=== Early life and education ===
Bhadra was born and raised in a small village in the periphery of Sunderbans, West Bengal, India. His father Late Kalipada Bhadra was an Assistant Head Master of the village school. Bhadra completed his primary education from the village High School in Hingalganj. Due to absence of a scope for further education in his village, he completed his schooling until class twelve from his sister's place in Asansol. He pursued his bachelor's degree from the Presidency College in Zoology, Chemistry and Botany which he completed in 1980.

== Retracted 2018 paper ==
In 2018, Bhadra and Manika Pal Bhadra were among seven authors of a paper in PLOS One on the regulation of BMI1 expression by microRNAs in breast cancer cells.

The journal retracted the paper on 21 January 2026. The journal reported serious data malpractice and research misconduct such as overlaps between several image panels in Figures 4 and 5 and noted that an actin panel in Figure 6 appeared similar to one in Figure 7 despite representing different experimental conditions. The editors also questioned the statistical approach reported in the methods section. The first author said the figure problems resulted from errors in figure preparation and disagreed with the statistical concerns, but stated that the underlying data were no longer available. Unable to resolve the concerns without the individual-level and image data, the editors retracted the article. The first author agreed with the retraction; the remaining six authors, including Bhadra and Pal Bhadra, either did not respond or could not be reached.
