= Lotus Mills =

American politician (died 1975)

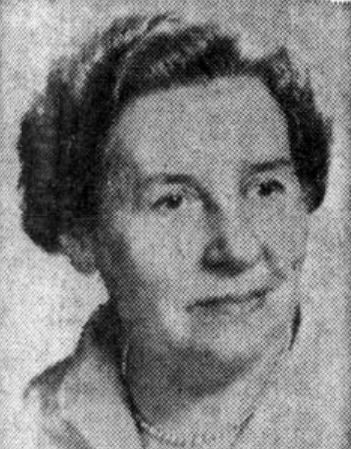

Member of the Connecticut House of Representatives from Stamford
- In office 1959–1961 Serving with James N. Mulreed
- Preceded by: Hilda Clarke; Webster C. Givens
- Succeeded by: James N. Mulreed; Martin F. Armstrong Jr.

Personal details
- Born: Lotus Lucile Mitchell; 1896 or 1897 Shenandoah, Iowa, U.S.
- Died: January 31, 1975 (aged 78) Stamford, Connecticut, U.S.
- Party: Democratic
- Spouse: William E. Mills Jr.
- Education: Columbia University

Lotus Lucile Mills (née Mitchell; 1896 or 1897 – January 31, 1975) was an American politician who served in the Connecticut House of Representatives from 1959 to 1961, representing the city of Stamford as a Democrat.

== Personal life and education ==
Mills was born in Shenandoah, Iowa, to parents Oliver T. and Harriet Stephenson Mitchell. She graduated from Columbia University in New York City and subsequently worked as a law librarian for Sullivan & Cromwell, a multinational law firm. Mills later moved to Stamford, Connecticut, where she would live for 35 years. She was married to William E. Mills Jr. She was a Christian Scientist.

Mills died on January 31, 1975, in Stamford. She was 78.

== Political career ==
Mills first ran for election to the Connecticut House of Representatives in 1956, but was defeated by Webster C. Givens and Hilda Clarke. In 1958, she ran again and was elected to serve as one of two representatives from the city of Stamford. She served her term alongside James N. Mulreed and unsuccessfully ran for reelection in 1960. Mulreed and Martin F. Armstrong succeeded her.

Mills' 1958 campaign was endorsed by Governor Abe Ribicoff.

From 1960 to 1970, Mills served on the Stamford Park Commission. She also served as a director of the state board of the League of Women Voters.
