= List of plants known as lotus =

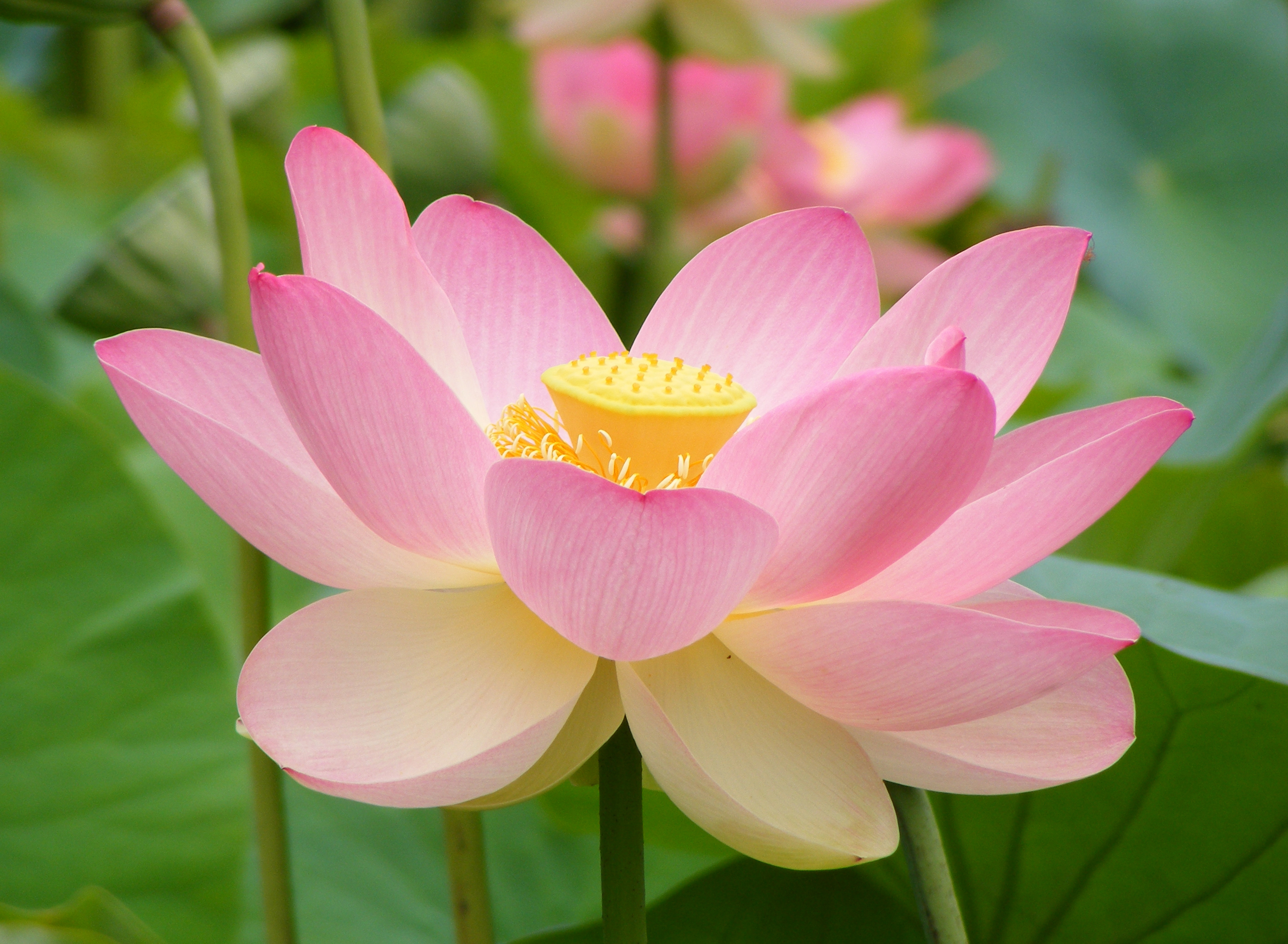
flower of Nelumbo nucifera at Botanic Garden, Adelaide, South Australia.

Lotus identifies various plant taxa:

- Nelumbo, a genus of aquatic plants with showy flowers known as lotuses, having two extant species:
  - Nelumbo nucifera, the Sacred or Indian lotus
  - Nelumbo lutea, the American or yellow lotus
- Certain species of Nymphaea, a genus of aquatic plants known as water lilies, are also known as Egyptian lotus or Egyptian water lily:
  - Nymphaea caerulea, also known as blue lotus
  - Nymphaea lotus, white lotus or sacred lotus
  - Nymphaea nouchali, also known as blue or star lotus (sometimes thought to be the same species as Nymphaea caerulea above)
- Lotus, a terrestrial genus of legumes with small flowers, including bird's-foot trefoils and deervetches
- Certain species of Saussurea, a genus of herbaceous plant, are known as snow lotus, particularly those from the Himalayan vicinity
- Ziziphus lotus, a shrub species with edible fruit
- Diospyros lotus, a tree with edible fruit known as the date-plum or Caucasian persimmon

== See also ==
- Lotus (disambiguation)
- Lotus tree, the mythological incarnation of Lotis
- Sacred lotus
