= Lotus throne =

Stylized lotus flower used as the seat or base for a figure in Asian art

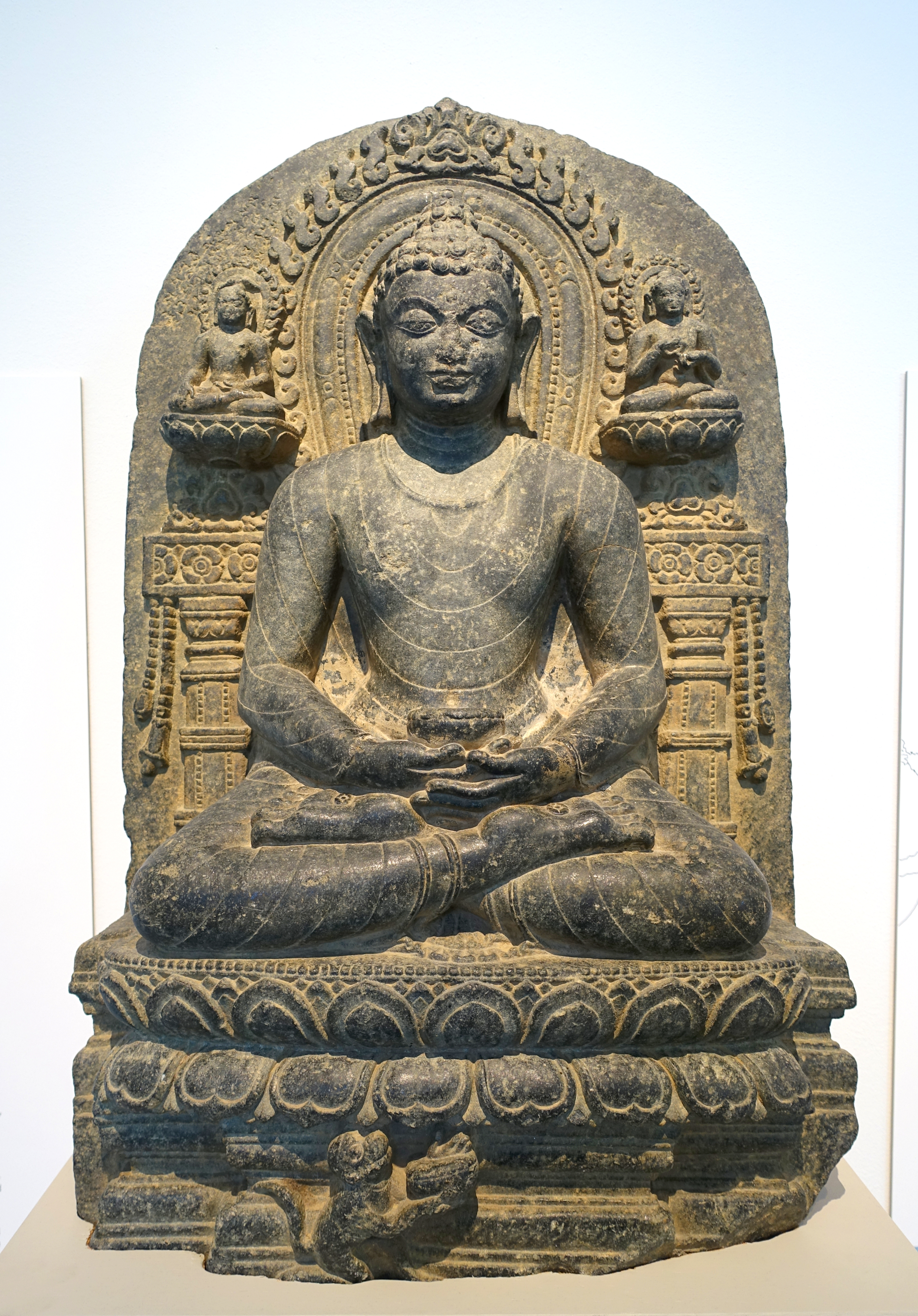
The three Buddha figures here each have a lotus throne. Pala dynasty, Eastern India, c. 1000.

The lotus throne, sometimes called lotus platform, is a stylized lotus flower used as the seat or base for a figure in art associated with Indian religions. It is the normal pedestal for divine figures in Buddhist art and Hindu art, and often seen in Jain art. Originating in Indian art, it followed Indian religions to East Asia in particular.

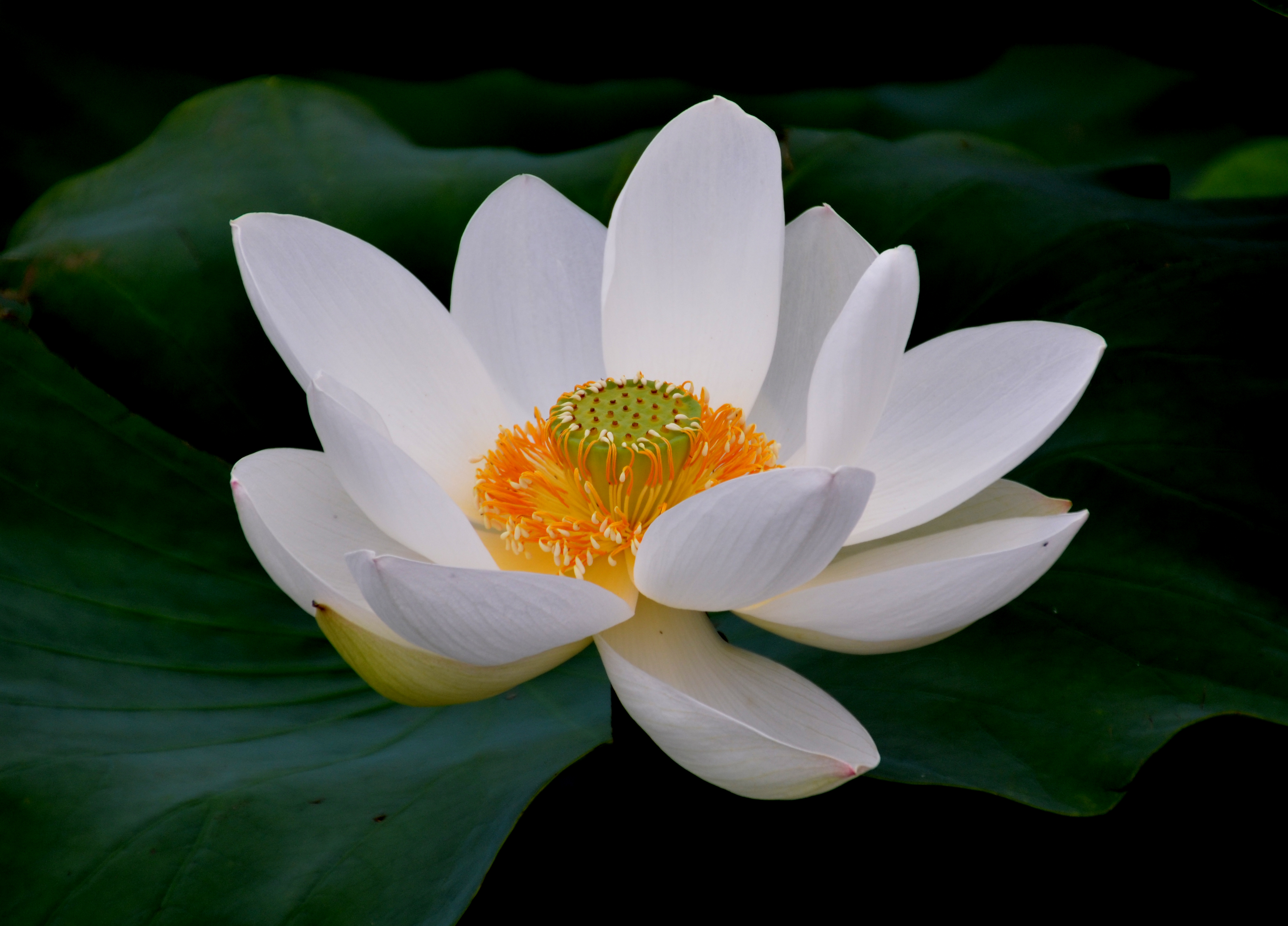
Flower of Nelumbo nucifera, the Indian lotus; its colour range is from white to red

The precise form varies, but is intended to represent the opening flower of Nelumbo nucifera, the Indian lotus. In the traditional biographies lotus flowers sprung up at the Buddha's first seven steps, and in some Buddhist legends the baby Padmasambhava emerged from a lotus flower. The Indian lotus is an aquatic plant similar to a water lily, though not actually any close relation. It has a large, round, and flat seed head in the centre of the flower, with initially small openings above each of the relatively small number of seeds. Among other unusual characteristics, Nelumbo nucifera has particular properties of repelling water, known as the lotus effect or ultrahydrophobicity. Among other symbolic meanings, it rises above the water environment it lives in, and is not contaminated by it, so providing a model for Buddhists. According to the Pali Canon, the Buddha himself began this often-repeated metaphor, in the Aṅguttara Nikāya, saying that the lotus flower raises from the muddy water unstained, as he raises from this world, free from the defilements taught in the sutra.

In Sanskrit the throne is called either a padmāsana (Sanskrit: पद्मासन, [pɐdmaːsɐnɐ], āsana is the name for a seated position), which is also the name for the Lotus position in meditation and yoga, or padmapitha, padma meaning lotus and pitha a base or plinth.

== History ==
The earliest of the Vedas, the Rigveda, describes the other gods watching the birth of Agni, the god of fire, seated on lotus flowers; also the birth of Vasishtha. In Hindu myth, the major deity Brahma emerged from a lotus growing from the navel of Vishnu.

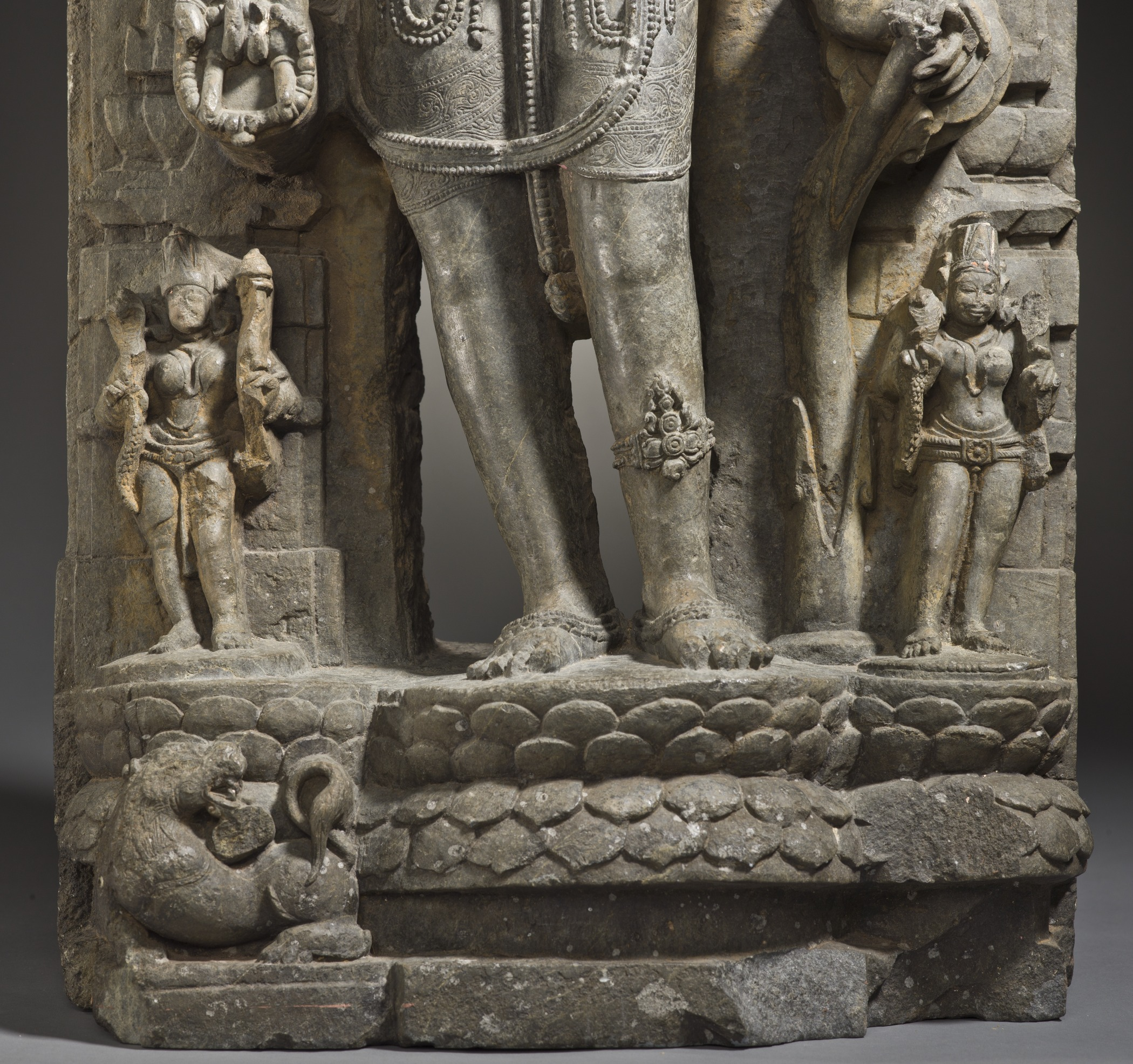
Double-thrones under Parvati, 11th century

In art the form is first seen as a base for rare early images of Lakshmi from the 2nd century BCE; many or most of these may have a Buddhist context. However it first becomes common with seated Buddha figures in the Greco-Buddhist art of Gandhara around the late 2nd or the 3rd century CE. It may have reached the Deccan as early as the end of the 2nd century. At some point, probably around 200, and before his death in about 250, the Buddhist thinker Nagarjuna exhorted an unknown Buddhist monarch, very probably in the Deccan, to:

... Please construct from all precious substances

Images of Buddha with fine proportions

Well designed and sitting on lotuses ...

– suggesting this iconography was current by then. It is not clear from the language whether sculptures or paintings, or both, were meant.

In early Buddhist art it may be intended to specifically depict the second of the Twin Miracles in the legend of the Buddha's life. In some accounts of this, when engaged in a contest with sorcerers, the Buddha multiplied himself into other bodies, which sat or stood on lotus flowers. It became used for other Buddhist figures, and adopted for other Hindu deities than Lakshmi.

== Form ==
The throne in art evolved to be rather distant from the actual plant. In historic sculpture there is very often a clear dividing line about halfway up; this type is called a "double-lotus" (vishvapadma) pedestal or throne. Most often petal shapes both rise and fall from the dividing line, but sometimes the upper part of the throne represents the prominent flat-topped seed head as a base for the figure, perhaps with circles for the holes holding the seeds, as in maturing lotus heads.

The bingdi lotus is a particular strain with two back-to-back flowers on each stem, but it is not clear if this influenced the form in art. In East Asian paintings, and also modern Hindu paintings, the lotus throne is often depicted more realistically in terms of its shape (not its size).

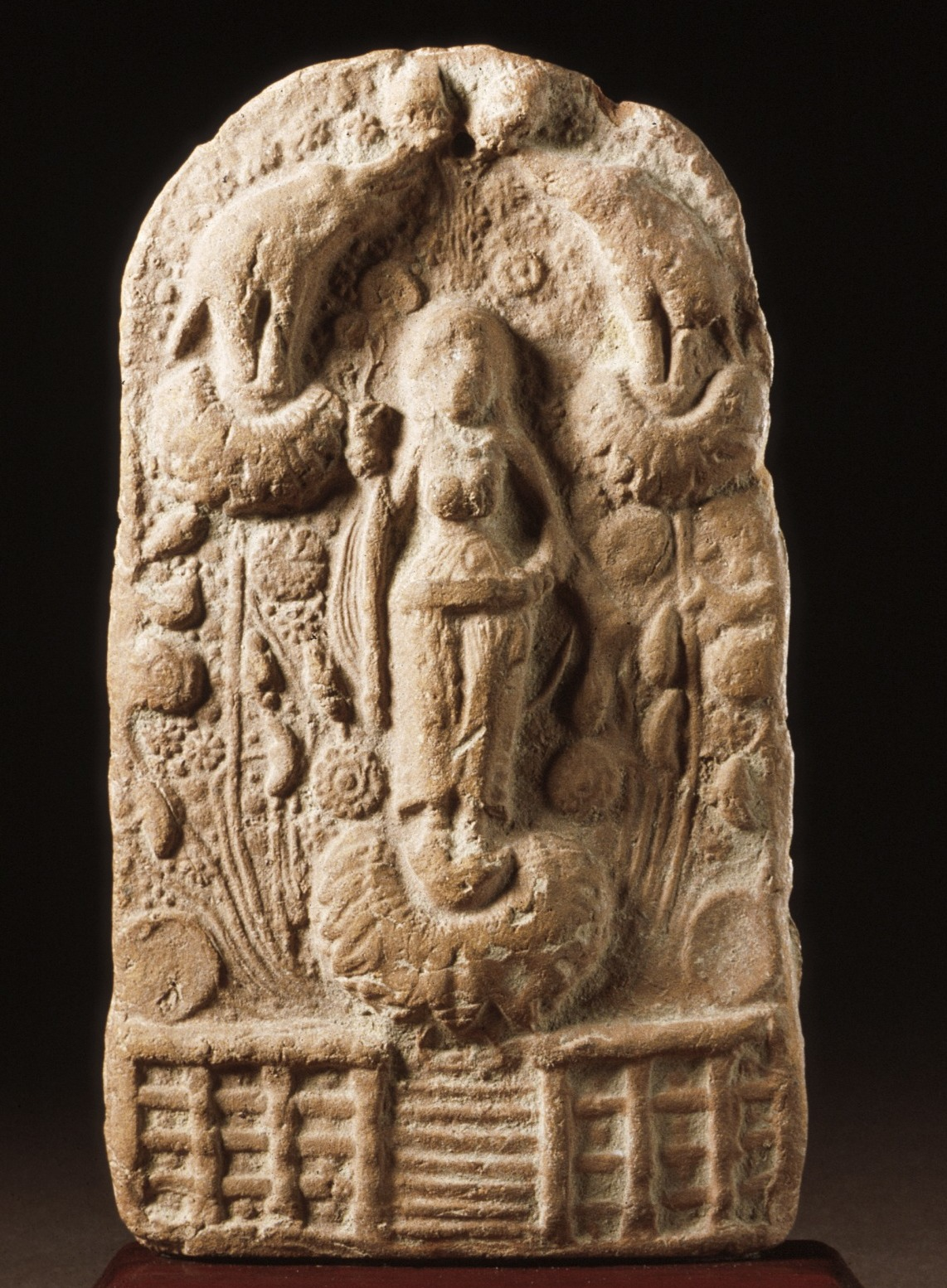
GajaLakshmi, 1st century BCE, terracotta, 14.61 cm tall.

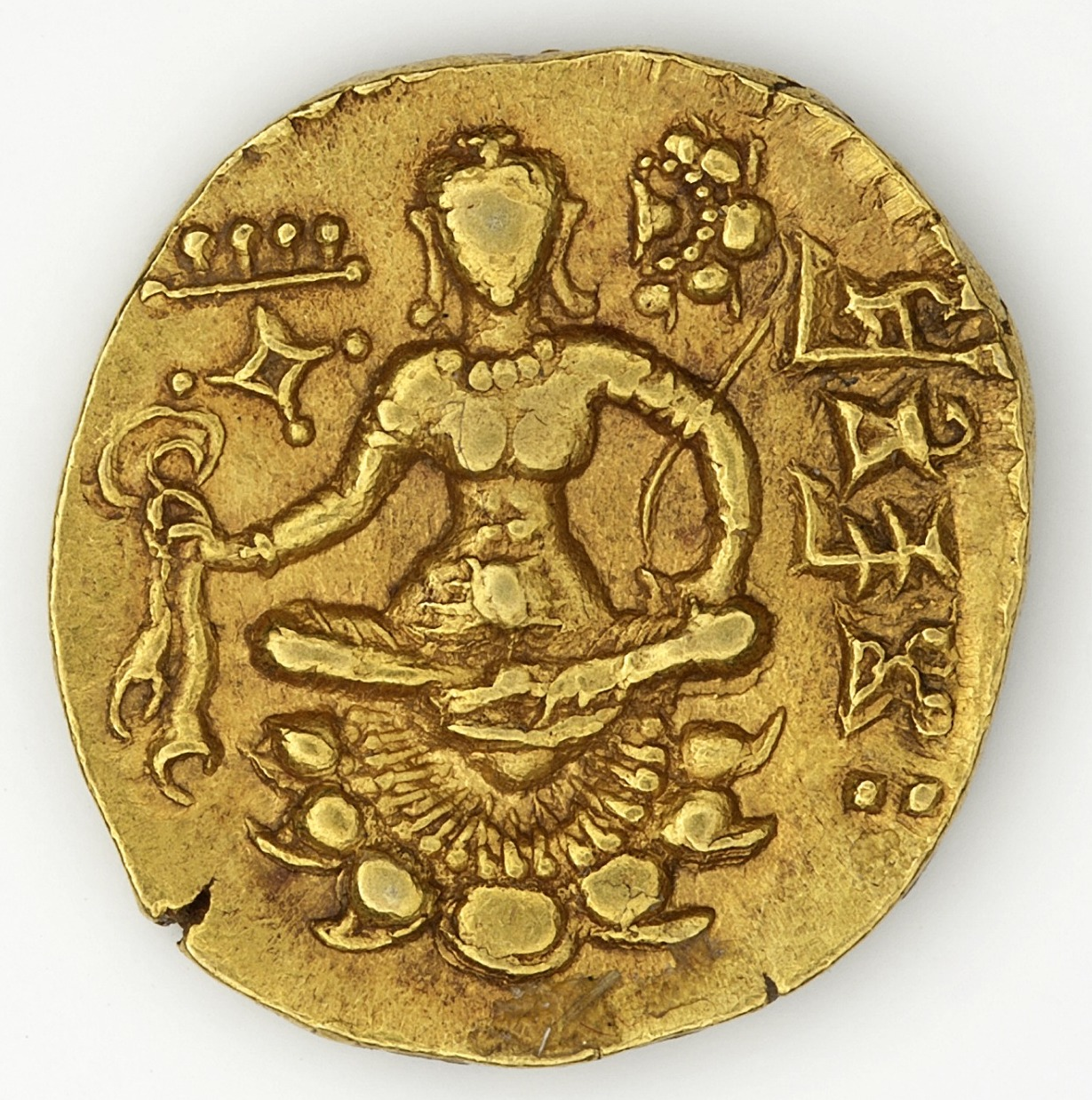
Gold dinar coin of Chandragupta II, reigned c. 375–c. 415 CE

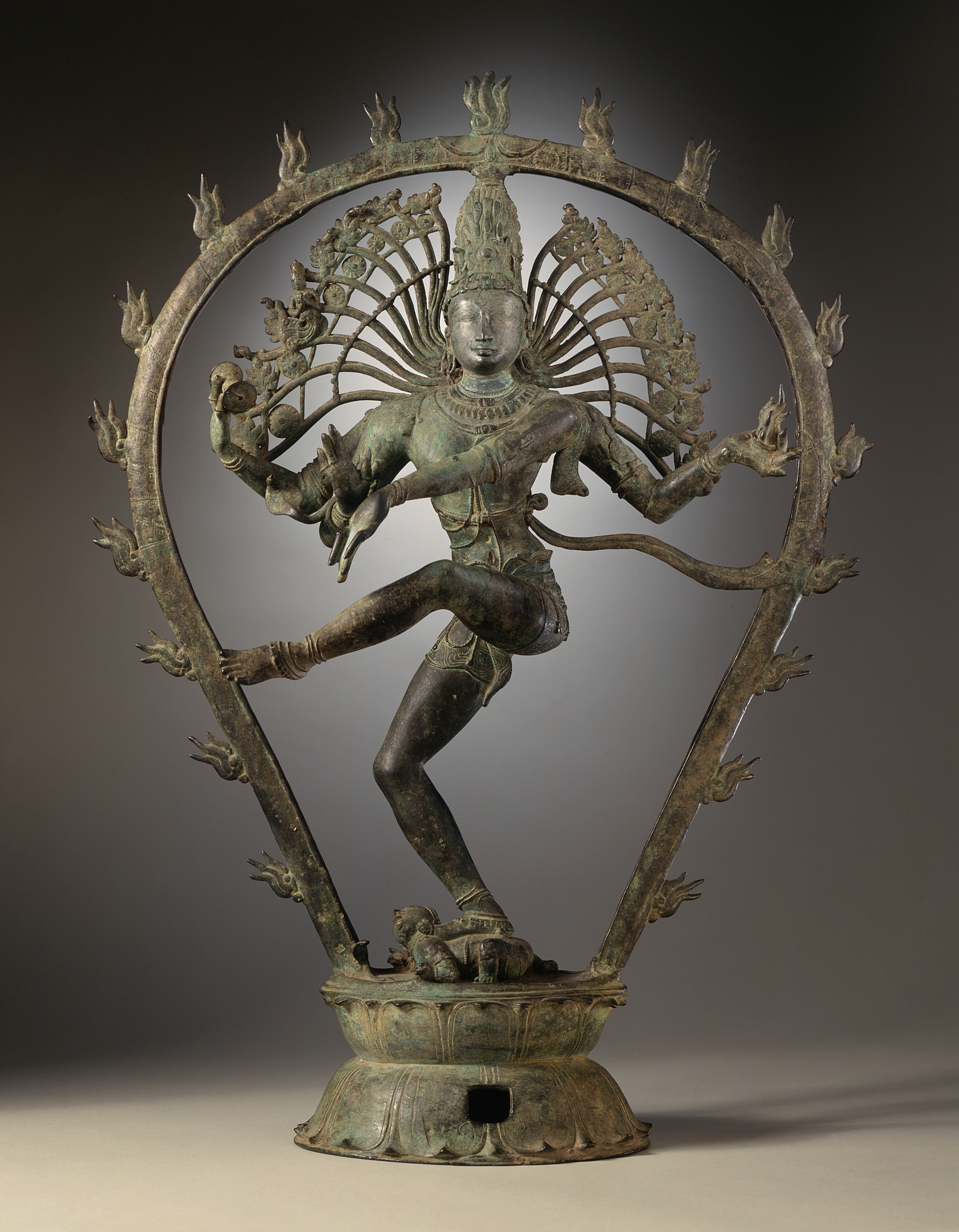
Restrained double-lotus throne typical of Chola bronzes, when they have them at all. Shiva Nataraja, 10th century.

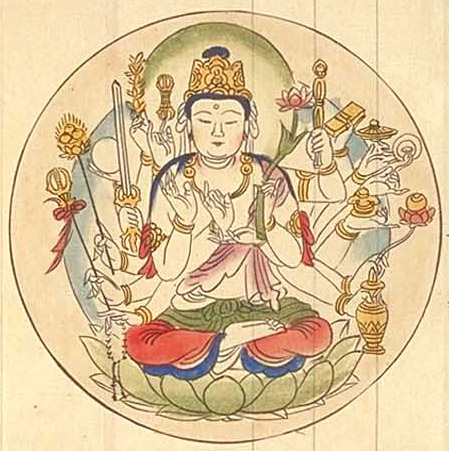
Guanyin, 12th-century Japan

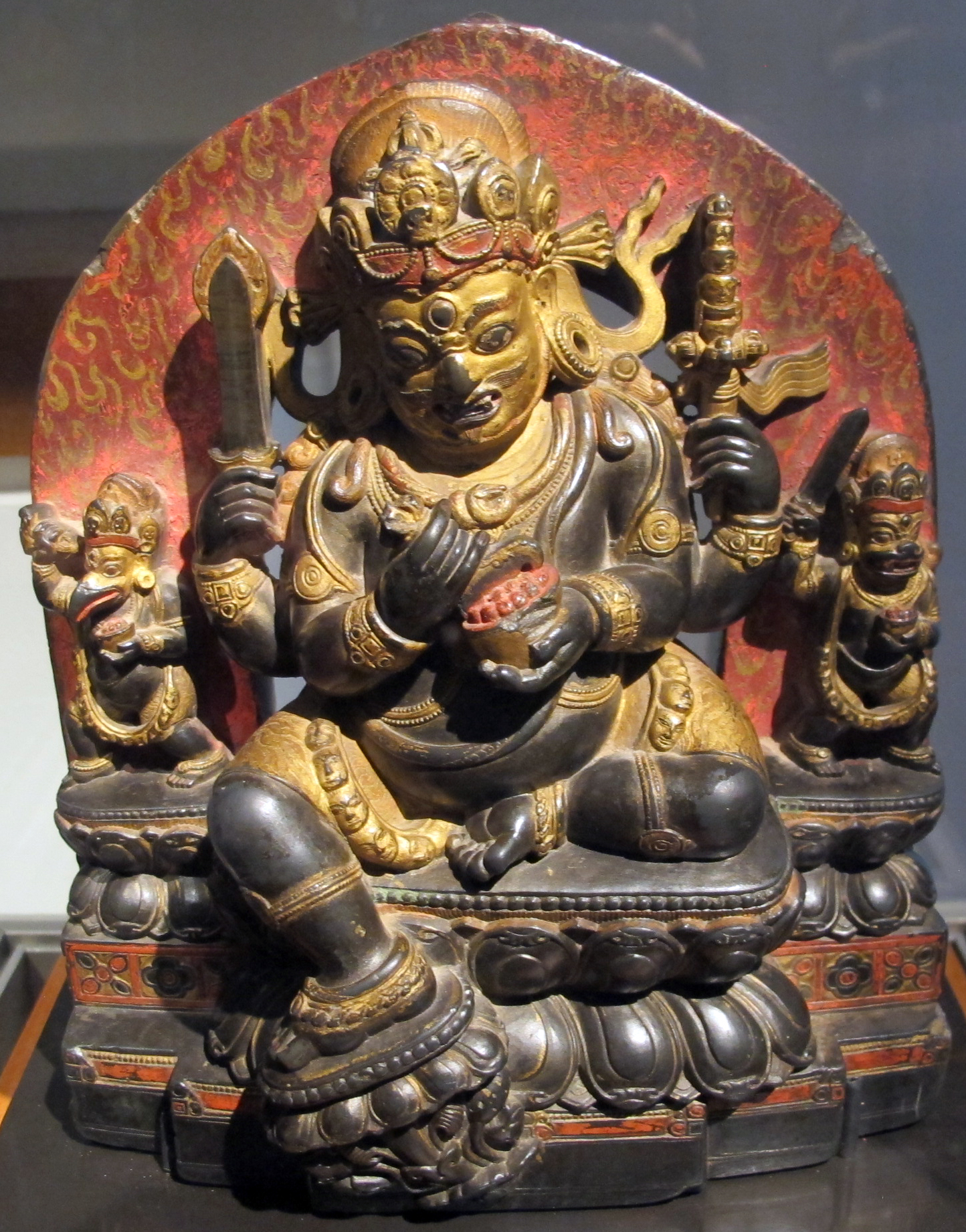
Apart from the three figures, the pendent foot of this 12th-century Tibetan Mahakala has its own throne

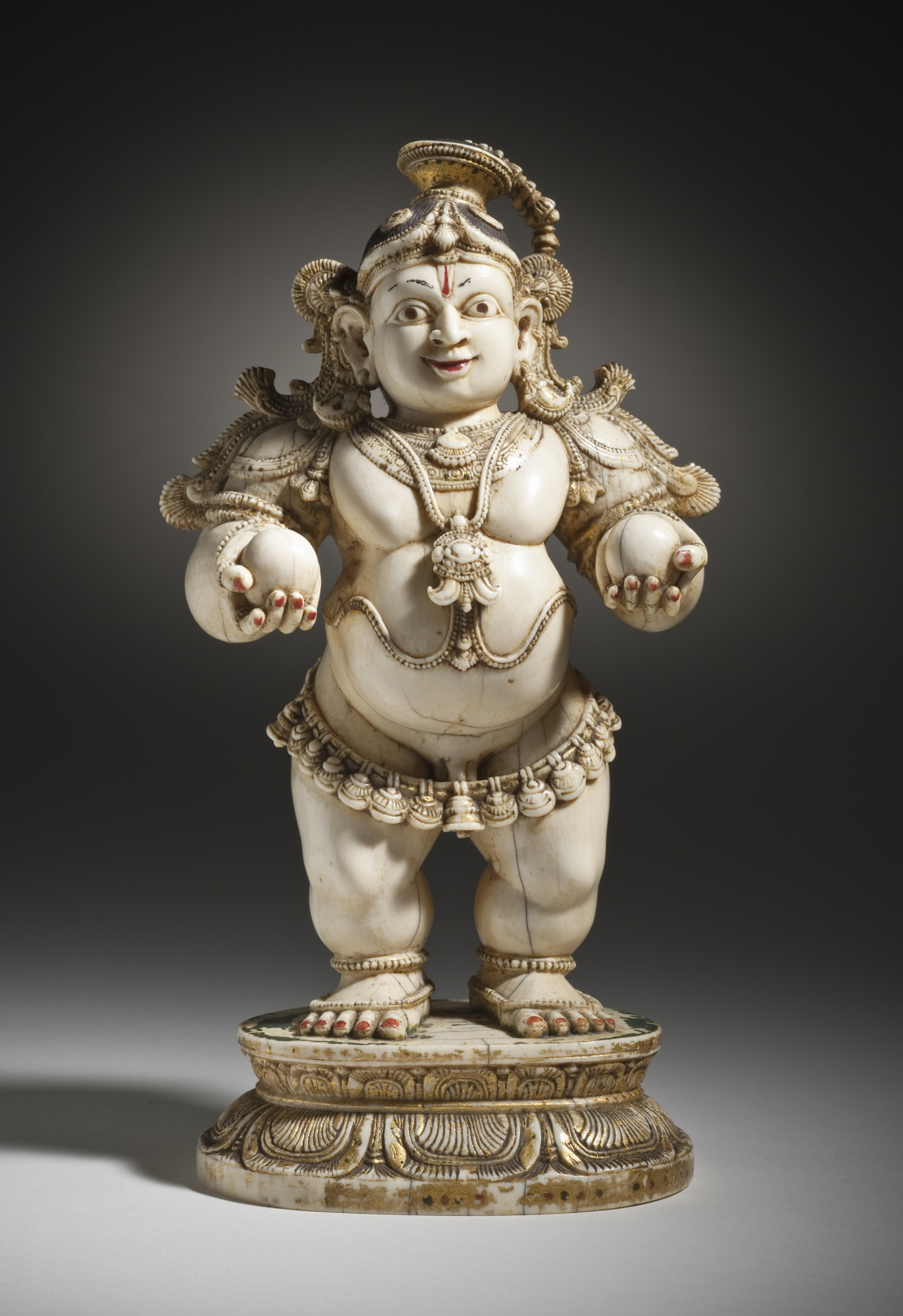
Krishna, the butter thief, ivory, 16th-century India

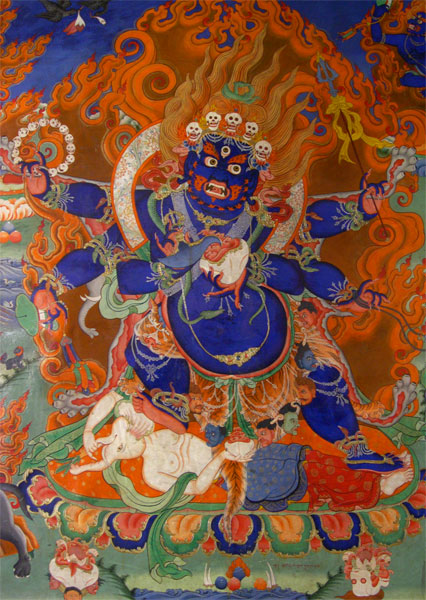
Fancy coloured Buddhist throne under Mahakala, Ladakh

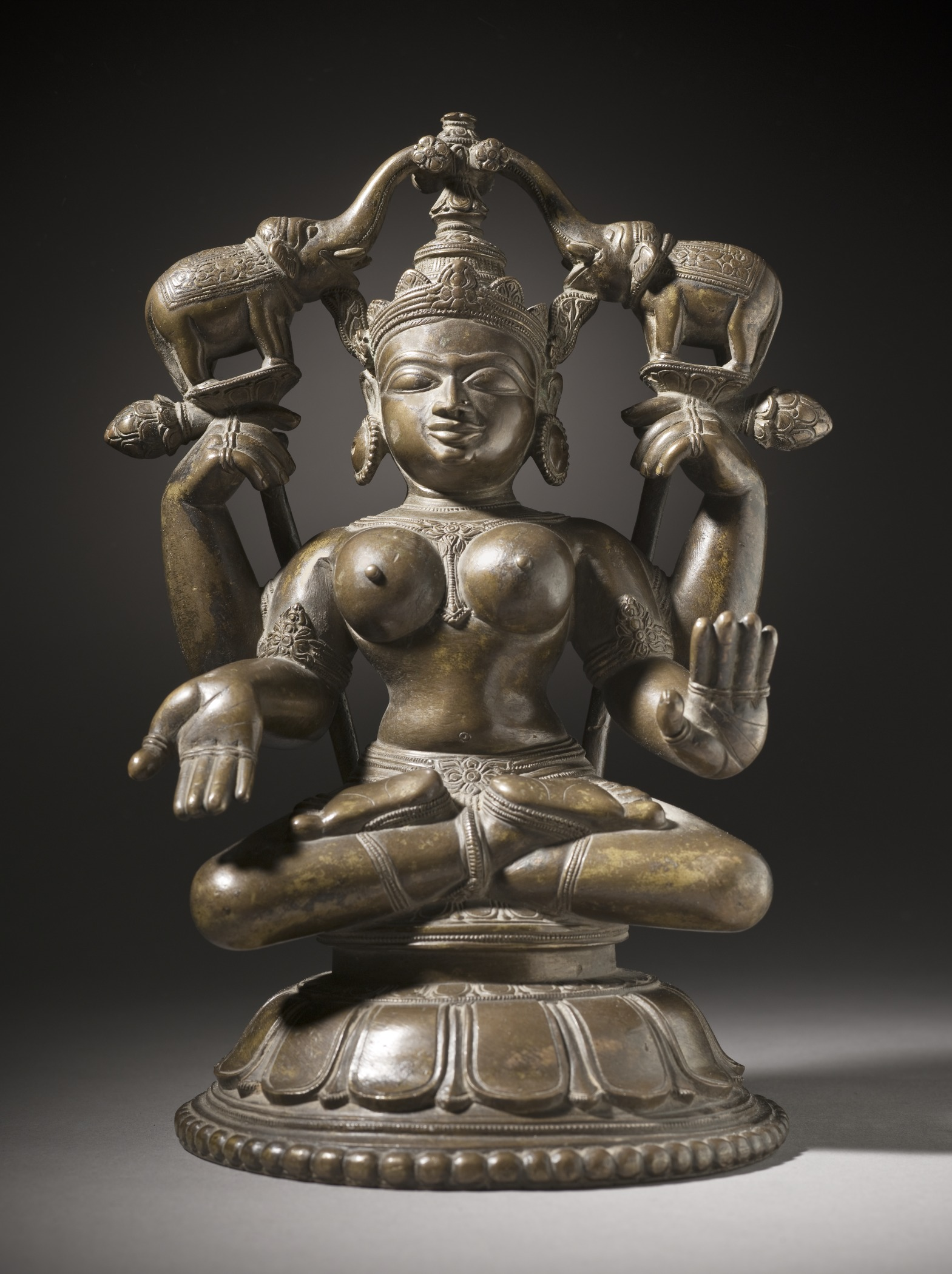
Single lotus throne under GajaLakshmi, with side stalks and buds, Odisha, 18th century

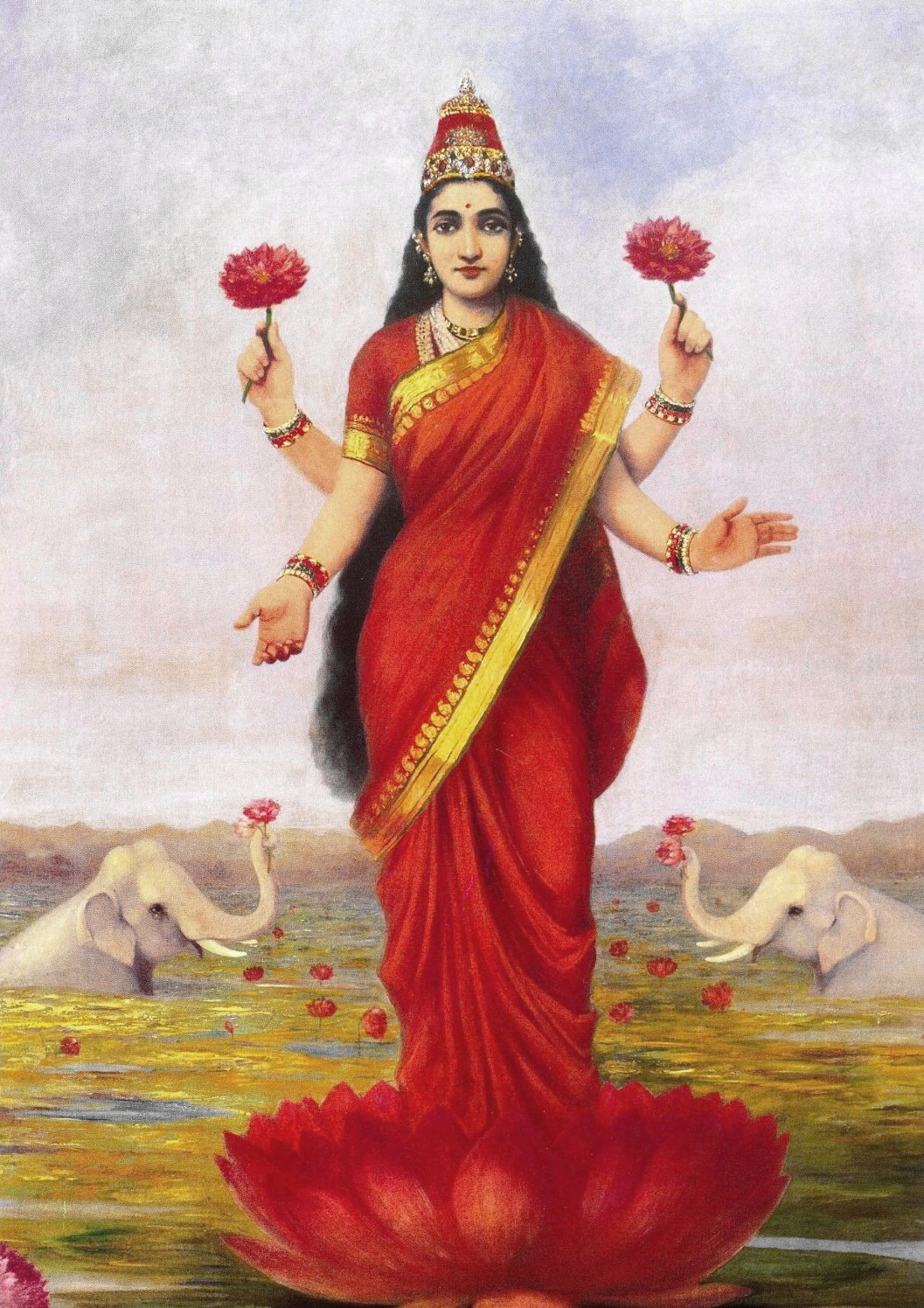
Raja Ravi Varma, Goddess Lakshmi, 1896

== Representing the whole plant ==
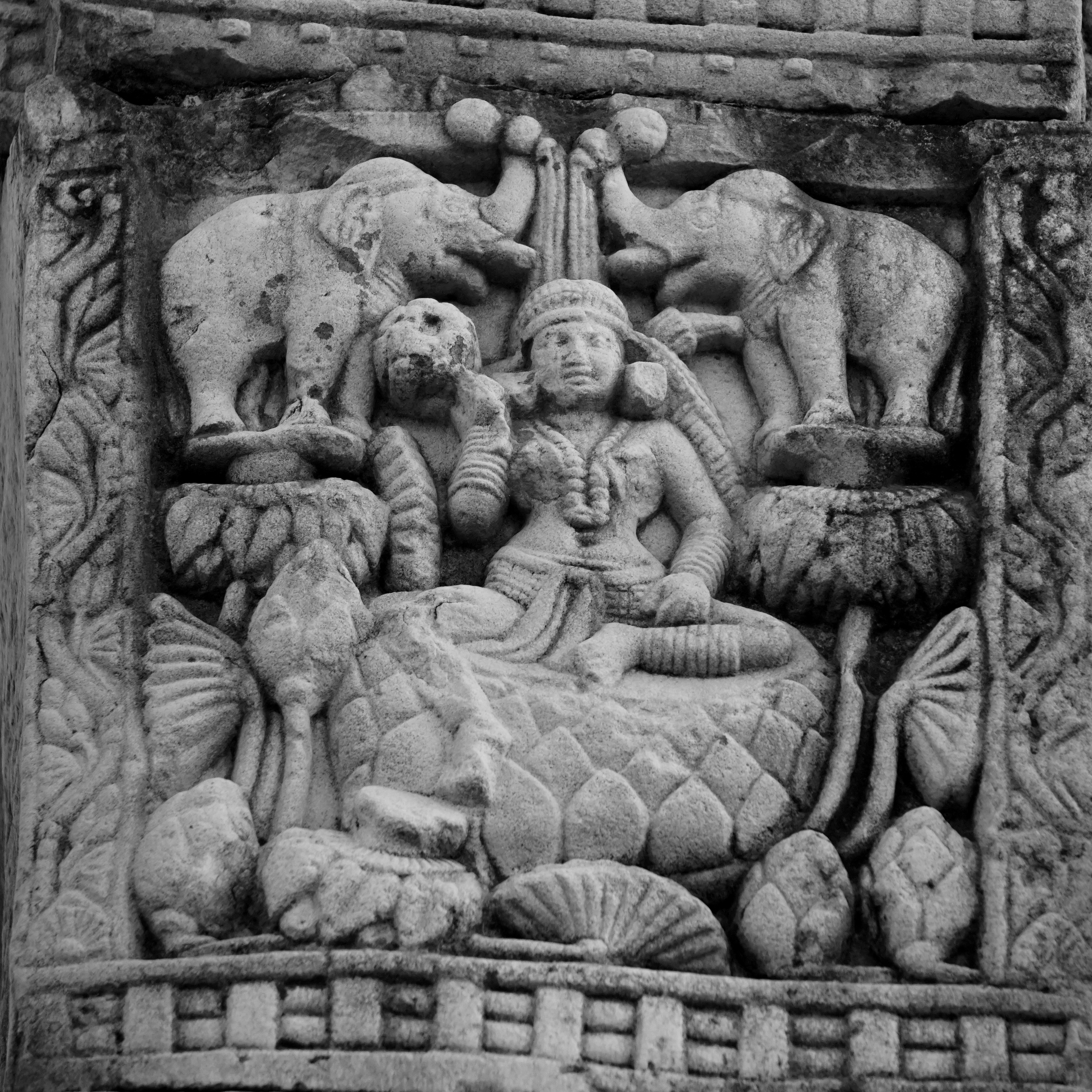
The Buddha's mother, Queen Maya, lustrated by elephants. Sanchi, Stupa 3 gateway, probably 1st century CE

The vast majority of lotus thrones just depict an isolated flower or a group of flowers under different figures. But some images depict more of the plant. A famous relief of GajaLakshmi in Cave 16 at Ellora shows a pond of lotus leaves and budding flowers as a vertical panel below the throne.

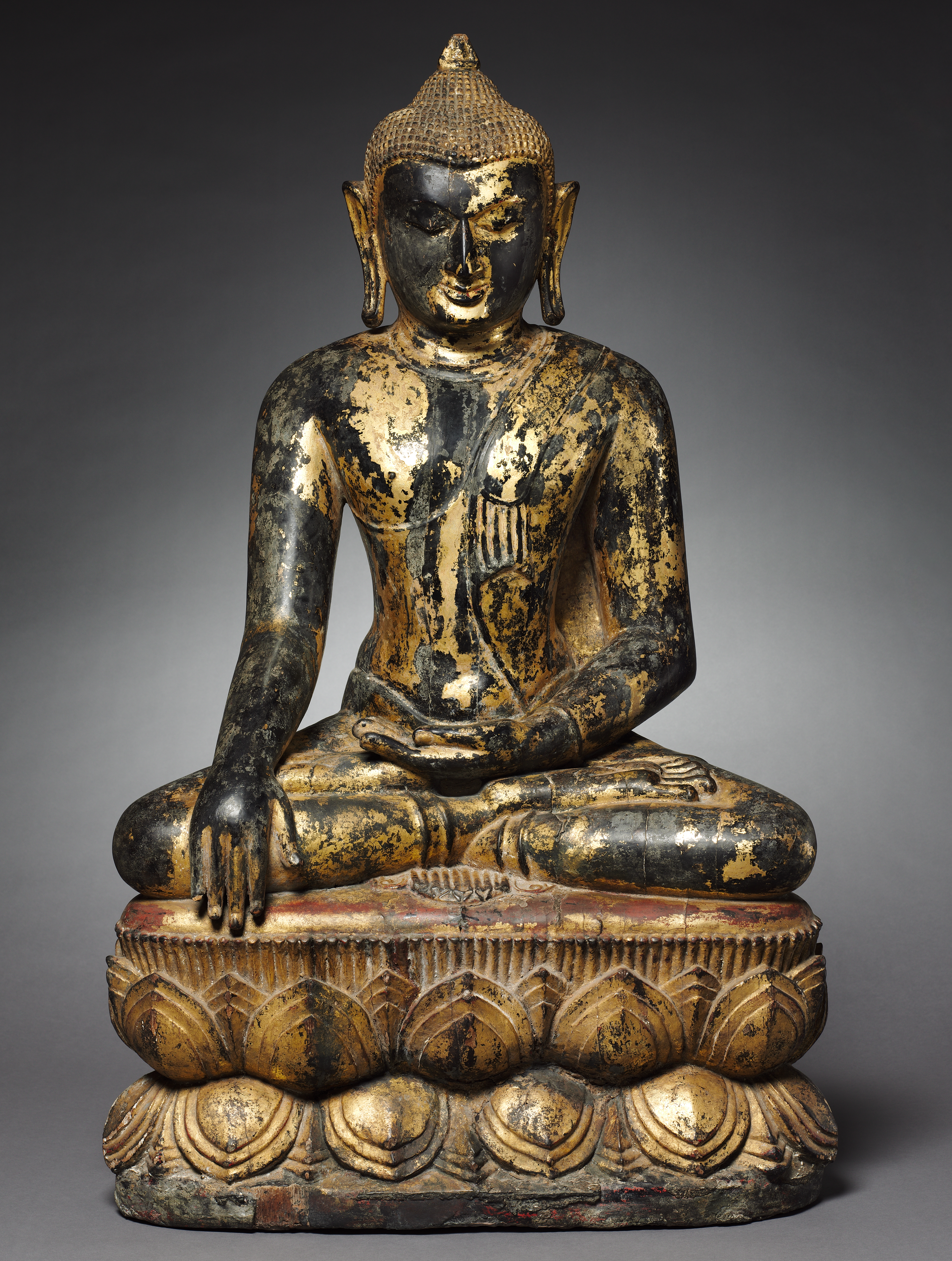
Burmese wood and lacquer Buddha, 11th century

Other compositions show stalks, buds and flowers reaching up beside a main figure. These may terminate in a flower held by the main figure, especially if it is Avalokitesvara or from the 5th or 6th century Vishnu, (both also having the epithet Padmapani, "lotus holder"), or in another lotus throne behind the hand, if it is outstretched in a mudra. Alternatively, stalks may climb up to support lotus thrones underneath minor, smaller, figures, as in the early terracotta plaque illustrated above, where stalks rise at the side to support the elephants lustrating GajaLakshmi. This is seen in the 1st century BCE terracotta plaque illustrated above. The Sanchi stone relief illustrated here shows a similar composition with Queen Maya, mother of the Buddha. Above or below the water, the stems may be supported by small naga figures.

The lotus plant in lotus thrones is often imagined as growing out of the cosmic ocean, and a few images represent the plant below the water level, with a stem also representing the world axis.
