= White lotus =

White lotus can refer to:

== Plants ==
- White waterlily, an aquatic flowering plant
  - Nymphaea alba, of Europe and North Africa
  - Nymphaea ampla, of North America and South America
  - Nymphaea lotus, of East Africa and Southeast Asia
  - Nymphaea nouchali, of South Asia, Southeast Asia and Northern Australia
  - Nymphaea odorata, of North America
  - Nymphaea pubescens, of South Asia and Southeast Asia

== Buddhist sect ==
- White Lotus Societies, Buddhist sects which became an influential secret societies in imperial China
  - Red Turban Rebellion, a 1351–1368 rebellion that overthrew the Yuan dynasty
  - White Lotus Rebellion, a 1794–1804 rebellion during the Qing dynasty

== Other uses ==
- White Lotus (album), a 2011 album by the American post-hardcore band Eyes Set to Kill
- Ganglamedo, also translated as White lotus, a 2006 Chinese musical film
- The White Lotus, an American TV series
- White Lotus, a 1965 novel by John Hersey
- White Lotus Foundation, a yoga organization

== See also ==
- Sacred lotus (disambiguation)
- Blue lotus (disambiguation)
- White waterlily (disambiguation)
- Egyptian water lily (disambiguation)
- The Nightingale and the Rose
