= Blue lotus =

Blue lotus may refer to:

== Lotus plants ==
- Nymphaea nouchali var. caerulea, a water lily in the genus Nymphaea that was known to the Ancient Egyptian civilizations
- Nymphaea nouchali, a water lily of genus Nymphaea that is native to southern and eastern parts of Asia, containing the sedating alkaloids apomorphine and nuciferine

== Arts, entertainment, media ==
- The Blue Lotus, a 1936 book in the Tintin series
- "The Blue Lotus", a 2004 song by My Dying Bride off the album Songs of Darkness, Words of Light
- "Blue Lotus", a 2000 song by Southpacific off the album Constance (album)
- "Blue Lotus", a 2026 song by Tori Amos off the album In Times of Dragons

== Other uses ==
- Blue Lotus, a lotus-infused vodka-based energy drink from lotus vodka
- Xiantiandao, also known as the Blue Lotus Sect, a 17th century cult in East Asia

== See also ==
- Uphoswan (Nepali: Blue Lotus), a 1956 story by Rebati Ramanananda Shrestha
- Blue (disambiguation)
- Lotus (disambiguation)
- Utpala (disambiguation) (Sanskrit: blue lotus blossom)
- Neelathamara (disambiguation) (Malayalam: blue lotus)
- Neel Kamal (disambiguation) (Sanskrit: blue lotus)
- Sacred lotus (disambiguation)
