= Lotus de Païni =

Italian-born painter, writer, sculptor (1862–1953)

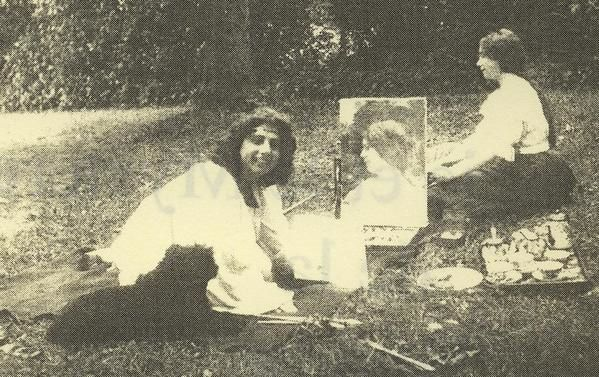
- De Païni painting in the park of the Château de Bosmelet, circa 1900
- Born: Elvezia Giulia Maria Gazzotti; 28 November 1862; Copparo, Emilia-Romagna, Italy
- Died: 22 July 1953; Puy-l'Évêque, France
- Other names: L.E. De Paini, Lotus Péralté, Madame Péralté, Mlle Mame-Helvetia Lotus, Lotus Gazotti
- Occupation(s): Painter, sculptor, writer
- Movement: Orientalism, fin de siècle, Western esotericism, occultism
- Spouse(s): Nicolas de Païni (m. c. 1890–1899; divorced), Paul Péralté (c. 1900–)

Baroness Lotus de Païni (née Elvezia Giulia Maria Gazzotti; 28 November 1862 – 22 July 1953) was an Italian painter, sculptor, writer, and occultist. She also used the names L. E. De Paini, Lotus Gazzotti, and Lotus Péralté.

== Early life, family, and education ==
Lotus de Païni was born on 28 November 1862, in Copparo in Emilia-Romagna, Italy, and raised in Vallauris in Provence-Alpes-Côte d'Azur, France. Her mother Thérèse Guignon was French from Vallauris, and her father Giuseppe Gazzotti was Swiss-born Italian.

She married Baron Nicolas de Païni in c. 1890, and they divorced nine years later. Her second marriage was c. 1900 to Paul Péralté, a surgeon, however the date was complicated by the French courts over her divorce not finalized.

== Career ==
De Païni was a self-taught artist, who liked to make her artwork while traveling. In 1894 she was working in Bucharest, Romania; where she painted the noted, Portrait of Queen Carmen Sylva (Carmen Sylva, the Queen of Romania).

She exhibited at Société Nationale des Beaux-Arts in Paris, in 1897, 1898 and 1899.

Around 1904, De Païni accompanied Paul Péralté on a trip to Ceylon (now Sri Lanka), India and Tibet, which inspired a number of paintings. Followed by a trip years later to Egypt, and Palestine.

After her marriage to Péralté, they were both member of the Theosophical Society. She started following Rudolf Steiner around 1913. Under the name Lotus Péralté, starting from 1914 she published writings on painting and then on Western esotericism. Her writings and artwork were admired by André Breton, Conrad Moricand, and Théophile Briant.

Her artwork is in museum collections, including at the Guimet Museum in Paris.

== Publications ==
- Péralté, Lotus (1909). Réflexions d'une artiste sur les dessins de la caverne d'Altamira [Reflections of an artist on the drawings of the Altamira cave] (in French). Paris: E. Sansot.
- Péralté, Lotus (1914). L'Ésotérisme de Parsifal. L'ésotérisme de la vieille légende celtique du cycle d'Artus. Suivis d'une traduction littérale du Parsifal de Richard Wagner [The Esotericism of Parsifal. The Esotericism of the Old Celtic Legend of the Arthurian Cycle. Followed by a Literal Translation of Richard Wagner's Parsifal] (in French). Paris: Perrin Et Cie.
- Péralté, Lotus (1914). Les Premières phases d'un mouvement de l'esprit [The First Phases of a Movement of the Mind] (in French). Paris: E. Sansol et Cie.
- De Païni, Lotus (1924). Les Trois totémisations, essai sur le sentir visuel des très vieilles races [The Three Totemizations, an essay on the visual sensation of very old races] (in French). Paris: Chacornac.
- De Païni, Lotus (1928). La Magie et le mystère de la femme [The Magic and Mystery of Woman] (in French). Paris: Éditions du Loup.
- De Païni, Lotus (1930). En Palestine, relations de voyage [In Palestine, travel reports] (in French). Paris: Éditions du Loup.
- De Païni, Lotus (1932). Pierre Volonté. Paris: Leymarie.
- De Païni, Lotus (1934). Le Mysticisme intégral [Integral Mysticism] (in French). Paris: Éditions les Argonautes.
